= List of Star Trek: New Voyages episodes =

The following is an episode list for the internet Star Trek fan film series known as Star Trek: New Voyages and Star Trek: Phase II.

== Episodes ==
No.	Title	Directed by	Written by	Length	Original release date	Stardate
0	"Come What May"	Jack Marshall	Jack Marshall	39:45	January 16, 2004	6010.1
After receiving a distress call, USS Enterprise, commanded by Captain James T. Kirk (James Cawley), is assigned to investigate an intruder attacking the Primus IV colony. Once there, the crew encounters a strange alien life form that can produce visions of personal events displaced in time. These visions may hold the key to better understanding the threat they are about to encounter. This pilot episode was a "test of concept" and is not considered one of the official episodes. Guest starring: Eddie Paskey as Admiral Leslie; John Winston as Captain Jefferies; Andrea Ajemian as The Onabi; Larry Nemecek as Cal Strickland
1	"In Harm's Way"	Jack Marshall	Erik Korngold; Max Rem	57:29	October 8, 2004	unknown
The time stream was changed by sending a Doomsday Machine back in time. There, the Doomsday Machine destroyed several planets, manufactured more Doomsday Machines, and began what is now known as the Doomsday Wars. Captain Kirk, in command of USS Farragut, is sent back in time to prevent this from happening and save the future. The Guardian of Forever also appears. The episode also portrays a second Guardian, much larger than the first, through which a starship can fly. This episode is a sequel to both "The City on the Edge of Forever" & "The Doomsday Machine." William Windom reprises his TOS role of Commodore Matthew Decker. Guest starring: William Windom as Matthew Decker; BarBara Luna as Veronica; Malachi Throne as Korogh and Commodore José Mendez (voice); John Carrigan as Kargh; Kurt Carley as Captain Christopher Pike; Becky Bonar as Dr. MacGregor
2	"To Serve All My Days"	Jack Marshall	D. C. Fontana	59:59	November 23, 2006 (special edition) May 1, 2008	6031.2
A group of Klingons are planning to expand their territory, but while the crew is doing everything in their power to stop the invaders, one famous lieutenant has to fight off his own demons when an old disease starts to age him at an alarming pace. Celebrating 40 years of Star Trek, Walter Koenig returns as Pavel Chekov, USS Enterprise's best-known weapons officer. This episode is a sequel to The Deadly Years. Guest starring: Walter Koenig as Pavel Chekov; Mary Linda Rapelye as Ambassador Morgan; John Carrigan as Kargh
3	"World Enough and Time"	Marc Scott Zicree	Marc Scott Zicree; Michael Reaves	64:26	August 23, 2007	6283.4
When a failed Romulan weapons test traps Enterprise in an inter-dimensional rift, Sulu (Lim) and another crewmate are sent over to the wreckage of the Romulan ships. The anomaly's effect on the transporter causes Sulu (George Takei) to come back 30 years older... and with a daughter. "World Enough and Time" was the last episode to be released under the show's original title of Star Trek: New Voyages. Guest starring: George Takei as Hikaru Sulu; Grace Lee Whitney as Janice Rand; Majel Barrett as the Computer Voice; Christina Moses as Alana Sulu; Lia Johnson as Dr. Chandris; Mimi Chong as Demora Sulu
4	"Blood and Fire, Part 1"	David Gerrold	David Gerrold; Carlos Pedraza	43:47	December 20, 2008	6429.2
Originally pitched to Star Trek: The Next Generation, this episode was turned down due to its controversial storyline dealing with homosexuality and AIDS. Original author Gerrold adapted it into a book (ISBN 1932100113), and Carlos Pedraza adapted it for the New Voyages crew. The episode marks the first appearance of Bobby Quinn Rice, formerly of Star Trek: Hidden Frontier. It is the first episode to be released under the show's new title of Star Trek: Phase II. Guest starring: Bobby Quinn Rice as Peter Kirk; Evan Fowler as Alex Freeman; Phil Keoghan as Admiral Keoghan
5	"Blood and Fire, Part 2"	David Gerrold	David Gerrold; Carlos Pedraza	54:54	November 20, 2009	6429.2
Originally pitched to Star Trek: The Next Generation, this episode was turned down due to its controversial storyline dealing with homosexuality and AIDS. Original author Gerrold adapted it into a book (ISBN 1932100113), and Carlos Pedraza adapted it for the New Voyages crew. The episode had guest star Bobby Quinn Rice of Star Trek: Hidden Frontier. Guest starring: Denise Crosby as Dr. Jenna Yar; Bill Blair as Commander Blodgett; Bobby Quinn Rice as Peter Kirk; Evan Fowler as Alex Freeman; John Carrigan as Kargh
6	"Enemy: Starfleet"	Ben Tolpin	Dave Galanter; Patty Wright	58:05	April 22, 2011	7232.5
This episode came from a story by Dave Galanter and Greg Brodeur. It takes place partly on an alien planet, with location shooting and principal photography in New York. Guest starring: BarBara Luna as Alersa; Paul Sieber as Alcar Kyril; Vic Mignogna as an Andorian Captain; Bobby Quinn Rice as Peter Kirk
7	"The Child"	Jon Povill	Jon Povill; Jaron Summers	52:39	April 5, 2012	9717.7
Originally a script for the unproduced TV series, Star Trek: Phase II, in 1977 and later reworked into the first episode of the second season of Star Trek: The Next Generation, albeit with a simplified plot. Now being developed as it was originally written. Guest starring: Anna Schnaitter as Ensign Isel; Ayla Cordell as Irska; Bobby Quinn Rice as Peter Kirk
8	"Kitumba"	Vic Mignogna	Patty Wright; John Meredyth Lucas	65:26	December 31, 2013	2623.3
Originally a two-part story draft for the Star Trek: Phase II TV series in 1977, it was rewritten into a one-part episode for this production. A good deal of the episode takes place on Qo'nos, the Klingon homeworld: which was shot on location at Fort Ticonderoga, New York, and at a local restaurant. Members of the International Klingon Federation helped out with the location shoots. James Cawley makes his final appearance in the series as Captain Kirk. Guest starring: John Carrigan as Kargh; Kario Periera Bailey as Kitumba; Vic Mignogna as Malkthon; Michele Specht as Kali; Pony R. Horton as K'Sia; Gil Gerard as Admiral Sheehan; Andrew Probert as Commodore Probert; Bobby Rice; Bobby Quinn Rice as Peter Kirk
9	"Mind-Sifter"	Mark Edward Lewis	Rick Chambers	63:12	December 1, 2014	unknown
Captain Kirk is missing and presumed dead. The Enterprise continues on with Spock as Captain, but the Klingons have psychically tortured Kirk and sent him into the past, where he is held in an asylum. Based on a legendary fan story by Shirley S. Maiweski. Brian Gross replaces James Cawley as Kirk in this and all following productions. Former Kirk actor James Cawley makes a cameo appearance as an Elvis impersonator who confronts Kirk (now played by Brian Gross), referred to as having "been here for years" and with Kirk declaring, "I hate that guy!"
10	"The Holiest Thing"	Daren R. Dochterman	Rick Chambers	63:58	January 15, 2016	7713.6
The Enterprise investigates the explosion of a Federation research outpost by a mysterious alien race. Meanwhile, Kirk develops a bond with the outpost's lone survivor: Dr. Carol Marcus. Principal began June 9, 2013. This episode was scheduled to be released on February 14, 2014, but was delayed due to a winter storm.

== Unfinished ==
Following CBS/Paramount's new Star Trek fan film guidelines, the final three episodes of New Voyages were left in an unfinished post-production state, as several key members of the production team (including series creator James Cawley) cannot continue work on the series under the guidelines, which forbid previous contributors to official Star Trek projects from working on fan films.

No.	Title	Directed by	Written by	Length	Original release date	Stardate
11	"Bread and Savagery"	Mark Burchett	Rick Chambers	TBA	Production Halted	TBA
A follow-up to TOS season 2 episode "Bread and Circuses".
12	"Origins: The Protracted Man"	David Gerrold	David Gerrold; Dave Galanter	TBA	Production Halted	TBA
An episode that goes back to the beginning and explores James T. Kirk's life as a cadet and shows how his adventures all began. A unfinished but mostly complete version is available online. Guest starring: Colin Cunningham as Captain Christopher Pike
13	"Torment of Destiny"	Mark Edward Lewis	Rick Chambers	TBA	Production Halted	TBA
This episode is a sequel to the original series episode “For the World is Hollow and I Have Touched the Sky”. As of early 2017, Post-Production work had continued for this episode. About 180 visual effects needed to be added to the episode and this was expected to take many months as two of the three visual effects experts can no longer work on the project due to the restrictions of the Fan-Film guidelines. Completion was not expected before late in 2017 and release depended on special permission being given by CBS. Pending approval by CBS. However, as of 2026, only a unfinished version is publicly available. Guest starring: Special guest star Richard Hatch (Captain Apollo from the original Battlestar Galactica) as Orthros (in Hatch's final filmed appearance before his death in 2016).; Rivkah Raven Wood guest stars as Natira, the High Priestess of Yonada; Clay Sayre as President Ro’Kail; Rebecca Larken as To’Rya; Douglas Calvin guest stars, in his debut role, as Commodore Bob Wesley, Captain of the USS Lexington

== Vignettes ==
In addition to the full-length episodes, a series of short, ten-minute-long films called "the vignettes" were filmed with the intention of being released in the months leading up to the release of "To Serve All My Days". The vignettes include:

- "Center Seat" ~ Written by Erik Korngold, Directed by Erik Goodrich and filmed during the production of "To Serve All My Days". This tells the story of Sulu's return from Command Training to rejoin the crew of Enterprise (where DeSalle has been "filling in" for the legendary helmsman). Released on March 17, 2006 (5 minutes 29 seconds "Original Release"; 5 minutes 46 seconds "Full Score Restored")
- "No Win Scenario" ~ Written by Erik Korngold, Directed by Erik Goodrich. Starring John Carrigan, James Cawley, Annie Carrigan and Guest Starring Larry Nemecek and Paul Seiber. Released on October 8, 2011 (9 minutes 5 seconds)
- "Change of Command" ~ Written by Erik Korngold, Directed by Erik Goodrich. Starring Jeff Quinn, Charles Root, James Cawley and Kurt Carley as Capt. Christopher Pike. Never released.
- "Auld Lang Syne" ~ Written by Erik Korngold and intended to be an animated vignette, the story centered on the moment, during New Year's celebrations, when Chekov is promoted. The dialogue was directed and recorded by Erik Goodrich during the filming of "To Serve All My Days". Never released.
- "No Lesson Learned" ~ Written by Erik Korngold. Never released.
- "Untitled Rand/DeSalle Story" ~ Written by Erik Korngold. Never released.

Further Vignettes have been shot and some have been released.

- "Going Boldly" released on August 6, 2012 with incomplete sound mix. (9 minutes 4 seconds)
- "Heroes" to be filmed between October 1 and October 3, 2013
- "Music" to be filmed between October 1 and October 3, 2013

All unreleased "Classic" (pre 2010) vignettes have been shelved, due to the poor quality of the footage compared to the current high-def quality episodes now being released. Re-filming some of the vignettes has been discussed as a possibility.
