= World Enough and Time (Star Trek: New Voyages) =

- Star Trek: New Voyages episode
- Episode no.: Episode 3
- Directed by: Marc Scott Zicree
- Written by: Michael Reaves & Marc Scott Zicree
- Original air date: August 23, 2007
- Running time: 64:26

Guest appearances
- George Takei as Hikaru Sulu; Grace Lee Whitney as Janice Rand; Majel Barrett as the Computer Voice; Christina Moses as Alana Sulu; Lia Johnson as Dr. Chandris; Mimi Chong as Demora Sulu; Mallory Reaves as Ensign Mallory; Steve Perry as Voice of Shuttlecraft Sturgeon Pilot

Episode chronology
← Previous "To Serve All My Days"	Next → "Blood and Fire"

"World Enough and Time" is the third episode of the American science fiction web television series Star Trek: New Voyages. It was released on the internet on August 23, 2007, at the same time as a premiere in Beverly Hills, California. It was written by Michael Reaves and Marc Scott Zicree, and directed by Zicree. Set in the 23rd century, the series follows the adventures of Captain James T. Kirk (James Cawley) and his crew aboard the Starfleet starship USS Enterprise. In this episode, when a failed Romulan weapons test traps Enterprise in an inter-dimensional rift, Lt. Hikaru Sulu (John Lim) and another crewmate are sent over to the wreckage of the Romulan ships. The anomaly's effect on the transporter causes Sulu (George Takei) to come back 30 years older and with a daughter, Alana (Christina Moses).

The plot was based on a Sulu-centric story pitched by Reaves for the 1970s television series Star Trek: Phase II. The idea was reprised when Zicree was introduced to New Voyages by actor Walter Koenig in 2005, and Zicree offered Reaves' story to the production. Once they were interested, Zicree convinced Reaves to team up with him to co-write the actual script, and also gained the agreement of Takei to appear. Moses was hired after a previous actress dropped out. Filming took place over 12 days, split between Ticonderoga, Los Angeles and Orlando. There is a discrepancy in accounts of the production between Zicree and producer Cawley, with the latter saying that Carlos Pedraza completed the direction of the episode uncredited, which was denied by Zicree. The special effects were completed by Ron Thornton, and the graduating class of Jeff Scheetz's Digital Animation and Visual Effects School. Further work was conducted by Daren Dochterman and costume designs by Iain McCaig.

The episode was positively received by critics, who praised the story, production values and effects seen as well as the performances of Takei and Moses. "World Enough and Time" was nominated for multiple awards, both specific for web-based productions and more generally against professional television episodes. These included the Hugo Award for Best Dramatic Presentation and the Nebula Award for Best Script. The Nebula Award nomination caused controversy in particular due to criticism over the inclusion of an amateur production in a category for professional productions. The only award won was the 2007 TV Guide Online Video Award for Best Sci-Fi Webisode.

== Plot ==
On the bridge of the USS Excelsior, Captain Hikaru Sulu (George Takei) reminiscences as the shuttlecraft Sturgeon approaches the ship. He recalls a mission on the USS Enterprise that took them into the Romulan neutral zone to save a drifting freighter. Three Imperator-class Romulan warbirds de-cloak and destroy the freighter, in response the Enterprise fires on the Romulans, destroying them but creating a spatial anomaly in the process which will destroy the ship in a matter of hours. Lt. Sulu (John Lim) and Dr. Lisa Chandris (Lia Johnson) are sent on a shuttlecraft to the Romulan wreckage to gain the information required to allow the Enterprise computer to plot a means to escape the rift. They retrieve the information, but cannot return to the shuttlecraft after the warbird is damaged further by gravity waves from the anomaly. As they are being transported back to the Enterprise, the warbird explodes and Lt. Commander Montgomery "Scotty" Scott (Charles Root) loses their signal.

He finds a different signal for Sulu, but when he appears on the transporter pad, he is visibly older (Takei) and dressed as a barbarian. Sulu attacks the crew with a sword, but is disabled by Commander Spock (Jeffery Quinn) using a Vulcan nerve pinch. Sulu explains that to him 30 years have passed, with Chandris dying 15 years prior on a planet they named Caliban. Scotty manages to get a lock on another signal, but cannot re-materialize it without additional equipment. As Sulu explains that he cannot remember the information needed to release the Enterprise, Scotty manages to partly materialize Sulu's daughter Alana (Christina Moses) within a science lab but she remains trapped between universes. Attempting to retrieve the Romulan information, Spock attempts to mind meld with Sulu but the traumatic memories of the death of Chandris nearly kills them both. Spock is subsequently ordered to find a different means to exit the anomaly. As McCoy attempts to aid Sulu's memories with drugs, Kirk and Alana flirt with each other. Following further scans by Spock, they realise that she is tied to the anomaly and may return to the other universe once the Enterprise exits. Kirk initiates Spock's backup plan to implode the rift, but it damages the ship and knocks Alana unconscious.

With only 30 minutes remaining before the ship is destroyed, Kirk considers transporting the entire crew to Caliban so they can survive. Scotty discovers Sulu's original transporter pattern, from when the warbird was destroyed. He theorizes that he could re-integrate it into the older version, resetting his memories so that he could remember the Romulan information and allowing him to pilot the Enterprise to safety but causing him to forget his 30 years on Caliban. Alana reassures him that she'll remind him of the man he became, but McCoy and Spock agree that leaving the rift will cause the death of Alana. Sulu draws his sword and is prepared to fight to save his daughter, but she talks him down. He strides onto the transporter pad and demands they reintegrate his pattern. As he is merged once again, Alana quotes The Tempest. The younger version of Sulu is taken to the bridge and pilots the Enterprise from the anomaly with seconds to spare, with Alana ceasing to exist as he does so. Spock and Kirk then tell Sulu about what happened, and Spock is able to mind meld Sulu's memories from their previous mind meld back into Sulu.

On the Excelsior, Captain Sulu meets with the shuttle passengers in his ready room; his daughter Demora (Mimi Chong) and is introduced to his baby granddaughter, Alana. As the episode ends, he tells Demora, "...you had a sister."

== Production ==
=== Writing and casting ===
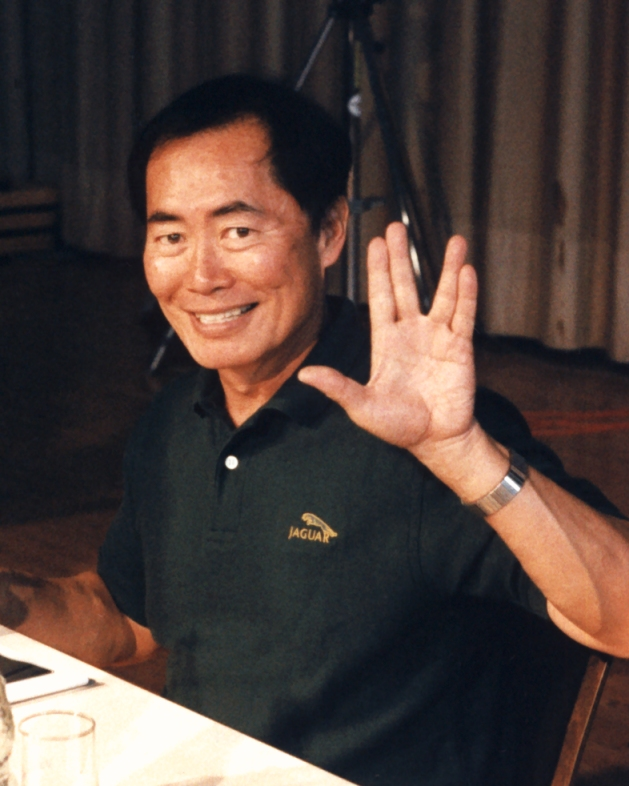
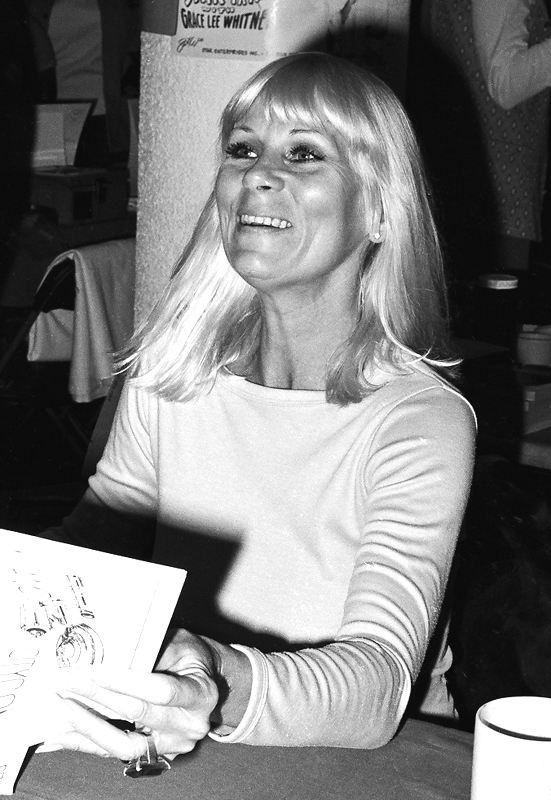
George Takei (pictured in 1996) and Grace Lee Whitney (pictured in 1980) both returned to Star Trek for "World Enough and Time".

The plot of the episode has origins in the 1970s. Marc Scott Zicree was attending a Clarion Science Fiction Writer's Workshop, and afterwards completed his undergraduate degree at the University of California, Los Angeles (UCLA). While there, he saw that a class was being conducted by Theodore Sturgeon; Zicree snuck in since undergraduates were not allowed to attend. This resulted in Zicree meeting Michael Reaves, who was acting as the teacher's assistant for the lecture; the two became close friends. Around the same time, Reaves pitched a Sulu-based story for Star Trek: Phase II, but after the series went unproduced, the plot was never completed. The two maintained a friendship over following decades, as both launched LA-based writing careers around the same time, working extensively in animation and science fiction, sometimes on the same shows. Amongst many other credits, Reaves wrote the Star Trek: The Next Generation episode "Where No One Has Gone Before" with Diane Duane. (Reaves also pitched a version of this story—without Sulu—to the producers of Next Generation, but it was passed on.) Zicree, meanwhile, amongst his many credits, received a "story by" credit on one episode of Star Trek: The Next Generation ("First Contact") and a similar "story by" credit one episode of Star Trek: Deep Space Nine ("Far Beyond the Stars").

The TV-writing careers of both Zicree and Reaves wound down around 2002/2003. In 2005, Zicree was introduced to Star Trek: New Voyages by Walter Koenig when they were both on a Star Trek panel at a science fiction convention held at UCLA. Koenig was about to travel to film the episode "To Serve All My Days".

Zicree recalled Reaves' Sulu story and contacted New Voyages to offer it. He received a form response turning him down. Undeterred, he got in touch with John Muenchrath, who is both a producer on the series and portrayed Doctor Leonard McCoy. He was interested and this resulted in further conversations with executive producer James Cawley. After it was confirmed that New Voyages wanted the story, Zicree contacted Reaves, who agreed to co-write the episode with him. A synopsis of the plot was prepared for Zicree to show to George Takei. Takei had previously portrayed Sulu in Star Trek: The Original Series and the associated films. His most recent Star Trek appearance, along with Whitney, was in the Star Trek: Voyager episode "Flashback". Based on the proposal for "World Enough and Time", Takei agreed to appear. Takei explained that the plot of "World Enough and Time" gave Sulu a "whole different life experience" which he saw as being "in keeping with the kind of global or intergalactic lives that the people of the Enterprise lived".

Zicree invested $60,000 in the production, which included the hiring of an editor. The completed script was shown to Cawley, who offered the directing position to Zicree. (Reaves, who had Parkinson's disease, was not further involved in the production after the script was completed, although his daughter, Mallory Reaves, was cast in a small role as an ensign serving under Sulu.) Zicree accepted the position, and sought to imitate the production of a television episode by filming in high-definition. During the course of the production, Zicree received advice on directing from J. J. Abrams. In addition to Takei, Grace Lee Whitney appeared as Janice Rand. She too had played the character in The Original Series, and had most recently appeared with Takei in "Flashback". Majel Barrett Roddenberry, widow of series creator Gene Roddenberry, had regular recurring roles across several Star Trek series, including as the voice of most Starfleet computer interfaces; she agreed to voice the computer interface in this production as well. Christina Moses, who portrayed Alana Sulu, was a replacement for an actress who dropped out of the production some four weeks prior to production. The producers held further auditions in California, and Zicree said that "The moment we saw her, she was perfect".

=== Filming and special effects ===
The shoot took 12 days to film, in three different locations around the United States in 2006. A great number of cast and crew worked on the series, with 235 appearing in the credits, plus a further 50 in the special thanks section. Zicree estimated at the time that this number may have been closer to 300, and that around 95% of these worked for free. Cawley later denied that there were 300 people working on the episode, and added that the only people who were paid for it were Zicree and Takei, as well as the editor Zicree hired at his own expense. Nine days were spent on the Enterprise sets in Ticonderoga, New York, two days in Los Angeles on the set for the Excelsior and then finally one day on the Universal soundstages in Orlando, Florida on the Romulan sets.

Zicree explained that he did not consider "World Enough and Time" to be a fan-film, comparing it to the episodes of Sliders he was a producer on. He said that they sought to do it the same way as a network show, but added that "the level of production is way beyond what any network show would be, because you would never have 700 visual effects shots in a single hour on any network show." However, Cawley said that Zicree treated many of the New Voyages crew poorly, and he was removed from the set after they faced a staff walkout. There were further difficulties in production as Zicree also hired a professional assistant director, but this crewmember walked off set during a night shoot early in the production and did not return. Cawley explained that after he spoke to Zicree, the director had a "meltdown" and was unable to complete the shoot; Cawley brought his friend Carlos Pedraza aboard to complete the episode. Pedreza, who is credited on the finished production as co-executive producer and script supervisor, recalls that "The ‘professional’ first assistant director refused to take the advice from our volunteer who had AD’d before, so it was no surprise we got further and further behind schedule by the time Marc had his breakdown, and some of the L.A. people wilted under the pressure.” Pedraza shot 14 pages of script in one day in order to bring the film in on time.

Zicree, while not denying the on-set friction, has said, "No other director worked on [it] at any stage, there's not a frame of it that was shot or edited by anyone else." Cawley later said "Marc is all about using this production to further his own career, a stark difference between his goal and all the others who were there doing it. Did we aspire to be a pro-looking production? Yup. And we were and are proud of it. Did we take salaries and/or compensation? Nope. That was a tough episode to shoot for many reasons."

The special effects on the episode were overseen by Ron Thornton, who had previously worked on the first season of Star Trek: Enterprise as well as the opening shot of the film Star Trek: Nemesis and the updated graphics for the Director's Cut of Star Trek: The Motion Picture. Thornton had first heard about New Voyages through his former colleague Doug Drexler, and started work on the episode after Jeff Scheetz discussed the project with him. The script required the creation of new ships through Computer-generated imagery, these included a new Romulan warbird as well as a Federation freighter. Thornton had previously developed the CGI ships on Babylon 5.

The effects were created by a team of 15, along with five volunteers. This was part of graduation project for the class at Scheetz's Digital Animation and Visual Effects School. LightWave 3D was primarily used for the effects shots, with Blackmagic Fusion used for composition. A new opening credits sequence was created for "World Enough and Time" by Daren Dochterman, who also took the lead on the special effects for the subsequent episode, "Blood and Fire". The outfits for Alana Sulu and Takei's older version of Hikaru Sulu were designed by Iain McCaig and his daughter Christina. McCaig had previously worked on the Star Wars franchise among other projects, where he created the looks of Darth Maul and Padmé Amidala for Star Wars: Episode I – The Phantom Menace.

== Reception ==
"World Enough and Time" premiered at the Fine Arts Theater in Beverly Hills, California on August 23, 2007. Between 400 and 600 fans attended, with around half turned away once the screen was filled. Several former Star Trek actors and crew attended the premiere, including Takei, Koenig, David Gerrold, D.C. Fontana, George Clayton Johnson and Ronald B. Moore as well as the son of Gene Roddenberry, Rod Roddenberry. The intention was to live broadcast the episode on the internet, but after this failed due to the level of the fan response, over 40,000 viewers attempted to watch "World Enough and Time" on MagicTimeOnline.com. This resulted in a similar result, with some fans able to watch the episode slowly while others decided to wait for episode to download overnight before viewing. It was subsequently released on DVD for contributors towards a Kickstarter campaign in 2015 to fund later episodes of New Voyages.

Takei truly gets a chance to show his range and give the viewers an in depth look at his character. Takei has a number of both quiet and compelling scenes with most of the major stars of the series and seems to help them raise their game. When the episode gets close to the end and Takei is faced with his "City on the Edge of Forever" moment and the veteran actor leaves no dry eye in the house.

— Antony Pascale, August 22, 2007

Steve Weintraub, while writing for Collider, described "World Enough and Time" as "nothing short of amazing". He added that the "level of quality from the special effects to the script is amazing for a fan made show, and the show manages to capture what made the original 'Star Trek' great." Anthony Pascale, in his review for TrekMovie.com, said that the production design in the episode was the best yet for New Voyages. He credited this to the direction and improvements in the lighting, as well as the improved special effects. Pascale said that the guest appearances of Moses and Takei "fits in the fine tradition of memorable Trek guest characters", saying that the "alluring" Moses played Alana with a "subtle charm". Overall, he said that "fans of fan films and Star Trek: New Voyages are sure to be pleased. But for those like myself who have not really bothered with fan films should really give this one a chance."

Michelle Erica Green, who watched "World Enough and Time" for TrekNation, said that it "raised the bar not only for fan productions but for future professional productions of Star Trek". She said that the story reminded her of episodes such as "The City on the Edge of Forever", "The Inner Light" and "Flashback", while Green suggested that the special effects were better than anything seen on The Original Series and were equal to those from Enterprise. However, she found some of the recasting difficult since the actors were portraying the characters the way that they appeared in The Original Series. When listing the best Star Trek fan productions in The Wall Street Journal, Paul Vigna named "World Enough and Time" as the best. He said that it was "a surprisingly well-written and acted episode, and of all the fan films is the one that comes closest in quality to a 'real' episode." Writer/director Joss Whedon described "World Enough and Time" as "probably the best episode of the original Star Trek I'd ever seen", and convinced Whedon that online series were viable.

=== Awards and nominations ===
The episode was nominated for the Hugo Award for Best Dramatic Presentation; it was the only fanmade production in the category. Others nominated in the category included the episodes "Human Nature"/"Family of Blood" of Doctor Who, "Razor" of Battlestar Galactica and "Captain Jack Harkness" of Torchwood. The award went to the Doctor Who episode "Blink". "World Enough and Time" was nominated for the 2008 SyFy Portal Award for Best Web Production. It competed against other productions including further Star Trek fan films such as "Illiad", an episode of Star Trek: Odyssey, but the award went to the film length Star Trek: Of Gods and Men.

Zicree and Reaves were also nominated for a Nebula Award for Best Script; other entries in the category included the script for "Blink", as well as the films Children of Men, The Prestige and V for Vendetta but it was awarded to Guillermo del Toro for Pan's Labyrinth. "World Enough and Time" won the 2007 TV Guide Online Video Award for Best Sci-Fi Webisode, in a field which included Battlestar Galactica: The Resistance.

=== Controversy ===
Following the nomination of "World Enough and Time" at the Nebula Awards, there was criticism of the inclusion of a fan production. Keith DeCandido, writer of Star Trek tie-in novels, wrote on his blog "Look, this isn't a knock on the fan films as such. But that's what they are – they're fan films. They are not professionally produced. What's more, they're unauthorized and, by the letter of the law, illegal. In fact, one of the reasons why they're not prosecuted, is because they don't turn a profit, which is one of the legion of ways that they're not professionally produced". In response, Zicree replied with a statement to the Science Fiction and Fantasy Writers of America, explaining that the episode was produced with the full knowledge of Paramount Pictures and CBS. He explained the involvement of Abrams, and the use of the Universal lot for filming as well as commenting on the crewmembers who were paid at industry standard rates. (Cawley, meanwhile, avers that only Takei and Zicree were paid by the production, and that Zicree paid an editor out of his own pocket.) Zicree also claims that executives at CBS Video wanted to license "World Enough and Time" and include it on a Star Trek Blu-ray but they could not convince their chief executive.
