= Before Dishonor =

Before Dishonor may refer to:

- a song by Hatebreed on the album Satisfaction Is the Death of Desire
- a 2007 novel by Peter David, sequel to Vendetta (Star Trek)
