= John Winston =

John Winston may refer to:

- John A. Winston (1812–1871), Governor of Alabama
- John Winston (actor) (1927–2019), English actor
