= Jon Povill =

American screenwriter

- Born: August 29, 1946 (age 78)
- Occupations: Scriptwriter; television producer

Jon Povill (born August 29, 1946) is an American scriptwriter and television producer. He wrote the first two drafts of the screenplay for Total Recall in the 1970s, and then took up a position on the attempted Star Trek: Phase II, becoming story editor, and penning the episode "The Child", which would later be remade as a Star Trek: The Next Generation episode. He was ultimately credited as associate producer on Star Trek: The Motion Picture.

He worked as a script consultant and producer on Sliders (writing the episodes "Luck of the Draw", "El Sid" and "Obsession") and penned an episode of The Outer Limits in 1998.

== Filmography ==
Year	Title	Credited as	Notes
Film
1979	Star Trek: The Motion Picture	Associate producer	
1990	Total Recall	Story	
2012	Total Recall	Story	
2017	Fatal Rhapsody	Script consultant	Short film
TBA	Meridiem	Supervising writer Consulting producer	
Television and web
1981	A Step in Time	Screenwriter	TV Movie
1988	Star Trek: The Next Generation	Screenwriter in episode 'The Child'	
1995-1996	Sliders	Screenwriter in 3 episodes Executive script consultant in 8 episodes Producer in 13 episodes	
1998	The Outer Limits	Story in episode 'In the Zone'	
1999	Total Recall 2070	Source material in 22 episodes	
2012	Star Trek: New Voyages	Director and screenwriter in episode 'The Child'	Fan-series
2014	The Nature of Things	Story editor in episode 'How to Be a Wild Elephant'	Documentary series
2015	Diabolical Women	Producer in 3 episodes	
