= The Doomsday Machine (Star Trek: The Original Series) =

- Star Trek: The Original Series episode
- The USS Constellation enters the Doomsday Machine.
- Episode no.: Season 2 Episode 6
- Directed by: Marc Daniels
- Written by: Norman Spinrad
- Cinematography by: Jerry Finnerman
- Production code: 035
- Original air date: October 20, 1967

Guest appearances
- William Windom – Commodore Matt Decker; Elizabeth Rogers – Lt. Palmer; John Copage – Elliot; Eddie Paskey – Lt. Leslie; William Blackburn – Lt. Hadley; Richard Compton – Washburn; Tim Burns – Russ; Jerry Catron – Montgomery; John Winston – Lt. Kyle

Episode chronology
← Previous "The Apple"	Next → "Catspaw"
- Star Trek: The Original Series season 2

"The Doomsday Machine" is the sixth episode of the second season of the American science-fiction television series Star Trek. Written by Norman Spinrad and directed by Marc Daniels, it was first broadcast on October 20, 1967.

In the episode, the starship Enterprise fights a powerful, planet-killing machine from another galaxy.

== Plot ==
The USS Enterprise, following a trail of mysteriously destroyed star systems, picks up the automated distress beacon of one of Enterprise's sister ships, the USS Constellation. Upon arrival, the Constellation is found heavily damaged and drifting in space; Captain Kirk, Chief Medical Officer Dr. McCoy, Chief Engineer Scott, and a damage-control team transport to the ship to evaluate her. Once there, they discover the only member of the crew still aboard is the ship's commander, Commodore Matt Decker, who is nearly catatonic and suffering from severe mental shock.

After McCoy injects him with a stimulant, Decker explains that his crew and he had discovered a giant machine, miles long, that used beams of antiprotons to tear planets apart, consuming the rubble for fuel. The attack by Constellation on the machine was ineffective, and the ship suffered heavy damage. Decker evacuated his crew to a nearby planet, remaining aboard the Constellation until last; however, the machine subsequently destroyed the ship's transporter, and then the planet, killing the entire crew. Kirk theorizes that the machine is an ancient doomsday machine, which must be stopped before it reaches more populated sectors of the galaxy. McCoy and Decker transport to Enterprise, which has taken Constellation in tow, while Scott's damage-control team attempts repairs on Constellation's damaged impulse engines, weapons, and shields. Kirk attends to Constellation's nonfunctional viewscreen, which aside from communications from Enterprise, will be his only means of monitoring events outside the ship.

Enterprise's first officer, Spock, informs Kirk of the sudden appearance of the planet killer, which begins to pursue Enterprise. As Kirk's boarding party prepares to beam back aboard, the machine attacks Enterprise, damaging the transporter and disrupting communications. Decker, now the senior officer on board Enterprise, assumes command and orders a phaser attack on the machine; this fails, as the machine's hull is of solid neutronium. Despite Spock's objections, Decker refuses to retreat, and the planet killer captures the Enterprise in a tractor beam, drawing it into its maw.

Completing his repair of Constellation's viewscreen, Kirk is shocked to see Enterprise engaging the planet killer. Scott has managed to repair Constellation's impulse engines and one of her phaser banks, so Kirk uses the crippled ship to approach and fire at the planet killer, distracting it long enough for Enterprise to escape its tractor beam. After repairing the transporter and re-establishing voice communications, Enterprise retreats to a safe distance. Spock relieves Decker of command on Kirk's authority, and Decker is escorted to sickbay. However, Decker overpowers his security escort and steals a shuttlecraft. Overcome with survivor guilt over the loss of his crew, Decker informs Spock he is flying the shuttlecraft straight into the maw of the machine. Kirk begs Decker to return to Enterprise, but Decker does not deviate from his course and flies into the machine, where he dies.

Lt. Sulu reports that the shuttlecraft explosion has reduced the planet killer's power output by a small amount. Realizing that this may have been Decker's intention, and hoping that a starship would do much more damage, Kirk comes up with a plan to explode Constellation inside the planet killer. Over Spock's objections, Kirk insists on piloting the damaged starship in person, and Scott rigs the impulse engines to explode with a 30-second delay before detonation, warning his captain that once the timer is enabled, no way remains to abort it.

With the rest of the boarding party transported back to Enterprise, Kirk aims Constellation at the maw of the planet killer, triggers the timer, and orders Enterprise to beam him aboard. The transporter malfunctions, and Scott races to set it right with advice from Spock. With virtually no time to spare, Kirk is safely beamed aboard Enterprise as Constellation explodes inside the planet killer, destroying the machine's power system and leaving it permanently dead in space. As the Enterprise departs, Kirk and Spock speculate that other doomsday machines could be out there.

== Production ==
Episode writer Norman Spinrad based the script on a novelette "The Planet Eater" that had been rejected by a number of publishers. He revived the idea when he had a chance to pitch it to executive producer Gene Roddenberry. "I did 'The Doomsday Machine' fast," he recalled. Spinrad had written the script with actor Robert Ryan in mind to play Commodore Decker, but Ryan was unavailable, owing to prior commitments.

Some sources hold that the episode was influenced by Fred Saberhagen's Berserker series, which features robotic killing machines built as a doomsday device by a now-vanished race to wipe out their rivals. Author Norman Spinrad, though, denies the influence: "I wasn't conscious of the Saberhagen stuff when I was doing this, but I was certainly conscious of Moby-Dick. And, actually, my unpublished novelette, which was the genesis of "The Doomsday Machine", was written before the Saberhagen stuff." Non-canonical Star Trek media refer to the device as a Berserker.

According to one source, the model for the USS Constellation was an off-the-shelf AMT Enterprise model painted and torched in places for the battle damage, while other sources claim that the smallest and least-detailed Enterprise professional model was altered for the episode. The Constellation's hull ID number of 1017 also was said to come from simply switching the digits of an Enterprise model's 1701 hull numbers.

The episode was written as a bottle episode, i.e., one that could use existing ship sets to save time and money. According to Spinrad, the episode was so well-received by Roddenberry that he commissioned him to write another for comedian Milton Berle, who planned to do a dramatic turn on the show titled "He Walked Among Us".

== Music ==
"The Doomsday Machine" features a complete original score by Sol Kaplan. Writer James Lileks noted that the music cues for this episode are "intended to belong together, and that's one of the reasons the episode works like few others; it has a unique symphonic score. Played start to finish, it holds together." Jeff Bond noted, "Although he wrote only two scores for the series, New York composer Sol Kaplan's music was tracked endlessly throughout the show's first two seasons." Both Lileks and Bond point out similarities between this music and John Williams' award-winning score for Jaws, nearly a decade later. The music for this episode was collected, along with the score for "Amok Time", on the second release from Crescendo Records of music from the series, the first release other than the music from the pilot episodes.

== Noncanonical sequels to the episode ==
An advanced version of the Planet Killer appears in the 1991 Star Trek: The Next Generation novel Vendetta. The novel depicts the original Planet Killer as a prototype for a weapon designed to combat the Borg, released in desperation when the weapon's designers realized that the Borg would defeat them before they could finish the more advanced version. In the 2005 episode of Star Trek: New Voyages, "In Harm's Way", William Windom reprises his role as Commodore Matt Decker almost 40 years later. Star Trek Online features the machine in the Federation storyline.

== Reception ==
This episode was nominated for a Hugo award in 1967. In 1991's 25th-anniversary of the series, a fan survey of the top 10 episodes of the original series ranked "The Doomsday Machine" at number four, behind only "The Trouble with Tribbles", "The City on the Edge of Forever", and "Amok Time."

For the franchise's 30th anniversary, TV Guide ranked "The Doomsday Machine" at number four on its list of the 10 best Star Trek episodes. Zack Handlen of The A.V. Club gave the episode an "A" rating, describing the episode as "very strong stuff", noting effective tension building and the development of Decker's character. Handlen also noted Sol Kaplan's score, which "matches the actors' intensity."

In 2010, SciFiNow ranked this the 10th-best episode of the original series. In 2012, Christian Science Monitor ranked this the 10th-best episode of the original Star Trek. In 2014, Gizmodo ranked "The Doomsday Machine" as the 18th-best episode of Star Trek, out of the over 700 ones made by that time, including later series.

In 2015, WhatCulture ranked this the sixth-best episode of all time in the Star Trek science-fiction universe. In 2015, Wired did not recommend skipping this episode in their binge-watching guide for the original series.

In 2016, The Hollywood Reporter rated "The Doomsday Machine" the 48th-best television episode of all Star Trek franchise television prior to Star Trek: Discovery, including live-action and the animated series, but not counting the movies. Business Insider ranked "The Doomsday Machine" the 13th best episode of the original series. Empire ranked this the 9th best out of the top 50 episodes of all the 700 plus Star Trek television episodes. SyFy ranked guest star William Windom's performance as the self-sacrificing Commodore Matt Decker, as the fourth-best guest star on the original series. CNET noted the Doomsday Machine spacecraft as one of the powerful and important spacecraft of the Star Trek franchise. Newsweek ranked "The Doomsday Machine" as one of the best episodes of the original series. Empire ranked "The Doomsday Machine" 9th out of the 50 top episodes of all Star Trek in 2016. Also in 2016, The Washington Post ranked "The Doomsday Machine" the seventh-best episode of all the franchise television episodes, remarking it was "good fun" with a "thrilling climax".

At that time, roughly 726 episodes and a dozen films had been released. TVLine ranked the episode as having one of the top-20 moments of Star Trek, noting Kirk's line, "Gentlemen, I suggest you beam me aboard...," for the Enterprise to transport him off the Constellation, which is about to self-destruct.

In 2018, Collider ranked this episode the 11th-best original series episode. PopMatters ranked this the 20th-best episode of the original series. They noted it as a "suspenseful episode" and praised the musical score by composer Sol Kaplan. A 2018 Star Trek binge-watching guide, by Den of Geek, recommended this episode as one of the best of the original series.

In 2019, the Edmonton Journal ranked this as having one of the top 10 Spock character moments, pointing out his intervention in Decker's plan to destroy the ship and ensuing conversation.

In 2021, Screen Rant ranked it as the sixth-best episode of the original Star Trek series to rewatch.

In 2024, Hollywood.com ranked "The Doomsday Machine" at number 9 out of the 79 original series episodes.
