= Star Trek: Of Gods and Men =

2008 miniseries by Tim Russ

- A promotional poster for Of Gods and Men
- Directed by: Tim Russ
- Screenplay by: Ethan H. Calk; Sky Conway; Jack Treviño
- Story by: Sky Conway; Tim Russ; Jack Treviño; Ethan H. Calk
- Produced by: Sky Conway
- Starring: Nichelle Nichols; Walter Koenig; Grace Lee Whitney; Alan Ruck; Chase Masterson; Tim Russ; Garrett Wang; Ethan Phillips; J. G. Hertzler; Cirroc Lofton; Gary Graham
- Cinematography: Douglas Knapp
- Music by: Justin R. Durban
- Release date: June 15, 2008 (part 3)
- Running time: 89 minutes
- Language: English

Star Trek: Of Gods and Men is a noncanonical and unofficial Star Trek fan film, which contains many cast members from the Star Trek TV series and movies. Its backstory is "Charlie X", the second episode of Star Trek: The Original Series. Described by the producers as a "40th-anniversary gift" from Star Trek actors to their fans, it was filmed in 2006, but its release was delayed until 2007–08. It was not endorsed by the rights-holders of Star Trek, but has been covered on the official Star Trek website.

== Plot ==
Receiving a distress call Captain Nyota Uhura, Captain Kirk's nephew, Peter, Captain Pavel Chekov and USS Enterprise-B captain John Harriman land on the Guardian of Forever's planet, where Charlie Evans uses the Guardian to erase Kirk from history, changing the timeline drastically where the galaxy becomes a militaristic state headed by "Curate Prime" and Harriman is the mass murderer commander of the G.S.S. Conqueror who captures Chekov (under the nom de guerre "Kittrick") and his companion, the shape-shifter resistance leader, Ragnar.

On Vulcan, Uhura is married to Stonn and has several children. Upon learning of the Conqueror's arrival, the Vulcans begin to evacuate. Harriman destroys the planet.

Uhura and her friend Tuvok are captured by the Conqueror and put in the brig with Kittrick and Ragnar. With Tuvok's help, Uhura recovers memories of the old timeline, and convinces Kittrick and Ragnar to help them take the ship back to the Guardian to restore the timeline. Harriman is taken prisoner and transported to the surface with Kittrick and Uhura, where they encounter Charlie Evans who realized it was a mistake to remove Kirk from the timeline. He restores the three's memories while keeping the memories of the altered timeline as well.

Back on the ship Koval, the Conqueror's Klingon first officer, orders their executions, believing Harriman to have turned traitor. As Commander Garan and his security officers take them to Curate Prime one of them shoots his comrade, revealing himself to be Ragnar.

Uhura recognizes Curate Prime as Gary Mitchell who believes himself to be a living god. With Kirk not there to stop him in this timeline, Mitchell was able to kill the captain of the Enterprise – in this case, Christopher Pike – and take control of the United Federation of Planets, refounding it as the Galactic Order.

While Chekov and Harriman manage to take control of the Conqueror, Uhura transports to the surface. Mitchell follows and then tortures her, demanding Chekov/Kittrick's location. Charlie Evans steps in to protect her. Beaten, Mitchell transports Janice Rand to distract Evans, letting off one last burst of energy before escaping to his flagship. Angered and weakened, Mitchell orders the firing of his ship's Omega device, which will destroy both the captured Conqueror and the planet.

After the Conqueror suffers a warp-core breach Chekov separates the saucer. When the engineering section explodes, the shockwave sends the saucer right into Mitchell's ship. At the same time, as Uhura convinced him to set things right, Evans goes through the Guardian reverting the timeline back to normal.

One year later, Uhura – motivated by her memories of the alternate timeline – marries Stonn on Vulcan. Chekov is at last promoted to admiral, while Harriman announces his intention to run for the Federation Council.

== Cast ==
- Walter Koenig as Captain Pavel Chekov / Kittrick
- Nichelle Nichols as Captain Nyota Uhura
- Alan Ruck as Captain John Harriman
- Garrett Wang as Commander Garan
- William Wellman Jr. as Charlie Evans
- J. G. Hertzler as Koval, a Klingon
- Gary Graham as Ragnar
- Tim Russ as Tuvok
- Chase Masterson as Xela, an Orion
- Daamen Krall as Gary Mitchell
- Crystal Allen as Conqueror Navigator Yara
- Ethan Phillips as Data Clerk
- Cirroc Lofton as Sevar, a Vulcan
- Lawrence Montaigne as Stonn
- James Cawley as Commander Peter Kirk (James T. Kirk's nephew)
- John Carrigan as Klingon Officer Kel'mag / G.S.S. Conqueror Klingon Officer
- Grace Lee Whitney as Janice Rand
- Herbert Jefferson as Captain Galt
- Jeff Quinn as Conqueror Helmsman, a Romulan
- Arlene Martel as Vulcan Priestess
- Jack Donner as Wedding guest
- Tania Lemani as Wedding guest
- Celeste Yarnall as Wedding guest
- Bobby Quinn Rice as G.S.S. Conqueror Klingon Officer/Romulan Officer

== Production ==
The series was directed by Tim Russ and conceived and produced by Sky Conway. Best known for playing Tuvok on Star Trek: Voyager, Russ had directed one episode of that series. The series was shot on the Star Trek: New Voyages sets in Port Henry, New York. Scenes were also shot around the Los Angeles area, including at Vasquez Rocks, a popular site for Star Trek location footage. Scenes set at the Vulcan Science Academy were filmed in the San Fernando Valley. Principal photography began July 12, 2006, and finished in October 2006.

The series was produced with a budget of $150,000. Actors were paid according to SAG guidelines, but others involved in the making of the miniseries helped to produce it with little or no pay as "a labor of love".

== Returning Star Trek cast and crew ==
The miniseries starred Nichelle Nichols as Nyota Uhura, Walter Koenig as Pavel Chekov, Grace Lee Whitney as Janice Rand, and Celeste Yarnall as Yeoman Martha Landon (here, as special wedding guest) from the original series. Alan Ruck also reprised his role as Captain Harriman from Star Trek Generations, and Tim Russ appeared as Tuvok. Other regular Star Trek actors appeared in new roles, including Garrett Wang and Ethan Phillips (who respectively played Harry Kim and Neelix from Voyager), J. G. Hertzler, Cirroc Lofton, and Chase Masterson (Martok, Jake Sisko, and Leeta from Star Trek: Deep Space Nine), and Gary Graham (Ambassador Soval from Enterprise). The series was written by DS9 writers Jack Treviño and Ethan H. Calk. Douglas Knapp, the director of photography, had worked on Voyager.

Co-writer Jack Treviño explained how so many actors from the series had been willing to participate:

Trek actors have a special relationship with their fans ... they regarded the project, not only as the ultimate thank you to Gene Roddenberry and the original stars of Trek, but [also] as a thank-you to [the fans] who supported the series over the last 40 years.

Executive producer Douglas Conway had tried to assemble more of the original series cast, but when George Takei (Hikaru Sulu) was not available, this led to the idea of including Ruck's character as captain.

Three actors from Star Trek: New Voyages, James Cawley, Jeff Quinn, and Bobby Quinn Rice (Kirk, Spock, and Peter Kirk), also featured.

== Release dates ==
The press releases in July and October 2006 anticipated a Christmas 2006 release. On January 6, 2007, the first part of the series was announced as delayed until April. This was to allow the three parts of the miniseries to be released closer together, with the second part following in May, and the third in June.

On April 15, 2007, the planned release date of part one, the official website announced that the release of the films had been delayed yet again. On October 31, 2007, the official website announced that part one would be released on December 22, 2007. On February 20, 2008, part two was announced to be released on March 15, 2008. On May 22, 2008, part three was announced to be released on June 15, 2008.

In a May 2007 interview with Houston Chronicle blogger J. Kevin Tumlinson, director Tim Russ said the producers were attempting to distribute the project through current Star Trek franchise owner CBS, and if successful, they would sell the production as either a download or a DVD. The producers then clarified on the official forum that while "plans to release the series as a free download remain in place", licensing by CBS would be required for any versions for sale, e.g. DVDs.

In November 2008, Renegade Studios began giving free DVDs of the film as thank-you gifts to their online customers. As of December 2009, a new edition of the DVD with pop-up commentary trivia was being offered.

== Reception ==
The film won the 2008 SyFy Portal Genre Award for Best Web Production.

== Follow-up ==
Star Trek: Renegades, a series directed by Russ and with many others of the series team, was released on a nonprofit basis in 2015.
