= Vendetta (David novel) =

1991 tie-in novel by Peter David

- Front cover of the original paperback
- Author: Peter David
- Cover artist: Keith Birdsong
- Language: English
- Series: Star Trek: The Next Generation
- Genre: Science fiction
- Publisher: Pocket Books
- Publication date: May 1991
- Publication place: United States
- Media type: Print (Paperback)
- Pages: 400pp (first edition)
- ISBN: 0-671-74145-4

Vendetta is a Star Trek: The Next Generation tie-in novel written by Peter David and published by Pocket Books in 1991. The book was a New York Times best-seller, peaking at #4 on the Paperback Best Sellers list in late April 1991.

== Development ==
The novel was subject to a dispute between Peter David and Richard Arnold, who wished the Borg character Reannon to be removed, with the logic that Borg could not be female. This was prior to a regular female Borg character, Seven of Nine, appearing in Star Trek: Voyager. Because of this, the novel was printed with a disclaimer making it explicitly apocryphal.

== Plot ==
The plot centers around the actions of a woman named Delcara, from a race which has been assimilated by the Borg, who has gone to extreme lengths to exact her revenge upon them. Delcara controls a Planet Killer, later revealed to be the finished version of the one fought by the USS Enterprise during the events of "The Doomsday Machine" episode of the original Star Trek. This Planet Killer is also 'inhabited' by the psychic impressions of its creators which exist as part of its control system. Both Delcara and the 'ghosts' within the Planet Killer share a hatred of the Borg, and both Planet Killers are claimed to have come from just outside the galactic barrier surrounding our own galaxy. The Borg, having assimilated a Ferengi ship along the way, invade the Planet Killer, and force Delcara to attempt to reach Warp 10 in order to reach the heart of Borg space to exact her revenge before she dies from severe phaser wounds.

== Sequel ==
Peter David wrote a sequel, Before Dishonor, published in 2007 by Pocket Books (ISBN 978-1416527428). Kathryn Janeway and Seven of Nine feature strongly in this book along with Spock and The Next Generation crew, facing a new threat from the Borg.
