= Star Trek: Phase II =

Un-aired television program

- Series Logo from Writers/Directors Guide
- Created by: Gene Roddenberry
- Developed by: Gene Roddenberry; Jon Povill
- Starring: William Shatner; DeForest Kelley; James Doohan; David Gautreaux; Nichelle Nichols; George Takei; Persis Khambatta; Walter Koenig; Majel Barrett; Grace Lee Whitney
- Country of origin: United States
- Original language: English
- No. of episodes: 14 scripts (planned)

Production
- Executive producers: Robert Goodwin; Harold Livingston
- Running time: 50 minutes (planned)

Original release
- Network: Paramount Television Service (planned)

Star Trek: Phase II was the initial working title for what officially became titled Star Trek II, an unproduced American science fiction television series created by Gene Roddenberry as a sequel to (and continuation of) the original Star Trek, which had run from 1966 to 1969. The plans for the series were first developed after several failed attempts to create a feature film based on the property, coupled with plans for a Paramount Television Service (PTS) as a fourth broadcast television network in the United States.

Both PTS and the Star Trek revival were announced in early June 1977, with PTS to debut as one evening of programming each Saturday night and to gradually expand to other nights, a strategy successfully employed by the Fox Broadcasting Company a decade later. Star Trek: Phase II was to be the flagship show, and be broadcast at 8pm EST, followed by a movie of the week starting at 9pm. The initial order was for a two-hour pilot, followed by 13 episodes, each being one hour long.

With the exception of Leonard Nimoy as Mr. Spock, who had ongoing disputes with Roddenberry and Paramount, the entire regular and recurring cast of The Original Series were contracted to return, notably William Shatner as Captain Kirk. Three new and younger regular characters were created, science officer Lt. Xon, navigator Lt. Ilia, and ship's executive officer Willard Decker. Xon, Decker and Ilia were later influential in the development of characters on Star Trek: The Next Generation, and two of the scripts written for Phase II would be re-developed for use in that series.

Behind the cameras, Roddenberry recruited Trek-novices Harold Livingston and Robert Goodwin as producers. Veterans of The Original Series were few, and included costume designer William Ware Theiss and illustrator Mike Minor. Art director Matt Jefferies was otherwise employed and brought in as a "technical advisor" and to update the design of the starship USS Enterprise. Special effects (on set) were to be by Jim Rugg. Science fiction novelist Alan Dean Foster received the assignment to write the story outline for the two-hour pilot, but, with a looming production deadline and unable to find a suitable writer to develop this story into a teleplay, Harold Livingston took on the writing job himself. Of the remaining 12 script assignments handed out, about half were to veterans of The Original Series.

Pre-production began in earnest, with the emphasis on what would be the standing sets of the Enterprise, which differed radically in layout, design and detailing from those for The Original Series. Many costumes and props, too, were designed. Ultimately, Paramount's plans for its network and Star Trek's TV return faltered, as the low anticipated advertising revenues for the Paramount Television Service indicated that it was not viable, and the Paramount Pictures parent company Gulf and Western's chairman, Charles Bluhdorn, refused to back the plan, resulting in the eventual exit of Paramount chief executive officer Barry Diller. In August 1977 Paramount president Michael Eisner announced—internally—that the two-hour pilot script was to be the long sought-after feature film story. However, the "cancellation" of the series and network were not immediately disclosed in an effort to prevent negative publicity; accordingly, development of the series and its scripts continued for a further five months, during which time tests were filmed on the incomplete Enterprise sets in widescreen format—a clear indication that whatever Star Trek would be, it would not be a TV movie.

On March 28, 1978, any illusions that Star Trek would be returning to television were ended when Paramount announced that instead of a series it would be producing what became the big budget film titled Star Trek: The Motion Picture (1979), which was itself a massive reworking of the "In Thy Image" two-hour pilot script.

Preproduction work on the series did not entirely go to waste. The standing Enterprise sets would be extensively reworked for the film (and its eventual sequels), and an unfinished admiral's office set's walls became part of the Enterprise cargo deck. However, the visual effects people hired for the feature film decided that the miniatures under construction were not up to the standards of a post-Star Wars feature, and all were scrapped. Director Robert Collins, who had been hired to direct the pilot, and promised he was to direct the feature, was replaced by Robert Wise.

The concept of a "Paramount Network" led by a flagship Star Trek series finally came to fruition in January 1995 when Paramount launched the United Paramount Network (UPN) and the Star Trek: Voyager series.

== Background ==
Star Trek: The Original Series was cancelled in 1969, following three seasons on NBC. Afterward, it saw success in broadcast syndication, resulting in science fiction conventions being held for the fans of the show. Influenced by this success, Paramount Pictures soon sought to create a new film from the series. Series creator Gene Roddenberry told the Associated Press in March 1972 that NBC wanted a Star Trek television film as pilot for a new series. Barry Diller, the chief executive officer of Paramount Pictures between 1974 and 1984, later explained that Arthur Barron, the chief financial officer at the time, was pushing for renewing Star Trek as a low-budget film, and that any suggestions that Paramount's owner Charles Bluhdorn had some involvement were untrue.

In May 1975, Roddenberry signed a contract with Paramount for Star Trek: The God Thing, with a budget of $5 million. However, his contract was terminated in August of the same year after inviting several writers to pitch story ideas for the film. Paramount instead placed Jerry Isenberg in charge of the project as executive producer in July 1976. Chris Bryant and Allan Scott were hired to write a script, which they entitled Star Trek: Planet of the Titans. Bryant and Scott turned in their script on March 1, 1977, which was rejected by Paramount. The duo left the project, citing conflicts in the film's scope between Roddenberry and director Philip Kaufman. Shortly before the scheduled release of Star Wars on May 25, the Star Trek film was cancelled on May 9. Kaufman claimed that Paramount attributed this to the idea that science fiction fans would not go see two films released so close together.

== Production ==
=== Conception ===
The Paramount Television Service was announced on June 10, 1977. Seven days later, Roddenberry announced that Star Trek would be returning to television on the new service, saying that "Hopefully it will be even superior" to The Original Series and that casting would include "as many of the old faces as possible, as well as an infusion of new ones". At the time, The Original Series was being broadcast on 137 stations in the United States in syndication, and it was expected that the new television service would provide a single evening package that could be broadcast by these independent stations as well as Paramount's recently acquired Hughes Television Network. It was hoped that this station could become the fourth national network in the United States; Diller and his assistant Michael Eisner had hired Jeffrey Katzenberg to manage Star Trek into production, with a television film due to launch the new series at a cost of $3.2 million – which some claimed would have made it the most expensive television movie ever made to date.

Roddenberry said that the show would continue to cover modern themes in a science fiction way as had the first series, saying that these could include hijacking, nationalism, and radicalization of both individuals and groups. He also wanted to show 23rd-century Earth for the first time, and said that this had been the answer to Paramount executives asking him if there had been anything he wanted to do on The Original Series but could not. A further change was to be the number of female cast members, as NBC had a requirement of a maximum of one-third, and Roddenberry wanted to have them appear in authority positions.

=== Crew and production design ===
The expectation was that the two-hour pilot film would be broadcast in February 1978, with weekly episodes following, broadcast in an 8 pm EST timeslot on Saturday nights. Gary Nardino, who was placed in charge of the new network, said that "Star Trek was absolutely the lead horse of the new network. Because the advertisers recognized the strength of Star Trek in the syndicated market." Prior to commencing production on the new series, Roddenberry took a two-week vacation in order to rid himself of negative feelings about the way that production on the feature film had gone. He described his concerns saying that he did not want to "drag a corpse of anger, defeats and double-crossing behind me" onto the new show. Robert Goodwin was placed in charge of developing the feature films that would follow each week's episode of Star Trek, and the movie-length pilot as well. Roddenberry wanted to meet him, and despite Goodwin's lack of Star Trek background, he was convinced to be a producer on the series instead. Roddenberry described him as the "producer producer", in that Goodwin would deal with all the technical aspects of the production. For the screenwriting aspect of the production, Harold Livingston was recruited, who recalled that the technical/screenwriting split of the executive producer role was innovative for the time. Like Goodwin, Livingston had not previously worked on Star Trek, but had worked on Mission: Impossible, a different Desilu Productions television series.

Artist's illustration of the ''Phase II'' ''Enterprise''

Roddenberry was given complete creative control over the new television project by Paramount, which had promised him that it would be able to make the project a "first-class effort" with the budget to suit. Matt Jefferies, who had worked on The Original Series, was recruited as a technical advisor. He had designed the original USS Enterprise alongside Pato Guzman, but was unwilling to give up a position on the television series Little House on the Prairie for a 13-episode order on a new Star Trek series. Roddenberry was adamant that Jefferies was the right person to update the Enterprise, and agreed a position that the designer could advise the new show, but would have to choose between it and his main duties on Little House on the Prairie if the Star Trek work started to interfere. This occurred quite quickly, after Jefferies conducted design work on the new version of the Enterprise at a hotel in Tucson, Arizona, while on a location shoot for Little House on the Prairie, and could not attend meetings with Roddenberry and the producers in Los Angeles. He recommended Joseph R. Jennings as the main art director on the series; Jennings had worked for Jefferies during the second and third seasons of The Original Series. Jefferies' re-design of the Enterprise was based on the principle that the technology was updated over time, but the general silhouette remained the same. He highlighted that the engines would specifically be designed to be replaced, so the external design of them was completely changed. Brick Price Movie Miniatures was hired to produce the physical models of the vessel in two sizes, an 18-inch (46 cm) version for long shots, and a larger 5-foot (1.5 m) model built by Don Loos cast in moulds of fiberglass. Other models were built specifically for the pilot film included an open frame orbital drydock, tetrahedron shaped models for a space office complex and space taxi, and the golden head and neck of the impossibly long "Vejur" space entity.

Only a few former Star Trek crew members were recruited. Costume designer William Ware Theiss began working on new designs for the Starfleet uniforms, some based on his creations for The Original Series, others being a radical departure. Michael Minor—who had created set decorations and props for The Original Series' third season—was brought in as a production illustrator, working with Lee Cole in the Art Department under Jennings.

Other creations that were updated included the phaser, which were built to the same design as in the previous series, but were built out of aluminium instead of the fiberglass resin props used before. The battery packs were detachable, and contained actual batteries that activated strobe lighting on the main body of the prop. Technical advisers were recruited, such as Marvin Minsky, of Massachusetts Institute of Technology, and his wife Gloria Rudisch.

Set production was underway by the start of August, with stage 8 on the Paramount lot designated as the "planet set", while stage 9 was where the Enterprise sets were located. By August 9, the foundations of the bridge set was built, with a plaster mould used to produce fiberglass "skins" for the various prop consoles and walls.

By August 12, a writer's guide had been assembled. By August 16, Livingston had held pitch meetings with more than 30 writers who were interested in scripting episodes of Phase II. Some of these, such as Theodore Sturgeon, David Gerrold and Norman Spinrad, had previously written episodes of The Original Series. Also pitching to write an episode was Star Trek actor Walter Koenig. In order to have the scripts delivered in an efficient manner, Roddenberry decided that he wanted all the scripts for the first batch of episodes completed prior to filming began on the pilot. He was confident that because of The Original Series, that the writers would not have difficulty in writing new scenes with already established characters. However, Livingston and the writers did not know how the new characters would relate to the original ones. Despite this, Roddenberry claimed at the time that the relationships between the characters would take time to be built over the course of several episodes, and that fan reaction to certain characters and events would define how frequently they would appear.

By September, it had become apparent that they needed to hire a story editor. Roddenberry's assistant, Jon Povill, had already been conducting these duties on a script entitled "The Child", and so Livingston suggested that Povill should be recruited in that role permanently. Roddenberry disagreed, but Livingston threatened to quit unless Povill was hired. Povill was subsequently recruited as story editor, but Livingston said that this action was the one that caused a breakdown in the relationship between Roddenberry and himself.

The two-hour pilot film was to be based on a story outline Roddenberry had written for the aborted series follow-up to his 1973 Genesis II TV movie. That story, titled "Robot's Return" featured a gigantic alien craft coming to Earth searching for its origin. Alan Dean Foster, who had previously adapted episodes of Star Trek: The Animated Series in a series of short stories published in the Star Trek Logs series of books, was hired to adapt this story idea for Star Trek and in the process introduce the newly redesigned and refitted USS Enterprise and its crew, both old and new, as they confront a gigantic, aggressive, seemingly omnipotent alien intruder bound for Earth. With a looming production deadline and unable to find a suitable experienced TV writer to develop this story into a teleplay, Harold Livingston took on the writing job himself.

=== Cast ===
By August 1977, discussions had been held with the main cast from The Original Series, as well as some of the actors who had played recurring characters. While none had been signed at the time, Roddenberry expressed confidence that they could do so with the exception of Leonard Nimoy, who had stated that he would not return to television. However, Nimoy said separately that the first offer he received from Roddenberry for Phase II was only for the pilot and then guaranteed appearances in two out of every 11 episodes that followed, which he rejected. Nimoy and Roddenberry were not on good terms, following a legal suit launched by the actor against Paramount over merchandising rights featuring his likeness; Roddenberry had refused to support Nimoy in the case. There was also a problem with the return of William Shatner: owing to the pay he was to receive for the pilot and the first thirteen episodes, the studio wanted a contingency plan to replace him afterwards. Shatner was aware at the time that the plan was either to reduce his appearances after the initial episodes and reduce his ongoing fees, or—he believed—to kill off the character permanently if he refused the pay cut. Negotiations began with Shatner on June 10, but it was not until September 12 that his return was announced.

Phase II screen-test photo of David Gautreaux as Xon

Each of the returning former cast members was signed to contracts stipulating that they would be paid for the pilot and the 13 episodes regardless of whether the series went into production. They were also given substantial pay increases over what they had received on The Original Series. For example, DeForest Kelley was paid $17,500 for the first four weeks, then $7,500 per episode for the rest of the first season. Regulars actors including James Doohan, Nichelle Nichols, George Takei, Walter Koenig, and Majel Barrett had on The Original Series only had contracts for a certain number of appearances or been freelance players paid a daily rate, but here all were under contract for the initial series order. Roddenberry had expressed interest in including Grace Lee Whitney but she was not contactable at the time.

The problems with Nimoy and Shatner necessitated the creation of two new characters. In Goodwin's first draft show bible, he included descriptions for a new "Ship's commander" character, and a "Young Vulcan". The latter character was specifically attributed as being a second-cousin of Spock, and also a half-human/half-Vulcan. He also added a new Yeoman character, but Roddenberry was concerned at the time about the character, writing to Livingston "Simply adding a 'flunky' female to the bridge may not satisfy our needs for gender equality." This discussion began the process that resulted in the creation of Ilia, a new female character who was not intended to replace one of the previous cast members. In charge of casting these new members of the crew was Robert Collins, who had been hired to direct the pilot. Xon would later be changed to a full-blooded Vulcan.

David Gautreaux was cast as Xon on September 26, after approaching the casting director himself, having no agent. He had heard about the part, as he was dating the employee of an agent at the time. The final audition for the role had eight actors, including Gautreaux, of various ages and sizes. Gautreaux later said that the one thing they all had in common was a slightly alien appearance. He was hired to a $15,000 fee for the pilot, a guaranteed payment for the 13 episodes whether or not they were filmed, and a six-year option on his contract. Despite this, he was required to return for a further audition within a couple of weeks. Majel Barrett was due to return as Christine Chapel, this time as a doctor, and the actress was concerned that the romantic chemistry she shared with Nimoy might not work with a younger actor. She instead wanted an older British actor to play the role. Gautreaux, now with an agent, secured a further $2,500 fee to return and audition again, since it would cause him to miss out on a guest appearance for the same fee on the television series Fantasy Island. He retained the part, saying that the other actor was "absolutely abominable". It was only after this further audition that he was told what few others knew at the time: that Phase II had already been cancelled, and they were instead going to make a feature film.

Following announcements of Gautreaux's Xon replacing Nimoy's Spock, Gautreaux began to receive threatening fan-mail suggesting that he was going to be poisoned or dosed with LSD. He began to prepare for the role by purchasing a television set and watching old episodes of Star Trek, in order to portray the most accurate Vulcan he could. He fasted over the course of ten days and grew his hair long. Gautreaux sought out potential coaches who had worked on The Original Series, and later highlighted the help provided by Jeff Corey who had appeared in "The Cloud Minders". Despite not being a Star Trek fan previously, he said he had begun looking forward to portraying Xon by that point.

Phase II screen-test photo of Persis Khambatta as Ilia

On October 28, Persis Khambatta was hired to portray Ilia. She had been required to wear a bald cap for her screen test, although at this point the character also wore elaborate headgear in some footage. Roddenberry was insistent on this as a character attribute, but others such as Eisner hated the idea of a bald female character. His notes said that while a bald female character would be an interesting addition, it may prevent the audience from feeling at ease with Ilia and so the style may need to be given to a different character entirely. The auditions by this time were not held under the pretence that they were to play a part in a television series, but were openly talking about Star Trek becoming a feature film.

The casting for first officer Willard Decker had been delayed, both because of a slight delay in the production but also because the writers were no longer sure that the character was needed at all. This was despite auditions being conducted at the same time that Gautreaux was cast as Xon, during which, in his second audition with Barrett, he also read lines against ten actors competing for the role of Decker.

One further change to the cast was to have been the return of Grace Lee Whitney as Janice Rand. In 1977, having read the back cover of Susan Sackett's Letters to Star Trek book and discovering that one of the frequently asked questions sent into the production team was "Whatever happened to Grace Lee Whitney?", Whitney herself got in touch with Sackett and was invited along to meet with Roddenberry at his office in Paramount Studios. He was excited and happy to see her, and immediately offered to bring back the character for Phase II, describing the removal of Rand from The Original Series as his greatest mistake and blaming it on NBC executives. He said that "when Captain Kirk came back from having affairs with all these other women on all these other planets – he'd have to deal with [Rand]. What a great plot-thickener that would have been!".

=== Cancellation ===
A key premise of the "In Thy Image" story was to see Earth itself threatened for the first time in Star Trek. Producer Goodwin proposed that this story should be the two-hours pilot of the series at a meeting with Eisner on August 3. He would later recall that this specific meeting changed the direction of the franchise, as Eisner declared that Foster's story was the one that he had been looking for to make a feature, not a television, film. At the same time, Paramount had come to realize that the expected advertising revenues for the Paramount Television Service could not support a fourth network, and so there was no possibility of creating the series. By this point, costs for the series had already reached $500,000, and the studio was looking to recoup those expenses in some manner. The initial concept was to continue with the pilot, and then attempt to sell the series to NBC, CBS, or ABC. But the Paramount executives were concerned about losing control of a potential franchise, and by moving the pilot into a feature film, it gave them the ability to keep it in-house.

However, because of the number of times that a Star Trek film was announced in the 1970s, the Paramount executives decided that they could not lose face once more by making an announcement, only to potentially reverse the decision in several months time. Because of this, production continued on Phase II for a further five months after the decision was made that it would not go into production. By November, Livingston and Roddenberry were no longer working well together. They had each re-drafted "In Thy Image" themselves, and presented these versions to Eisner. The Paramount executive's response was that Roddenberry's version was suited for television, and Livingston's was better for a motion picture – and better overall. Collins was assigned to combine certain elements of Roddenberry's version into Livingston's and to complete that draft by the end of the month.

The first public announcement of the cancellation of the Paramount Television Service and Phase II came at the hands of the gossip columnist Rona Barrett at the start of December. In response, Paramount released a statement that said the new network had been pushed back to the fall of 1978, and that Phase II had its episode order increased from 13 to between 15 and 22. Despite this, behind the scenes, production continued on Star Trek as a film, not as a series. One of the changes around the same time as Barrett's reports was the realization that all the model work completed thus far had to be restarted from scratch, as it was not detailed enough to be shown at the scale of a theatrical screen. Two further changes took place in December: Collins was dropped as director, for Paramount wanted a motion picture director and not one with experience only in television; and Livingston allowed his contract to run out and left the production, owing to the poor relationship he had with Roddenberry. By January, Paramount no longer pretended that Star Trek was to be anything other than a feature film. Livingston was brought back, but only in a writing capacity, and Robert Wise was hired as director on the film to replace Collins.

== Scripts ==
Title	Written by
"In Thy Image"	Alan Dean Foster
The two-hour pilot that eventually became Star Trek: The Motion Picture. Alan Dean Foster's story outline was based on a premise written by Gene Roddenberry for Genesis 2, named "Robot's Return" and was also very similar to the 1960s Star Trek episode "The Changeling". A huge starship crosses the universe looking for its creator on Earth.
"Tomorrow and the Stars"	Larry Alexander
During a Klingon attack, Kirk orders an emergency beamup and is transported to Pearl Harbor, Hawaii, just before the Japanese attack on Pearl Harbor and falls in love with a woman living there. The plot is similar to that of the film The Final Countdown (1980) and of the Original Series episode "The City on the Edge of Forever".
"Cassandra"	Theodore Sturgeon
The Enterprise mediates a dispute between two worlds over "The Monitor", while a clumsy ensign takes care of an infant alien who can foretell the future. Based on the story of Cassandra.
"The Child"	Jaron Summers and Jon Povill
A being of light impregnates Ilia to experience life as a Deltan. The Enterprise's hull begins to fail as they come across a strange nebula. A revised version of this script was later filmed as an episode of Star Trek: The Next Generation.
"Kitumba"	John Meredyth Lucas
The Enterprise is sent to the Klingon homeworld to help Ksia, a tutor to the underage Klingon leader, to stop his regent from making war on the Federation. This would have been a two-part episode.
"Practice in Waking"	Richard Bach
The Enterprise comes across a sleeper ship where Decker, Scotty, and Sulu get trapped in a simulation of the 16th-century witch-burnings.
"Deadlock"	David Ambrose
While searching for a missing starship, the Enterprise is recalled to a Starbase to engage in a strange war game.
"Savage Syndrome"	Margaret Armen and Alfred Harris
While investigating an ancient starship, the Enterprise is hit with a blinding light that brainwashes the crew, reverting them to savages.
"Are Unheard Melodies Sweet?"	Worley Thorne
While searching for a missing starship, the Enterprise comes across a world in need of men.
"Devil's Due"	William Douglas Lansford
As the Enterprise makes first contact with the planet Neuterra, the mythical creature Komether appears to claim it, having purchased the planet in exchange for peace millennia ago. A revised version of this script was later filmed as an episode of Star Trek: The Next Generation.
"Lord Bobby's Obsession"	Shimon Wincelberg
The Enterprise comes across a derelict Klingon Cruiser with one life form aboard – one Lord Bobby from Earth's late 19th century.
"To Attain the All"	Norman Spinrad
The Enterprise gets caught in a solar system-sized logic game where, if you win, you "attain the All", a huge repository of knowledge.
"The War to End All Wars"	Arthur Bernard Lewis
Derived from part of a discarded script treatment about warring androids on the planet Shadir ("A War to End Wars" by Richard Bach), the Enterprise rescues a female android, Yra, whose planet's successful philosophy of "peace through war" has been corrupted by a leader named Plateous III.

== Legacy ==
After production was underway on The Motion Picture, and Nimoy signed up for the film, Gautreaux requested that Xon be eliminated from the script entirely instead of being shown in a reduced capacity. Gautreaux would go on to portray Commander Branch in the film instead, in his only appearance in the franchise. At the time of the production on the film, the idea was to keep Xon in reserve for a future film or television series. Gautreaux was subsequently called in for an interview with Nimoy during the early work on Star Trek III: The Search for Spock. The pair started talking about the impact that Nimoy's return to Star Trek had made on Gautreaux, with the latter telling Nimoy that he had treated it as a play that had been cancelled on the first night of the performance, which had not made a major impact on his career.

The Phase II sets were located on stage 9 of the Paramount lot. The main layout and structures remained when those sets were overhauled to appear in The Motion Picture and various following films within the franchise. The sets were re-worked and converted prior to the start of Star Trek: The Next Generation to appear on television for the first time, and when Star Trek: Voyager aired, they were used once more. It was only with the start of Star Trek: Enterprise that the setup of the Star Trek sets at Paramount were completely changed and the Phase II foundations no longer remained.

The idea of a young male Vulcan scientist was once again proposed early in the work on Star Trek II: The Wrath of Khan, which was attributed by later reviewers to the influence of Xon from Phase II. The gender of this character was subsequently changed to female, and called Saavik. She was played by Kirstie Alley in that film, and later by Robin Curtis in The Search for Spock and Star Trek IV: The Voyage Home.

Several minutes of test footage, including a view of the redesigned Engineering Room, costume tests with crew, screen test footage of Gautreaux as Xon and costume test footage of Khambatta as Ilia, were included in a featurette on the DVD release of the Director's Edition of Star Trek: The Motion Picture. The presence of a second five-year mission, as would have been shown in Phase II, was included in the Star Trek timeline in the Star Trek Chronology book by Michael and Denise Okuda in 1993. This would have taken place after the events of The Motion Picture.

A book based on the production of the series, Star Trek Phase II: The Lost Series was published in 1997 by Pocket Books. It was written by Judith and Garfield Reeves-Stevens, and went into detail about the conception of the planned and later aborted series, looking at several aspects of production, with behind-the-series information, color artwork, storyboards, blueprints, technical information and photos. It also contained two full scripts from the planned series.

James Cawley purchased the costumes that would have been used in Phase II, and later repurposed them for his fan series Star Trek: New Voyages. He felt that they represented the step between those seen in The Original Series and the uniforms in The Motion Picture. The series also made other references to Phase II, as Xon was added in the episode "Blood and Fire", which was based on an unused script for Star Trek: The Next Generation. In New Voyages, Xon was played by Patrick Bell. In February 2008, Cawley announced that New Voyages would be re-titled Phase II in reference to the abandoned 1970s series. The change was reverted following an announcement by Cawley on June 9, 2015.

=== Star Trek: The Next Generation ===
Phase II would prove influential on The Next Generation, whose creation began just over seven years later. The characters of Xon, Decker and Ilia were used as the basis for the creation of Data, William Riker and Deanna Troi. However, the series was allowed to be different in tone from the planned Phase II, for the feature films that had come before it had changed the audience expectations of what Star Trek was. It was originally proposed in Gerrold's The Worlds of Star Trek to have the second-in-command leading the away team, and it was anticipated that this would be included in Phase II – it was instead first introduced in The Next Generation.

Owing to the 1988 Writers Guild of America strike, work on the second season of The Next Generation was delayed. The producers sought scripts that could be put into production as quickly as possible once the strike was lifted, and so "The Child" from Phase II was picked as one that could be used in the new series with Ilia's place in the script swapped out in favor of Troi. A further Phase II script was adapted later in the series, when "Devil's Due" was converted for The Next Generation in the fourth season.

Certain elements of Klingon culture, such as the Emperor, and a general influence of Japanese culture with honor at the forefront, were first explored with the script for the two-part "Kitumba". Writer John Meredyth Lucas said that "I wanted something that we had never seen before on the series, and that's a penetration deep into enemy space. I started to think of how the Klingons lived. Obviously for the Romulans we had Romans, and we've had different cultures modeled on those of ancient Earth, but I tried to think of what the Klingon society would be like. The Japanese came to mind, so basically that's what it was, with the Sacred Emperor, the Warlord and so on." While the episode itself was later filmed for the fan production Star Trek: New Voyages, Star Trek first visited the Klingon homeworld in The Next Generation episode "Sins of the Father", and the themes would be revisited through the series.

=== Star Trek: Voyager ===
Judith and Garfield Reeves-Stevens described Voyager as the "conceptual cousin" of Phase II, in that it was used to launch the United Paramount Network (UPN) in January 1995. This was the fifth network, as Diller had moved to the Fox Entertainment Group in the years between Phase II and Voyager, where he launched the fourth network, the Fox Broadcasting Company. They hypothesised that Phase II would have seen a similar decline in ratings as seen by Voyager during the course of the first season, except this decline would have resulted in the cancellation of Phase II at the time of first broadcast in 1970s. While they felt this would not have been the end of the franchise, they suggest it would have resulted in a more immediate reboot with the entire crew re-cast.
