= Janice Rand =

Fictional character in Star Trek

- Star Trek character
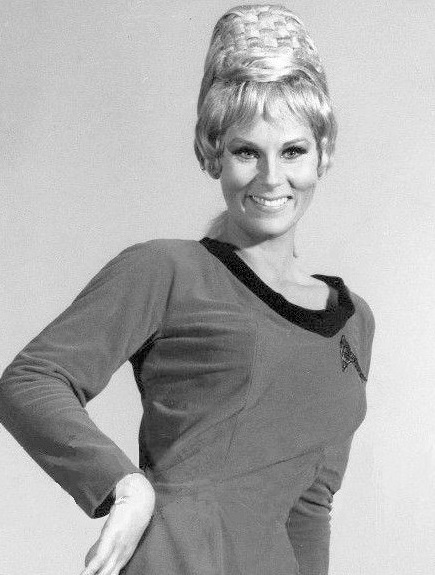
- Promotional photo of Grace Lee Whitney as Janice Rand
- First appearance: "The Man Trap"; Star Trek; September 6, 1966
- Last appearance: "Flashback"; Star Trek: Voyager; September 11, 1996
- Created by: Gene Roddenberry
- Portrayed by: Grace Lee Whitney

In-universe information
- Species: Human
- Gender: Female
- Title: Yeoman
- Affiliation: United Federation of Planets; Starfleet

Janice Rand is a fictional character in the American science fiction television series Star Trek: The Original Series during its first season, as well as three of the Star Trek films. She is the Captain's yeoman on board the USS Enterprise (NCC-1701), and first appeared in the episode "The Man Trap". She had significant roles in the episodes "The Enemy Within", in which she fights off an evil version of Captain James T. Kirk; "Charlie X", in which a young man with god-like powers becomes infatuated with her; and "Miri", in which she is infected with a deadly disease while on an away mission and gets kidnapped by jealous children.

Rand was portrayed by American actress Grace Lee Whitney, who had previously worked with Star Trek creator Gene Roddenberry in a pilot for a show he created called Police Story.

Whitney as Rand was involved in promoting Star Trek before it aired, but did not appear in the first two pilots. Roddenberry set out the role of Rand to Whitney, saying that she and Kirk were meant to have feelings for one another but should never act on them. Part way through the first season, Whitney was released from her contract. The official explanation was that the production team wanted to free up Kirk to have relationships with other women, but it was necessitated by Whitney's substance abuse. It is unclear who suggested that her contract should be terminated or who made the final decision. Roddenberry later blamed NBC for her release and said he regretted it.

After Whitney was reintroduced to Star Trek through conventions, she came back into contact with Roddenberry, who wanted to include Rand in the new series in development at the time, Star Trek: Phase II. This was subsequently cancelled, but she did reappear in Star Trek: The Motion Picture. Whitney made further appearances as Rand in Star Trek IV: The Voyage Home and Star Trek VI: The Undiscovered Country, as well as scenes in the Star Trek: Voyager episode "Flashback" set during the events of the latter film. Whitney made further appearances as Rand in the fan series Star Trek: New Voyages and Star Trek: Of Gods and Men, and Rand was also portrayed by Meghan King Johnson in New Voyages.

Prior to the start of The Original Series, Whitney promoted the series and was popular with the media. Critics later called the character a stereotype in her initial appearances, but the expansion of the role in "Flashback" was praised.

== Concept and development ==
Gene Roddenberry's original pitch for Star Trek featured a female Captain's Yeoman named "Colt". She was described as "blonde and with a shape that even a uniform could not hide." In this first version of Star Trek, she worked as Captain Robert April's "secretary, reporter, bookkeeper, and undoubtedly wishes she could serve him in more personal departments." Roddenberry's description of her ended with "She is not dumb; she is very female, disturbingly so." This character was cast for the first pilot of the series, "The Cage", with Laurel Goodwin cast in that role. A similar character was created for the second pilot, "Where No Man Has Gone Before", this time called "Smith", and she was played by model Andrea Dromm.

However, during discussions with the casting director on Star Trek, Roddenberry stood up in the casting process for three women he had worked with before – Majel Barrett, Nichelle Nichols and Grace Lee Whitney. Whitney had previously appeared in Roddenberry's unsold pilot Police Story where she played Police Lieutenant Lily Monroe. She was available to appear in the series and was promptly cast in the role, being paid $750 per episode and being guaranteed to appear in seven episodes out of the first thirteen. The casting led to rumours that she and Roddenberry had been previously involved romantically, something she strenuously denied later saying that "I never had a romantic relationship with Gene Roddenberry before Star Trek, during Star Trek, or after Star Trek." She admitted that he had made numerous passes at her, but she wanted their relationship to remain professional only.

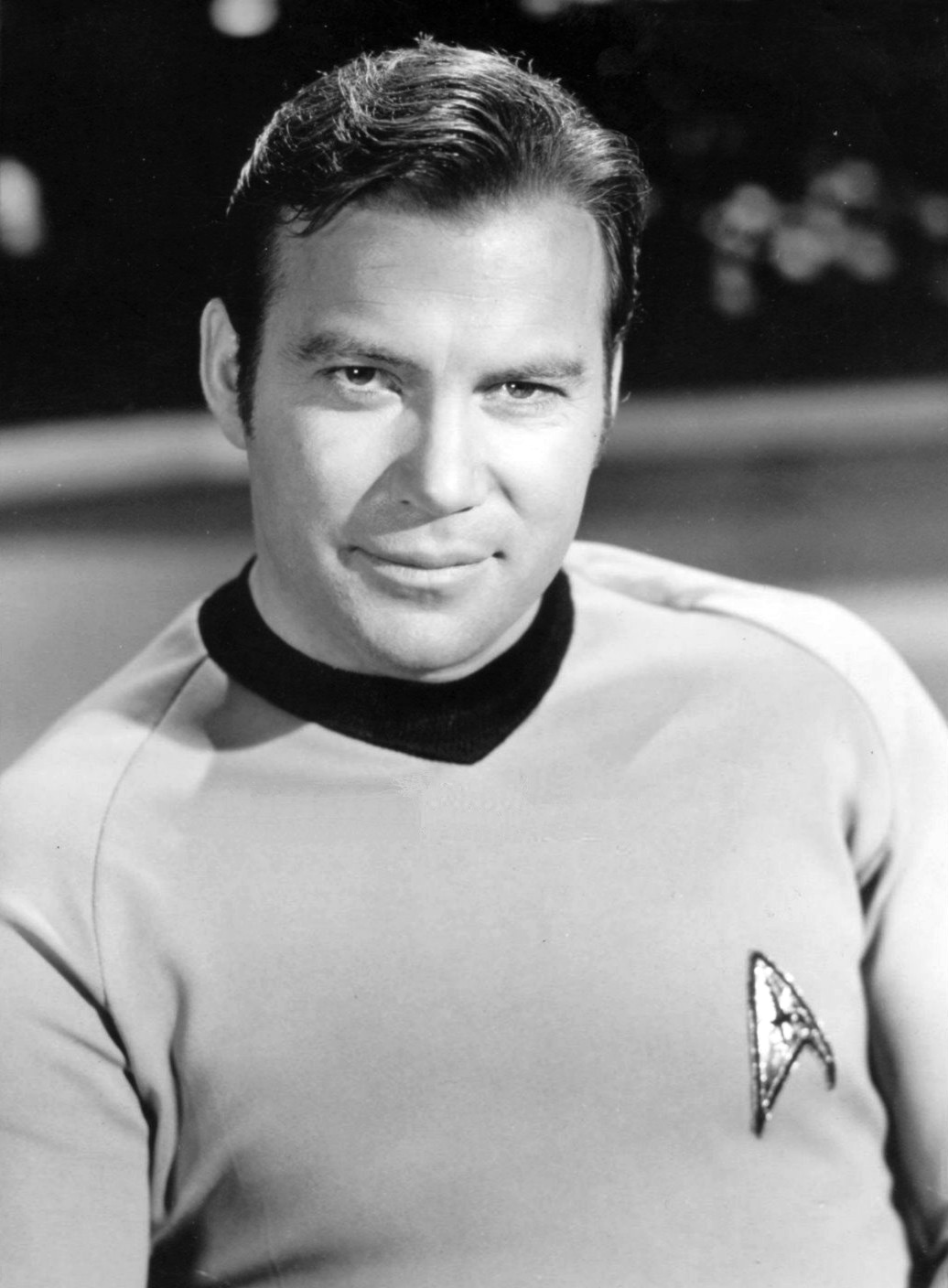
Roddenberry wanted Kirk and Rand to have an undercurrent of affection but never to act on it.

Roddenberry explained to Whitney that he wanted Rand to be Captain Kirk's confidante but never wanted them to express their affection for one another; instead he wanted it to be played as an ongoing undercurrent. In the early publicity photos, Whitney was dressed in the same manner that the women had been in the two pilots – a loose gold colored tunic and black trousers. She complained to Roddenberry about them hiding her "dancer's legs", so he had William Ware Theiss design a short skirt and tunic for her to wear, a uniform which was adopted by the other female characters on the series. She said the outfit was "sensational" and that "it stopped traffic". Despite the outfit being designed specifically for Whitney, Theiss was concerned and would tell her to lose weight. She was subsequently prescribed amphetamines by her doctor for the purpose of weight loss. Whitney stated that this was the start of her addiction to them, and in order to come down off them at night, she began drinking in the evening to take away the "edginess".

He also developed her hair styles for the series, which Roddenberry insisted must be unique and futuristic so that the viewers could believe they were seeing the future on television. She originally appeared with straight hair in promotion photos, but this was changed to a beehive, which was so solid looking that Bob Justman joked that "You could hit it with a sledgehammer and never make a dent." It was created by weaving two Max Factor wigs into a mesh cone. Whitney described the application of the wig, saying "they nailed it to my head every morning." It was created by placing a cone on her head and then weaving the blonde hair from two separate wigs together resulting in such an unusual look that Whitney said she was unrecognizable without it. In the press, she explained that on the show, Rand would have stuck her head in a machine which would have made up her hair instantly. The wig was later stolen from the Desilu lot after Whitney was no longer on the series; it was never recovered.

When interviewed by the media at the time, Whitney expressed enthusiasm in the role and about science fiction in general. She described Rand's role on board the Enterprise as "She's in charge of the other women aboard the space ship. She's Miss Efficiency." She also added that the character did not go into space "to catch a man." At the time, the media described Rand's position on the Enterprise as "chief female executive officer" and her image was used to promote the series before it began to air. Whitney enjoyed several of the episodes she appeared in, and found it hard to choose between "The Enemy Within", "Charlie X" and "Miri".

She was particularly affectionate toward the latter because it allowed her to appear on camera with her two children, and said it was her favorite. Certain elements of Rand's characterization were developed by Whitney and Shatner; Whitney would go to Shatner's side when their characters were put in danger – in response, Shatner would put his arms around her, such as in "Balance of Terror". The character was written out of the episode "Dagger of the Mind", which Whitney attributed to the romantic liaison that Kirk has with the female lead in that episode being so overt that it would have caused issues for later plots. This was because the script had Kirk and the female lead sleep with each other. Although Whitney found it difficult to watch as her character had been removed from the episode, she understood why. Part of her outfit was dictated by attempting to increase the duties of the Captain's Yeoman on screen. In order to provide support while part of an away team on a planet, Roddenberry suggested that she could wear a device on an over-the-shoulder strap which she could use as an electronic camera. He also suggested immediately that it could be expanded in order to be sold as a toy for young girls. This was part of the development process that led to the creation of the tricorder.

=== Departure ===
Grace Lee Whitney was released during the filming of the first season. The official reason given for Whitney's departure from the show was that her character limited romantic possibilities for Captain Kirk. This idea was supported by Whitney, saying: "They didn't want to give the fans the idea [Kirk] was in love with Janice Rand. That would limit him. They wanted him to go out and fool around. So, I was axed."

But the real reason was that the production had financial issues, with the acquisition of new crew members and the increase in popularity of Doctor Leonard McCoy meaning that those salaries needed to come out of the original budget. In Justman and Herb Solow's 1996 book Inside Star Trek, they stated that following a discussion between Roddenberry, Solow and Bernie Weitzman in which they discussed her contract, they decided to terminate it because of Whitney's limited appearances and the financial issues that the series was having. The decision was attributed elsewhere in David Alexander's 1995 authorized biography of Gene Roddenberry, Star Trek Creator, which said that during the first batch of episodes, casting director Joseph D'Agosta reviewed the contracts for the main actors due to rising costs.

At the time Whitney was guaranteed to appear in seven of the first 13 episodes, and contracted for four days work on each. However, she was used for nine additional days, leading D'Agosta to suggest to Roddenberry that if guest stars instead played the similar role but with different characters then they "would cost less and hold as much value". He added that they should instead look to using Whitney on a free-lance basis instead of under permanent contract. By September 8, 1966, (Note: This was also the date of broadcast of the first episode of Star Trek, "The Man Trap".) Whitney's agent had been informed that her contract had been terminated, which was around a week prior to the shoot of her penultimate episode, "The Conscience of the King". Roddenberry told Whitney that he did not want to lose Rand as he wanted her relationship with Kirk to continue. In a memo to Gene Coon on October 27, 1966, Roddenberry suggested bringing Whitney back as Rand, albeit with a different hairstyle similar to the way she wore it in Police Story as this "made her look much younger and softer", but she was never invited back to the series.

Because of Whitney's termination, drafts of the episode "The Galileo Seven" were revised to replace Rand with a new yeoman, Mears. Writer Paul Schneider was not informed of Whitney's departure when he submitted his first draft of "The Squire of Gothos" in early October 1966, so another character, Yeoman Ross, was then subsequently created for that episode. And Robert Hamner's September 1966 outlines for "A Taste of Armageddon" also included Rand; that part was then given to another new character, Tamura.

In Solow and Justman's book, there was also a reference to a "rift" between Whitney and Roddenberry that occurred just prior to her departure and was expected to ensure that she never returned to the series. In her autobiography, Whitney states that an unnamed television executive sexually assaulted her on August 26, 1966, while working on the episode "Miri", and she draws a link between this and her sacking a few days later. Whitney's departure was around the time when she was an alcoholic. In an interview in 1988, Whitney blamed her alcoholism and anorexia at the time for being released by the series. She later explained in an interview with Starlog magazine to promote Star Trek IV: The Voyage Home, that due to being adopted, she had a fear of rejection when she was younger which stemmed from her mother giving her away, and linked this to Star Trek saying "when I was let go from Star Trek, it was a psychic pain which pushed me into alcoholism. I couldn't stand the pain, so I drank to get away from it."

=== Return ===
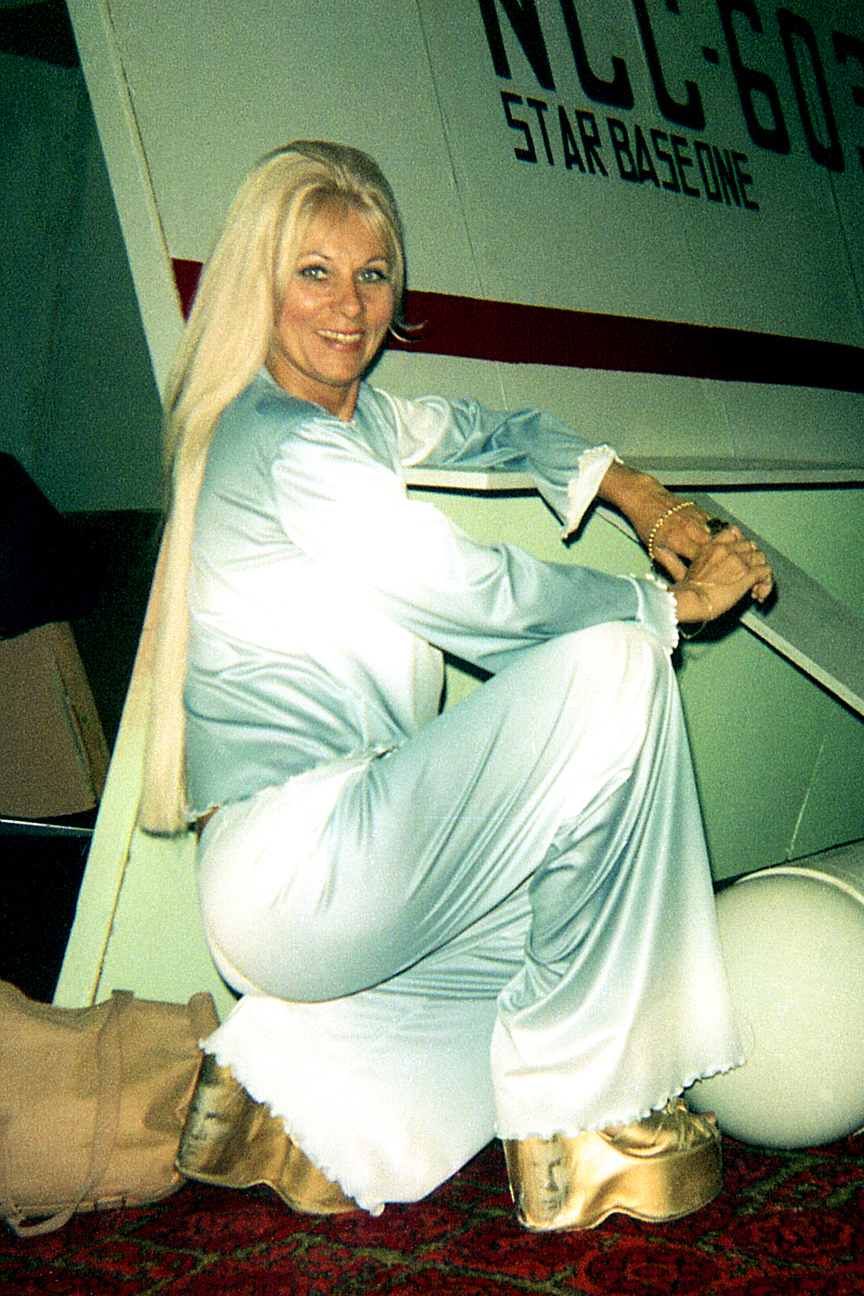
Whitney at a Star Trek convention in the mid-1970s

Whitney returned to the set on several occasions during the production of the series, and was also invited to come back for cast parties. But over time these visits decreased gradually as she found it painful to be on set with her friends, but not able to appear on the show. She was continuing to take amphetamines and had developed a drinking problem. Despite this, and despite Whitney being let go from the show, Harlan Ellison wrote the character into his original script for "The City on the Edge of Forever". Roddenberry rewrote the script, resulting in a feud between the writers – but the writer was also very disappointed in general that Rand had been removed from the series. After Whitney had left Star Trek, she dated Ellison for a time.

Whitney had no further involvement with Star Trek until 1976, when she happened to meet DeForest Kelley at an unemployment office in Van Nuys, Los Angeles. He informed her about a Star Trek convention coming up that was organised by Bjo and John Trimble called Equicon. She received such a reception upon making an appearance there that she was inspired to think more about the series and wanted to appear at more events. In 1977, after reading the back cover of the book Letters to Star Trek by Susan Sackett and finding that "Whatever happened to Grace Lee Whitney?" was one of the ten most frequently asked queries, Whitney got in touch with Sackett and was invited to meet at Roddenberry's office at Paramount. When he entered, he was happy and excited to see her and immediately offered to bring back Rand for the new television series Star Trek: Phase II. Roddenberry told her that removing Rand was the biggest mistake he had made, saying that the character should have stayed so that "when Captain Kirk came back from having affairs with all these other women on all these other planets – he'd have to deal with [Rand]. What a great plot-thickener that would have been!" Instead, he blamed the decision on executives at NBC, but apologized for it to Whitney.

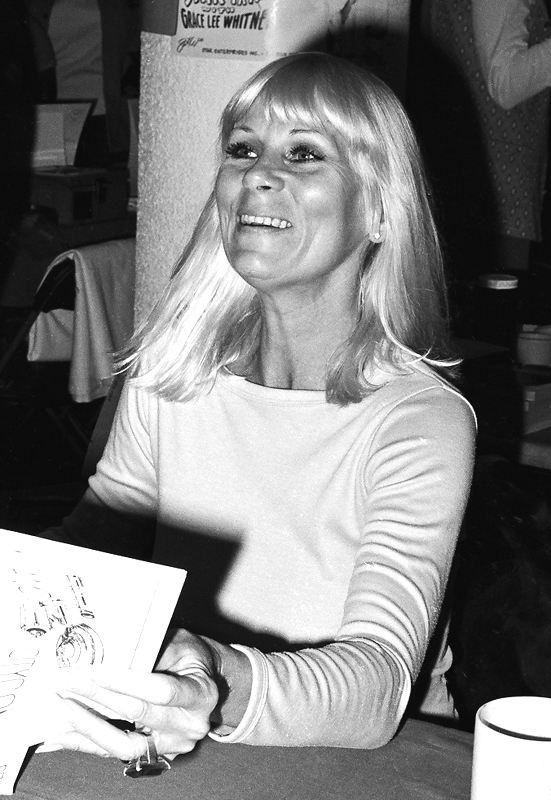
Whitney at a convention circa 1980

When Phase II was discussed in the media, the return of Whitney as Rand was one of the things highlighted. Two weeks before the series was about to shoot, it was cancelled by Paramount executives. Instead there was going to be a film. Whitney returned for Star Trek: The Motion Picture, with Roddenberry bringing her back as Rand who was now the transporter chief on board the Enterprise. The film reunited the entire main cast of Star Trek. She did not appear in Star Trek II: The Wrath of Khan, and was not in the script for Star Trek III: The Search for Spock. But for the latter film, Nimoy, who was directing the movie, gave Whitney a cameo as another character who was looking out of a window in spacedock watching the return of the damaged Enterprise at the start of the production. As he was also directing The Voyage Home, he was looking to give Whitney a larger role. By this time, she had hoped that Rand had moved over to become a counselor – an idea originally suggested by a fan. Alongside Majel Barrett as Christine Chapel, the duo were given four pages of dialogue initially which was trimmed down to one scene in the final film. Following the reappearance, Whitney was enthusiastic about returning as Rand, saying "I think Janice Rand is going to be around for a long time, as long as they don't kill our characters off, we have a chance of constantly coming back."

After a further appearance as Rand in Star Trek VI: The Undiscovered Country, Whitney returned for a final official appearance in the Star Trek: Voyager episode "Flashback". She praised the "incredible experience" and enjoyed working with Kate Mulgrew and Tim Russ. Following the appearance in Voyager, Whitney was supportive of a new Star Trek series focused on the adventures of the Excelsior with Rand appearing once more alongside George Takei as Captain Hikaru Sulu.

Following the relaunch of Star Trek in 2009 with a new cast playing those roles seen in The Original Series, there was commentary online about the lack of female characters and whether Rand might be appearing in future installments. While the sequel, Star Trek Into Darkness, was in production, Rand was one of five characters who was stated not to be appearing in the film by writer Roberto Orci. But there was still speculation at the time of the broadcast of the first trailer about who Alice Eve was portraying in the film. The options given by Tor.com was that it was either Janice Rand or Carol Marcus. Daily Variety reported that she was cast as someone new to the franchise, but she was actually cast as Marcus.

== Appearances ==
Rand's first filmed appearance is in the episode "The Corbomite Maneuver", wherein Captain James T. Kirk is annoyed that he has been assigned a pretty female yeoman and discusses this with McCoy. After Kirk is split into two beings in "The Enemy Within", the evil version of the Captain heads to Rand's quarters and reveals his attraction to her. He kisses her forcefully, but she fights back and scratches him across the face. Crewman Fisher intervenes and fights him off – the duo later explain that it was Kirk who attacked her to a surprised good version of the Captain, along with Spock and Doctor McCoy. In "The Man Trap", she becomes friends with Sulu while refusing the advances of Crewman Green. Kirk admits his feelings for Rand while under the influence of an affliction in "The Naked Time".

When Charlie Evans is brought on board the Enterprise in the episode "Charlie X", he falls for Rand. She is older than the adolescent boy and attempts to dissuade his affections by introducing him to Yeoman Tina Lawton. But he declares his feelings for Rand. Concerned, Rand seeks the advice of the Captain who intervenes and involves Evans in some sparring practice. After he falls over, he reveals his powers to make people disappear when one of the other sparring partners laughs at him. Charlie takes control of the ship, and goes to Rand's quarters with a rose. She refuses his approach; Spock and Kirk arrive but Charlie attacks them, and Rand slaps the boy. In response, he makes her vanish. It is only after a Thasian vessel appears that the Enterprise and Rand are returned to normal, as Charlie is taken away by the aliens.

Rand joins the landing party in the episode "Miri", and is infected by the disease that wiped out all of the adults on the planet. She finds comfort in the arms of Kirk, causing Miri to become jealous and the girl kidnaps the Yeoman to attract the attention of the Captain. Kirk convinces Miri to take him to Rand, but the other children attack him. They realise what they're doing is wrong and allow Kirk and Rand to return to the rest of the landing party – where McCoy has synthesized a cure for the disease. Rand's second to last appearance in The Original Series was in "The Conscience of the King", where she has no lines but shoots a jealous look at a woman Kirk is attracted to. Her final appearance in the original TV series was on the episode "Balance of Terror".

She next appeared in the 1979 film Star Trek: The Motion Picture as the chief transporter operator and non-commissioned officer on board the Enterprise. During the events of The Voyage Home, Rand was stationed in San Francisco as a communications officer, but was reunited with the other former members of the Enterprise when they are court-martialed at the end of the film. She subsequently served as a communications officer aboard the USS Excelsior during the events of The Undiscovered Country. The character's final appearance on screen was as part of Tuvok's memories of the events of that final film, as part of the Voyager episode "Flashback". Afterwards, Whitney remained hopeful that a new Captain Sulu based series would be created, allowing her to return to the role of Rand once more.

=== Non-canon appearances ===
Whitney made a further two appearances in Star Trek fan productions as Rand. These included the Star Trek: New Voyages episode "World Enough and Time", where Rand was once again on the bridge of the Excelsior alongside Takei's Sulu. Despite being fan produced, the episode was nominated for the Hugo Award for Best Dramatic Presentation. She also returned as Rand in the film Star Trek: Of Gods and Men. It was directed by Tim Russ, who she had worked with on Voyager, and featured a number of other former Star Trek actors. It was produced in association with New Voyages.

Rand was also portrayed by Meghan King Johnson in New Voyages. She was initially going to work on a film with producer Jack Marshall, but when that fell through, he suggested she worked on the Star Trek production. Johnson was first hired to portray Christine Chapel, with Andrea Ajemian playing Rand. However, Ajemian was re-cast to play Onabi in the pilot "Come What May", Johnson was moved to play Rand and Shannon Giles recruited to play Chapel. Johnson said that highlights of the role included taking the conn in the pilot, and later working around her pregnancy in the episode "In Harm's Way".

In print media, Vonda N. McIntyre's non-canon novel Enterprise: The First Adventure expanded on Rand's early history saying that she was originally a refugee, before being sold into slavery and enlisting in Starfleet. But in order to do so, she also had to lie about her age. Once on the Enterprise, she is teased by her new colleagues until her friendship with Uhura helps her to settle in and become the Yeoman that appeared on the television series. During the production of The Original Series, Janice Rand still appeared in the first draft of the script for the episode "The Galileo Seven", but was replaced by Yeoman Mears in later versions. When the comic book series by IDW Publishing based on the 2009 film revisited the events of that episode, this was changed to allow Rand to appear.

== Reception and commentary ==
In the initial previews for Star Trek when reporting on Rand, the media discussed Whitney's looks. The Independent Press-Telegram went as far as printing her bust/waist/hip measurements. Other newspapers were also complimentary of how Whitney looked, calling her attractive and shapely. Whitney said that she was popular with the media at the time because she was "very glib and very eager", but felt that she may have been seen to be overshadowing other members of the cast with her appearances. Her hairstyle was placed fifth in a list of unforgettable hairstyles in science fiction on Tor.com. It was suggested that when "you think of the 60s and science fiction hairstyles, the first image is probably Rand's beehive hair".

Rand's role is described within Terry J. Erdmann and Paula M. Block's Star Trek 101 as attending to Kirk, and bringing him reports, meals and coffee as well as having developed a crush on him. Jan Johnson-Smith, in her book American Science Fiction TV: Star Trek, Stargate and Beyond, said that Rand was one of a number of "recognisable stereotypes" of women who appeared in Star Trek. This was despite an initially progressive agenda towards women in authority by the appearance of Number One in "The Cage", which was rejected by NBC. Johnson-Smith described Rand's position as being a typical example of a female character who was only intended to be a romantic interest for a male lead.

Zack Handlen, while writing for The A.V. Club in 2009, said that Whitney was a "competent actress", but that Rand "represents some of Trek's most egregious offenses against feminism". He criticized her role within the show, and specifically in "Charlie X" when Charlie slaps her bottom and none of the characters can explain why he should not do that. Michelle Erica Green praised the "substantial" role given to Rand in "Flashback" while writing for TrekNation, adding that this was the first time such a role had been given to the character in the franchise. However, she criticized Rand's being written out part way through the episode as she felt that the character could have had more to contribute to the plot.

In 2015, SyFy rated Yeoman Rand as among the top 21 most interesting supporting characters of Star Trek. In 2019, she was listed as one of the underrated characters of the Star Trek universe by CBS.
