= Star Trek: New Voyages =

Fan-created series based on Star Trek

- James Cawley in Star Trek: New Voyages
- Also known as: Star Trek: Phase II (4–8)
- Genre: Science fiction
- Created by: James Cawley and Jack Marshall
- Developed by: James Cawley; Jack Marshall
- Starring: Brian Gross; Brandon Stacy; Jeff Bond
- Country of origin: United States
- No. of episodes: 10 (list of episodes)

Production
- Running time: 50 minutes

Original release
- Release: January 16, 2004 – January 15, 2016

Star Trek: New Voyages, known from 2008 until 2015 as Star Trek: Phase II, is a fan-created science fiction webseries set in the fictional Star Trek universe. The series was designed as a continuation of the original Star Trek (aka ST:TOS or just TOS), beginning in the fifth and final year of the starship Enterprise's "five-year mission". The first episode was released in January 2004, with new episodes released at a rate of about one per year. Production on new episodes halted in June 2016 following the release of new fan film guidelines by CBS/Paramount (after they sued the makers of Star Trek: Axanar) with three episodes in post-production left unreleased. The sets constructed for New Voyages were licensed as a 'Studio Set Tour' beginning in July 2016.

The series was the first such show with extensive standing sets, and that attracted the talents of a number of professional writers and actors associated with official Star Trek productions, including George Takei reprising his role as Sulu in "World Enough and Time", and Walter Koenig as Chekov in "To Serve All My Days". Eugene Roddenberry Jr., the son of Star Trek creator Gene Roddenberry, served as consulting producer.

The show's episode "World Enough and Time" was nominated for the Hugo Award for Best Dramatic Presentation, Short Form in 2008, alongside episodes of Doctor Who, Torchwood, and Battlestar Galactica, but lost to the Doctor Who episode "Blink".

== History ==
In April 2003, Star Trek: New Voyages was created by James Cawley and Jack Marshall. Jack Marshall came aboard as a producer with the idea to market the series on the Internet. The episodes are conventionally numbered as starting with season 4, to convey the idea of continuing from the original three-season series.

In January 2004, the first episode, "Come What May" (S4 E0), debuted on the Internet. The first episodes were filmed on new sets at a long-shuttered car dealership in Port Henry, New York, but production eventually moved to a former grocery store at 112 Montcalm St. in downtown Ticonderoga, New York. This facility is open to the public for tours and is officially licensed by CBS.

In 2006, Jack Marshall went on to work on the Battlestar Galactica reboot.

From 2008 through 2013, for a five-episode run beginning with "Blood and Fire" (S4 E4; December 2008) and ending with "Kitumba" (S4 E8; December 2013), the series title was changed to Star Trek: Phase II, before reverting to New Voyages.

In 2014, New Voyages creator James Cawley, who himself portrayed Captain Kirk in the first nine episodes (S4 E0-8), turned the role over to Brian Gross, deciding to assume a more behind-the-scenes role.

== Episodes ==
Between January 2004 and May 2016 some 11 full-length episodes and a number of short-form "vignettes" were released (see linked article). Three episodes were scripted by professional Star Trek writers: "To Serve All My Days" by D. C. Fontana; "World Enough and Time" by Marc Scott Zicree; and the two-part "Blood and Fire" by David Gerrold. Two other episodes were based on unfilmed stories for the unproduced 1978 Star Trek Phase II TV series: "The Child" and "Kitumba", neither with the permission of Star Trek rights-holders. Additionally, the episode "Mind-Sifter" was based on a piece of fan fiction from the 1970s.

When the series ended due to CBS restrictions in 2016 three additional episodes were in various stages of pre- or post-production.

Origins:The Protracted Man, a story based on David Gerrold's original pitch, "The Protracted Man", for Star Trek: The Original Series, was reconceptualized as a Pike-era story featuring the young Cadet James T. Kirk and his father, Commander George Kirk Sr. In January 2021, the incomplete work print for this abandoned episode was rediscovered and uploaded to YouTube (in two sections) by James Cawley. The episode was in post production and almost complete, missing only a few effects shots.

Torment of Destiny a sequel to the Star Trek: The Original Series episode "For the World is hollow and I have touched the sky" guest starring Richard Hatch star of Battlestar Galactica (1978) in what was his last television role. The footage was found privated on the New Voyages YouTube Channel and made unlisted. The episode was in post production when it was cancelled.

Bread and Savagery to the Star Trek: The Original Series episode "Bread and Circuses" around 20 minutes of footage mostly from promotional material can be found online. The episode was in post production when it was cancelled.

== Cast and crew ==
=== Cast ===
Character	0	1	Vignette1	Vignette2	2	3	4	5	6	7	8	Vignette3	9	10
Character	Come What May	In Harm's Way	Center Seat	No Win Scenario	To Serve All My Days	World Enough and Time	Blood and Fire		Enemy: Starfleet	The Child	Kitumba	Going Boldly	Mind-Sifter	The Holiest Thing
James T. Kirk	James Cawley	James Cawley	James Cawley	James Cawley	James Cawley	James Cawley	James Cawley	James Cawley	James Cawley	James Cawley	James Cawley	Brian Gross	Brian Gross	Brian Gross
Spock	Jeffery Quinn	Jeffery Quinn		Jeffery Quinn	Jeffery Quinn	Jeffery Quinn	Ben Tolpin	Ben Tolpin	Brandon Stacy	Brandon Stacy	Brandon Stacy	Brandon Stacy	Brandon Stacy	Brandon Stacy
Leonard McCoy	John M. Kelley	John M. Kelley			John M. Kelley	John M. Kelley	John M. Kelley	John M. Kelley	John M. Kelley	John M. Kelley	John M. Kelley	John M. Kelley	Jeff Bond	John M. Kelley
Montgomery Scott	Jack Marshall	Charles Root			Charles Root	Charles Root	Charles Root	Charles Root	Charles Root	Charles Root	Charles Root	Charles Root	Charles Root	Charles Root & Carl Sheldon
Nyota Uhura	Julienne Irons	Julienne Irons		Julienne Irons	Julienne Irons	Julienne Irons	Kim Stinger	Kim Stinger	Kim Stinger		Kim Stinger	Jasmine Pierce	Jasmine Pierce	Jasmine Pierce
Pavel Chekov	Jasen Tucker			Andy Bray	Andy Bray	Andy Bray	Andy Bray	Andy Bray	Jonathan Zungre	Jonathan Zungre	Jonathan Zungre	Jonathan Zungre		
Hikaru Sulu			John Lim		John Lim	John Lim			J.T. Tepnapa	J.T. Tepnapa			Shyaporn Theerakulstit	Shyaporn Theerakulstit
Vincent DeSalle	Ron Boyd	Ron Boyd	Ron Boyd		Ron Boyd	Ron Boyd	Ron Boyd	Ron Boyd	Ron Boyd	Ron Boyd	Ron Boyd			
Janice Rand	Meghan King Johnson	Meghan King Johnson					Meghan King Johnson	Meghan King Johnson	Meghan King Johnson					
Kargh		John Carrigan		John Carrigan	John Carrigan			John Carrigan			John Carrigan			
Christine Chapel	Shannon Giles	Shannon Giles			Shannon Giles									
Peter Kirk							Bobby Quinn Rice	Bobby Quinn Rice	Bobby Quinn Rice	Bobby Quinn Rice	Bobby Quinn Rice	Bobby Quinn Rice		
Xon							Patrick Bell	Patrick Bell	Patrick Bell	Patrick Bell	Patrick Bell		Patrick Bell	Patrick Bell
Walkingbear												Wayne W. Johnson	Wayne W. Johnson	Wayne W. Johnson
Withrow												Robert Withrow	Robert Withrow	Robert Withrow
Admiral Leslie	Eddie Paskey													
Matthew Jefferies	John Winston													
Matt Decker		William Windom												
Korogh		Malachi Throne												
Pavel Chekov					Walter Koenig									
Rayna Morgan					Mary Rapelye									
Hikaru Sulu						George Takei								
Alana Sulu						Christina Moses								
Janice Rand						Grace Lee Whitney								
Dr. Jenna Yar								Denise Crosby						
Alersa									BarBara Luna					

=== Crew ===
Original cast, left to right: Bray, Irons, Quinn, Cawley, Kelley, Root, and Lim.

The Star Trek: New Voyages pilot episode was produced by James Cawley, Jack Marshall (series director at the time), Pearl Marshall, Doug Drexler (under the pseudonym "Max Rem") and Jerry Yuen. Episode 1 was produced by James Cawley, Jack Marshall, Pearl Marshall, Max Rem, Amanda Stryker, James Lowe, Jeff Quinn, John Muenchrath and Rod Roddenberry (Gene Roddenberry's son). Episode 2 was produced by James Cawley, Jack Marshall, Erik Goodrich, James Lowe, Jeff Quinn, John Muenchrath and Rod Roddenberry.

The pilot and the first two episodes were directed by Jack Marshall. However, after filming of "To Serve All My Days" it was announced (December 29, 2005) that Marshall would leave the series. Marshall had been offered a position with the visual effects team of Battlestar Galactica and moved from Washington DC in February 2006 to Los Angeles California. Max Rem continued his participation for another 6 months of post production and then also left the project.

July 2013 saw major announcements for production of the series, with James Cawley leaving the role of Captain Kirk to focus solely on production of the show and original series writer David Gerrold taking on the duties of Executive Showrunner in hopes of producing episodes with greater regularity. Gerrold also personally announced that due to an overwhelming backlog, the show would no longer accept script submissions, nor would any episodes based on existing Star Trek books, comics, stories or other published works be adapted to the series – due to a request by CBS legal in the fall of 2011. Rather, all further episodes will come from original works by previous Star Trek writers or crew associated with the series.

== Trek alumni support ==
Several past members of the Star Trek cast and crew have expressed support for the project, and even contributed to it.

=== Guest actors ===
Actor	Character	Episode(s)	Notes/Star Trek connection(s)
Walter Koenig	Pavel Chekov	"To Serve All My Days"	Koenig played Chekov in the Original Series and subsequent films.
George Takei	Hikaru Sulu	"World Enough and Time"	Takei played Sulu in the Original Series and subsequent films.
Grace Lee Whitney	Janice Rand	"World Enough and Time"	Whitney reprises her TOS role of Janice Rand in the third episode as an officer on Sulu's ship, the USS Excelsior. (This connects to her appearances as an Excelsior crew member in the film Star Trek VI: The Undiscovered Country and the Star Trek: Voyager episode "Flashback.")
Denise Crosby	Dr. Jenna Natasha Yar	"Blood and Fire"	Played the characters of Lieutenant Tasha Yar and Sela in Star Trek: The Next Generation. Also hosted/co-produced the films Trekkies and Trekkies 2. Her character here has been referred to in promotional material for this episode as Yar's grandmother, and even goes so far as to refer to herself as Jenna Natasha Yar.
Mary Linda Rapelye	Ambassador Rayna Morgan	"To Serve All My Days"	Rapelye appeared as "space hippie" and former Chekov love interest Irina Galliulin in TOS episode "The Way to Eden."
William Windom	Commodore Matt Decker	"In Harm's Way"	Windom reprises his role of Commodore Decker from nearly 40 years earlier in TOS episode "The Doomsday Machine."
Malachi Throne	Korogh (Kargh's father) and Commodore José Méndez (voice)	"In Harm's Way"	Throne played Commodore José Méndez in TOS episode "The Menagerie" and Romulan Senator Pardek in the TNG episode "Unification."
Eddie Paskey	Admiral Leslie	"Come What May"	Paskey plays the father of Lt. Leslie, an uncredited but frequent character he portrayed in the original series.
John Winston	Captain Matthew Jefferies	"Come What May"	Winston played the transporter chief and relief helmsman Lieutenant Kyle in the original series, reprising the role in Star Trek II: The Wrath of Khan as a communications officer on starship Reliant. His character's name here pays homage to Matt Jefferies, who co-designed the original starship Enterprise.

=== Other support ===
The first episode, "In Harm's Way," features Rod Roddenberry, the son of Star Trek creator Gene Roddenberry, as a consulting producer. Sam Witwer is the voice of the Guardian of Forever (credited as "Simon Judas Raye").

For the second episode, "To Serve All My Days," written by original series writer D.C. Fontana, original cast member Walter Koenig reprises his role as Pavel Chekov. Mary-Linda Rapelye (Irina Galliulin in the original series episode "The Way to Eden") appears as an ambassador.

The third episode, "World Enough and Time," was co-authored by Marc Scott Zicree and Michael Reaves. Zicree, who also directed the episode, contributed the stories for the "First Contact" episode of Star Trek: The Next Generation and "Far Beyond the Stars" for Star Trek: Deep Space Nine. Reaves, who co-wrote (with Diane Duane) the "Where No One Has Gone Before" episode of Star Trek: The Next Generation, originally pitched a story to the unproduced Star Trek: Phase II series in which Sulu ages by thirty years, and that story served as the basis for this New Voyages episode. Majel Barrett Roddenberry provided the computer voice in this episode.

=== Legal status and controversy ===
Like all fan-films, New Voyages existed at the whim of the Star Trek franchise owners CBS (and previously Paramount Pictures), which previously tolerated the distribution of fan-created material as long as no attempt was made to profit from it.

This tolerance was tested in early 2012 when New Voyages announced that they would film "He Walked Among Us," an unproduced script that Norman Spinrad had sold to the original series. But when CBS claimed ownership of the material, the plans were canceled. CBS had not protested over the series's use of "Blood and Fire", which had been written for Star Trek: The Next Generation; "The Child", and "Kitumba", which had been similarly developed in the late 1970s for the aborted series Star Trek: Phase II, or Mind-Sifter published by Bantam Books, because they were written before the Star Trek movies directed by JJ Abrams were in production. ("The Child" was produced for "Star Trek: The Next Generation.) CBS wants to keep all material it has previously purchased or licensed in any way as possible work to be drawn on for future licensed films.

New Voyages' legal status was ultimately decided in 2016 following the release of new Star Trek fan film guidelines (in response to the Prelude to Axanar controversy) which forbid the production of all Star Trek fan series and any fan productions that included staff who had worked on or appeared in official Star Trek works. This included much of the staff and cast of New Voyages, including creator James Cawley (who cameos in the 2009 Star Trek film). Production on New Voyages was halted in response, with three episodes in various states of production left unfinished. Following this, the sets for New Voyages were licensed by CBS to serve as the Star Trek: Original Series Set Tour.

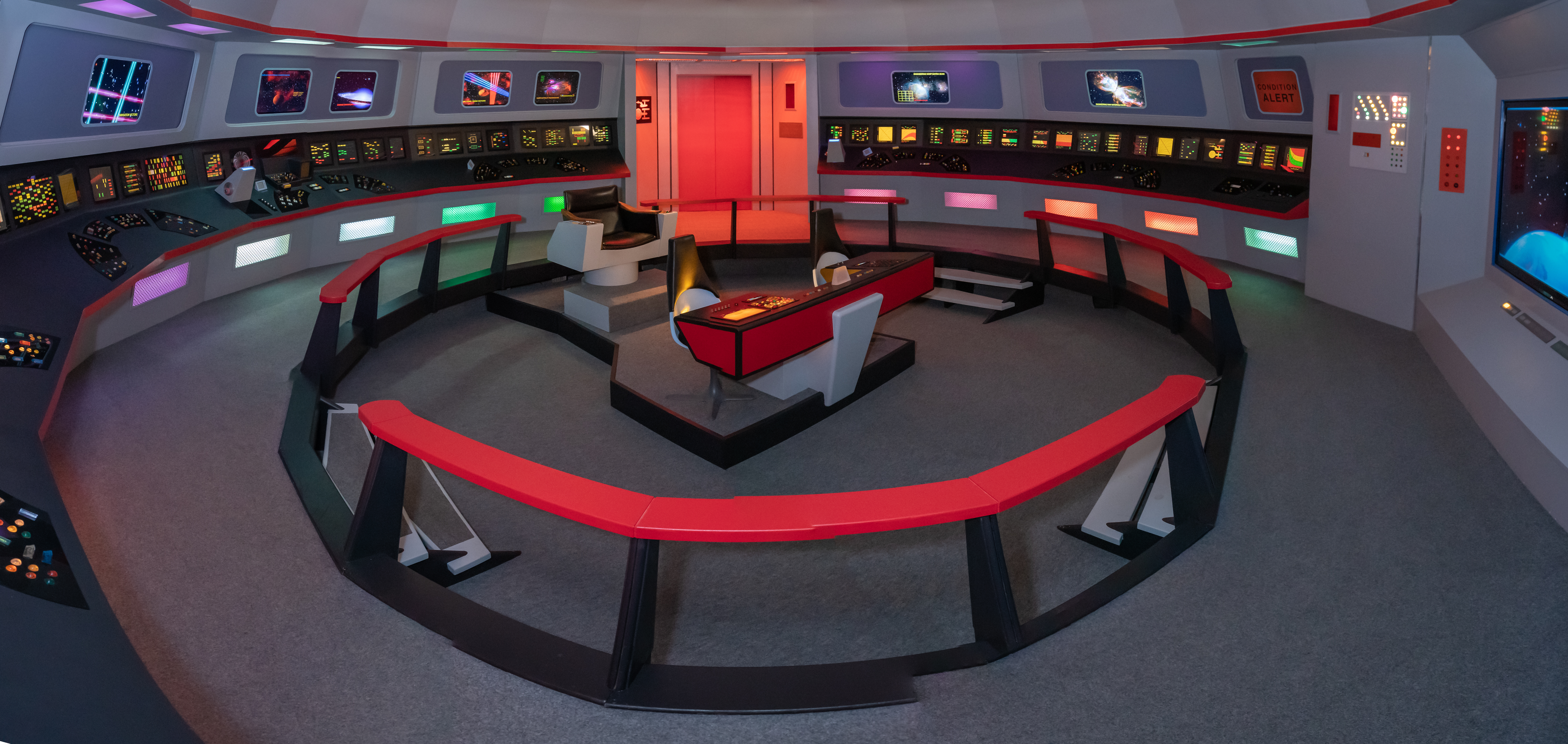
Bridge set

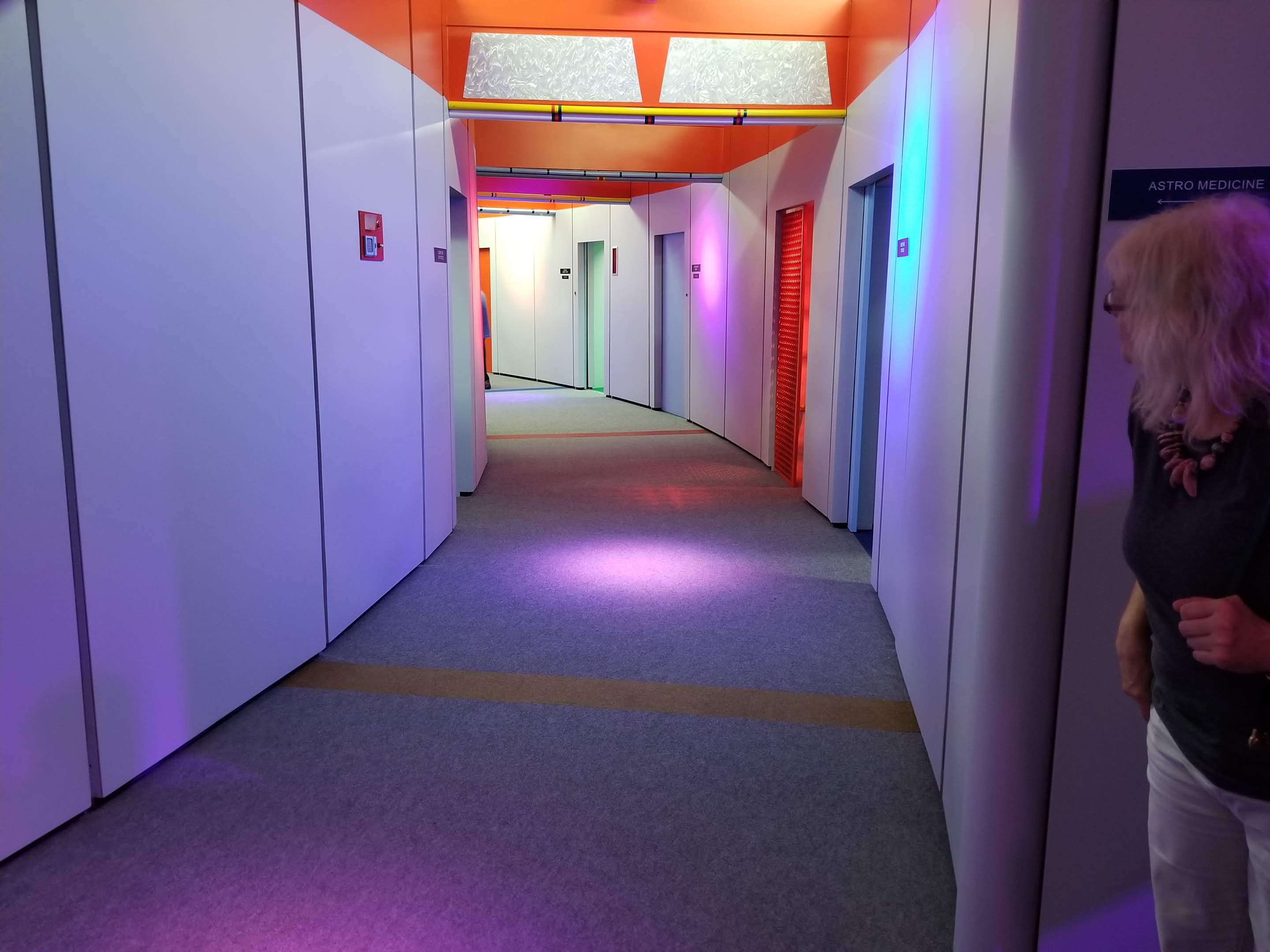
Corridor

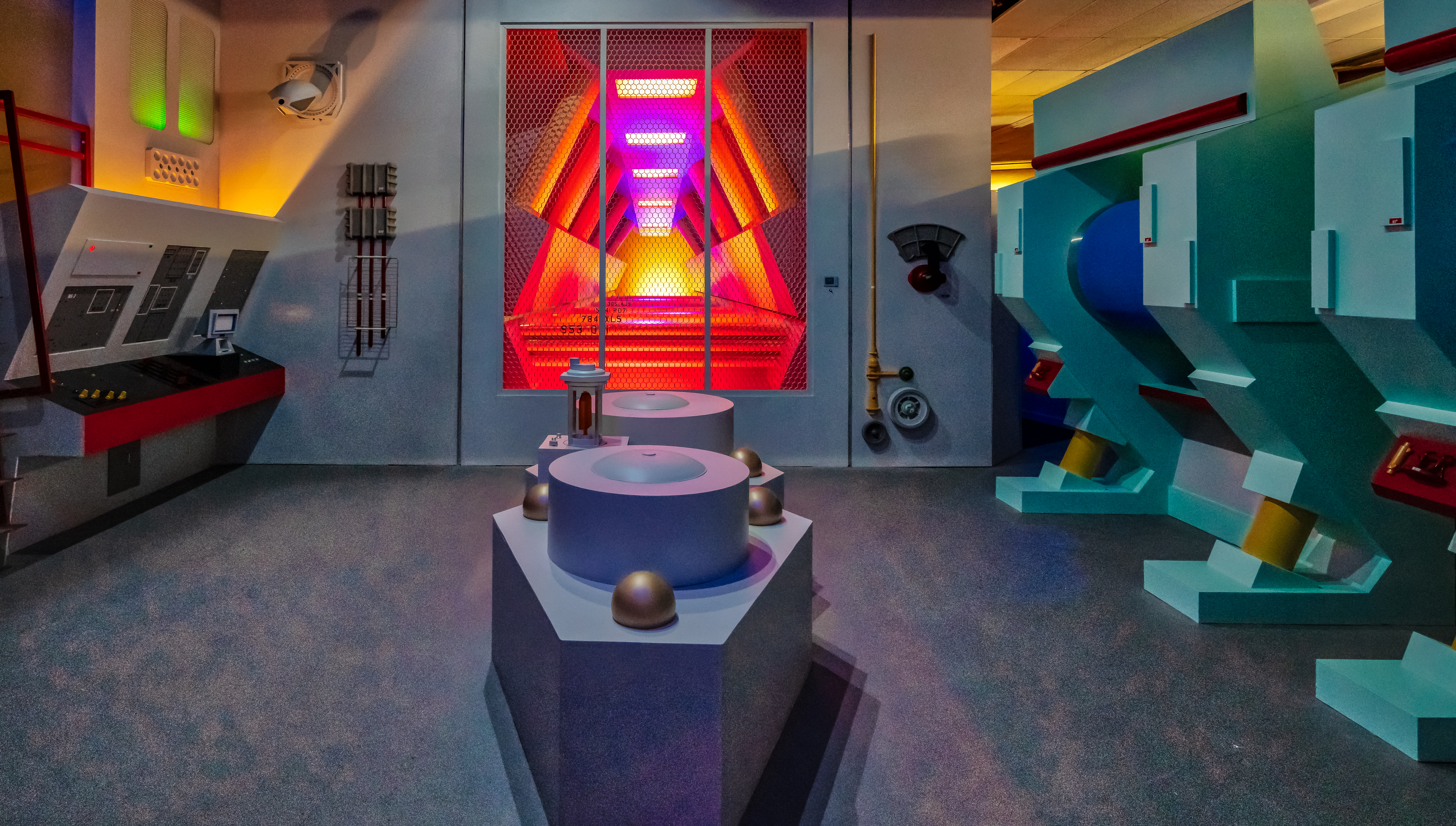
Engineering

== Production notes ==
The pilot episode, "Come What May", begins with the late-1960s NBC "In Living Color" sequence. It ends, as did the 1960s episodes, with the animated Desilu Productions logo, with no mention of Paramount. Starting with "Enemy: Starfleet", the series uses the late-60s CBS color opening (reflecting the series' current ownership by CBS Television Studios) and ends with the logo of Cawley Entertainment Company, Cawley's production company.

Inspired by the Star Trek: The Next Generation episode "Lower Decks", James Cawley and Carlos Pedraza had plans in 2007 to develop a series of stories called First Voyages to show "what it's like to be a 'grunt' on a starship", and with Peter Kirk (Bobby Rice) as the center of these stories focusing on a group of friends from the academy. Another character would be Xon, which had been developed for Star Trek: Phase II around 1977. A pilot episode, "Pomp and Circumstance" would be a New Voyages episode that would spin off into its own series.Though eight episodes were charted, the series didn't materialize. But some components were incorporated into New Voyages, such as Peter Kirk and Xon in "Blood and Fire" and a CGI-model of a Klingon "Bird of Prey" which was used in "To Serve All My Days".

== Awards ==
The 2015 Independent Star Trek Fan Film Awards
Category	Episode	Nominee(s)	Result
Best Production Design	"Mind-Sifter"	James Cawley	Finalist
Best Visual Effects	"Mind-Sifter"	Bing Bailey, Ryan Block, Daren Dochterman, Jeff Forsythe, Pony R. Horton, Tobias Richter, Lee Stringer	Finalist
Best Soundtrack	"Mind-Sifter"	George Duning, Gerald Fried, Sol Kaplan, Mark Edward Lewis, Joseph Mullendore, Fred Steiner (Composers); Jeff Bond (Music Editor)	Finalist
Best Original Story or Screenplay	"Mind-Sifter"	Rick Chambers, Shirley Maiewski	Finalist
Best Supporting Actor or Actress	"Mind-Sifter"	Clay Sayre as Kor	Winner
Best Supporting Actor or Actress	"Mind-Sifter"	Robert Withrow as Admiral Withrow	Finalist
Best Supporting Actor or Actress	"Mind-Sifter"	Rivkah Raven Wood as Dr. Hamlin	Finalist
Best Director	"Mind-Sifter"	Mark Edward Lewis	Finalist
Best Dramatic Presentation, Long Form	"Mind-Sifter"	James Cawley (Executive Producer)	Finalist
Best Cinematography	"Mind-Sifter"	Jeff Barklage, s.o.c.	Finalist

The 2017 Independent Star Trek Fan Film Awards
Category	Episode	Nominee(s)	Result
Best Special & Visual Effects	"The Holiest Thing"	Howard Brown, Pony R. Horton, Tobias Richter	Finalist
Best Sound Design, Editing & Mixing	"The Holiest Thing"	Jesse Akins, Coleman Clarke, Tony Falvo, Mark Edward Lewis	Finalist
Best Makeup & Hairstyling	"The Holiest Thing"	Jim Bray, Rob Burman, Brian Holloway, Dale Morton, William J. Teegarden, Rivkah Raven Wood	Finalist
Best Costuming	"The Holiest Thing"	James Cawley, Gwendolyn Wilkins, Patty Wright	Finalist
Best Guest Actor or Actress	"The Holiest Thing"	Jacy King as Doctor Carol Marcus	Finalist
Best Dramatic Presentation, Long Form	"The Holiest Thing"	James Cawley, Daren Dochterman, Gary Evans, Gregory L. Schnitzer (Executive Producers)	Finalist

== See also ==
- Star Trek fan productions
- Star Trek Continues is another fan made series also modeled on the original Star Trek series
