= Marc Scott Zicree =

American novelist

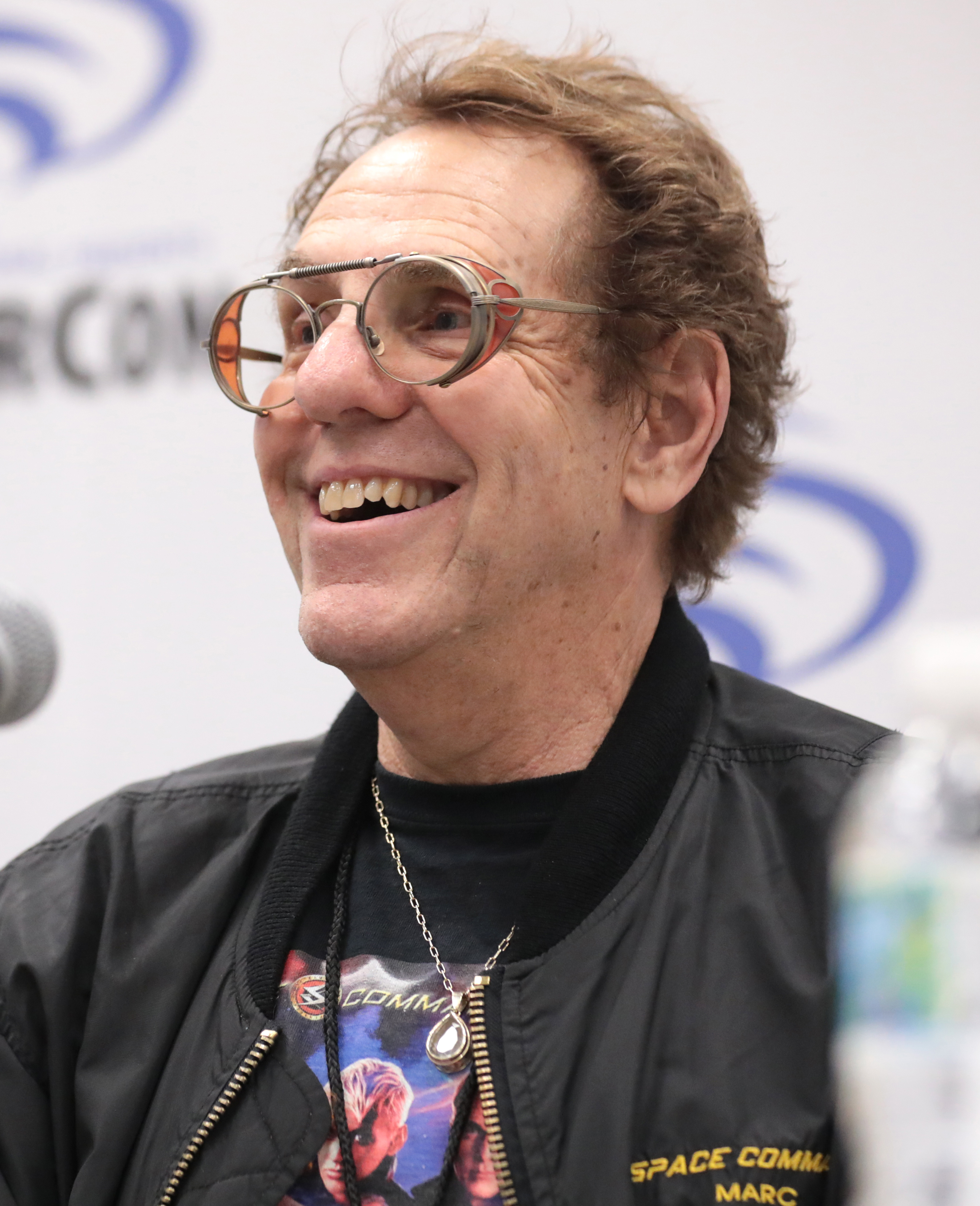
- Zicree at the 2023 WonderCon
- Born: 1955 (age 70–71)
- Occupations: Science fiction writer; television writer; novelist
- Notable work: The Twilight Zone Companion (1982); Magic Time trilogy (2002–05)
- Website: marczicree.com

Marc Scott Zicree (born 1955) is an American science fiction author, television writer and screenwriter. Zicree has written for major studios and networks including Paramount, Universal, Disney, Sony/Columbia Tri-Star, MGM, New Line, CBS, NBC, ABC, Fox, WB, UPN, Showtime, PBS, Turner, USA, Syfy, Discovery, Nickelodeon, the BBC, Marvel and NPR. His credits include Star Trek: The Next Generation, Deep Space Nine, The Twilight Zone, Babylon 5, Beauty and the Beast, Forever Knight, Sliders, Friday the 13th: The Series, Liberty's Kids, Super Friends, He-Man and the Masters of the Universe, Real Ghostbusters, The Smurfs and many others, as well as pilots for CBS, NBC, ABC and Showtime.

== Career ==
He is the author of The Twilight Zone Companion, a detailed history of Rod Serling's TV series The Twilight Zone. Several of his interviews with The Twilight Zone actors, directors and producers are available as special features on the Twilight Zone: The Complete Definitive Collection DVD box set, and are accessible as alternative audio tracks for the associated episodes. He has also contributed to the Magic Time novel trilogy, a collaborative effort between Zicree and three other science fiction writers.

=== Space Command ===
With writer Michael Reaves and director Neil Johnson, and using crowd funding for financing, Zicree is working on a series of films under the umbrella title Space Command. A Kickstarter project page, launched by Zicree in May 2012, raised funds of $75,000 (its initial goal) in three days, and went on to raise over $220,000 during the Kickstarter campaign, making it one of the most successful crowd funding campaigns as of that date.

The Space Command series features Doug Jones, Robert Picardo, Bill Mumy, Mira Furlan, Bruce Boxleitner, Nichelle Nichols, Barbara Bain, Christina Moses, Elizabeth Chamberlain, Ethan McDowell, Bryan McClure, with Neil deGrasse Tyson appearing as himself.

The film Space Command: Redemption was released in 2024 with Zicree appearing as the "Grizzled Space Jockey".

== Works ==
=== Non-fiction books ===
- The Twilight Zone Companion (1982)
- Greenlighting Yourself Living the Hollywood Dream (2022)

=== Novels ===
- Magic Time series
  - Magic Time (with Barbara Hambly, 2002)
  - Magic Time: Angelfire (written by Maya Bohnhoff, based on Zicree's concept, 2003)
  - Magic Time: Ghostlands (with Robert Charles Wilson, 2005)

=== Television credits ===
- Space Stars (1981)
- Blackstar (1981)
- The Incredible Hulk (1983)
- He-Man and the Masters of the Universe (1983)
- The Biskitts (1983)
- The Smurfs (1983)
- Super Friends (1984)
- Mighty Orbots (1984)
- The Get Along Gang (1984)
- Pole Position (1984)
- The Littles (1984)
- The Centurions (1986)
- Galaxy High (1986)
- Bionic Six (1987)
- Captain Power and the Soldiers of the Future (1987)
- The Real Ghostbusters (1987)
- Friday the 13th: The Series (1987)
- Swamp Thing (1990)
- James Bond Jr. (1991)
- Star Trek: The Next Generation (1991)
- Beyond Reality (1991)
- ABC Weekend Specials (1992)
- Babylon 5 (1992)
- M.A.N.T.I.S. (1994)
- Phantom 2040 (1994-1995)
- Forever Knight (1995)
- Space Precinct (1995)
- TekWar (1995)
- The Lazarus Man (1996)
- Star Trek: Deep Space Nine (1998)
- Animorphs (1998)
- Sliders (1998-1999)
- The Mummy (2001)
- Liberty's Kids (2002)
- Star Trek: New Voyages (2007)
