= John Winston (actor) =

English actor (1927–2019)

- Born: 24 October 1927; Leeds, West Riding of Yorkshire, England
- Died: 19 September 2019 (aged 91); Los Angeles, California, U.S.
- Occupation: Actor
- Years active: 1966–2004

John Winston (24 October 1927 – 19 September 2019) was an English actor. He was known for his supporting appearances in the original 1960s Star Trek series as "Lieutenant Kyle", who served variously as transporter operator or bridge officer, which he reprised – promoted to the rank of commander – for a minor role in the 1982 motion picture Star Trek II: The Wrath of Khan.

== Filmography ==
- The Man from U.N.C.L.E. (1966, TV Series) – U.N.C.L.E. Agent
- Twelve O'Clock High (1966, TV Series) – British Co-Pilot
- The Time Tunnel (1966, TV Series) – British Sentry (uncredited) / The Guard
- Star Trek (1966–69, TV Series) – Lt. Kyle / Transporter Chief / Transporter Technician
- Sole Survivor (1970, TV Movie) – British Pilot
- Assault on the Wayne (1971, TV Movie) – English Scientist
- California Split (1974) – Tenor
- Charlie's Angels (1978, TV Series) – Hotel Clerk
- Star Trek II: The Wrath of Khan (1982) – Commander Kyle
- The Fall Guy (1982, TV Series) – Manager
- Max Headroom (1987, TV Series) – Plantaganet
- Lucky/Chances ... (1990, TV Series) – Smythson
- Star Trek: New Voyages (2004, online TV Series) – Captain Matthew Jefferies (final role)
