= James Cawley =

American film producer and actor

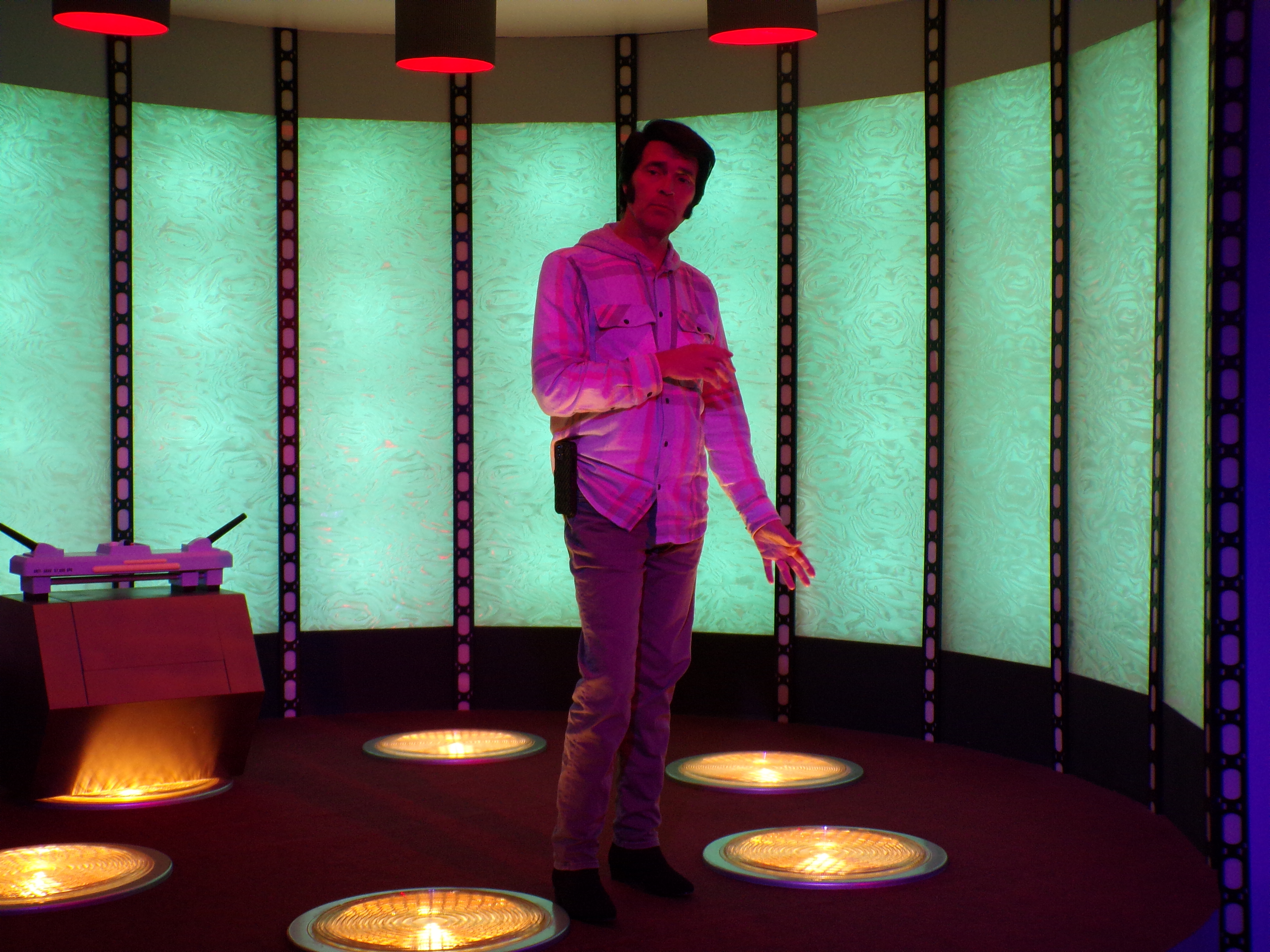
- Cawley in 2023
- Born: James Cawley II; June 23, 1967 (age 59); Ticonderoga, New York, U.S.
- Years active: 2004—present

James Cawley (born June 23, 1967) is an American executive film producer and actor, known for his portrayal of Captain James T. Kirk in the fan film series Star Trek: New Voyages.

== Star Trek: New Voyages ==
A big Star Trek fan growing up, Cawley, at age 17, contacted Bill Theiss, the head costume designer for the original Star Trek series (ST:TOS) for advice on making his own Captain Kirk costume. The two became friends and this led to Theiss hiring him as an intern in the costume department of Star Trek: The Next Generation (ST:TNG). Theiss left ST: TNG after the first season and Cawley subsequently left the show to pursue a career as an Elvis impersonator, but he never lost his love for the Star Trek franchise.

After Theiss died in 1992, Cawley received a package in the mail from his estate with complete sets of blueprints for the sets of both ST: TOS and ST: TNG. Using money earned from his career performing as Elvis, Cawley began building some of the ST: TOS sets in a former car dealership in Port Henry, New York and then he and a group of Star Trek fans began filming fan episodes based on ST: TOS, which became Star Trek: New Voyages.

Cawley and the New Voyages cast and crew shot and released eleven episodes of the show online, but then discontinued the series when Paramount introduced stricter rules about fan productions. Cawley then moved the sets to a former dollar store in Ticonderoga, NY, his home town, completed building the remaining ST: TOS sets and in July 2016 opened the set to tours by the public.

== Other projects ==
Cawley’s prominent role in Star Trek: New Voyages gave him the opportunity to play small roles in a few other Star Trek fan episodes. He portrayed Mackenzie Calhoun in the 41st Star Trek: Hidden Frontier episode Vigil, and had a cameo as Captain Kirk along with ‘’New Voyages’’ co-stars Jeff Quinn and John Kelley in the premiere episode of Starship Farragut titled The Captaincy.

The starship Ticonderoga in the Star Trek: Enterprise episode "The Aenar" was named as a nod to Cawley's hometown. His sets, props and costumes have also been used by Star Trek: Enterprise in the episode "In a Mirror, Darkly" and in the fan film Of Gods and Men in which Cawley also plays one of Captain Kirk's nephews. In addition to producing more episodes of Phase II, Cawley appeared in the cameo role of a bridge officer in the 2009 Star Trek movie.

In 2009, Cawley and his production company, Retro Film Studios, secured the license to Buck Rogers, which began filming in late 2009, with planned to offer episodes online in 2010. However, as of 2025, no episodes have been produced or released. Cawley is also developing a continuation of the cult spy/western series The Wild Wild West.
