= Dark Place =

Dark Place or darkplace may refer to:

- Garth Marenghi's Darkplace, a 2004 British horror parody television series
- Dark Place (film), a 2019 Australian horror anthology film
- "Dark Place", a track from Deltarune Chapters 3+4 (Original Game Soundtrack)

== See also ==
- Dark Places (disambiguation)
- A Dark Place, a 2019 British-American mystery thriller film
- In a Dark Place, a 2006 horror film version of Henry James' 1898 novella The Turn of the Screw
- The Dark Place, a 2014 mystery-thriller film
