= Watercolors (film) =

- Theatrical release poster
- Directed by: David Oliveras
- Written by: David Oliveras
- Produced by: Larry Allen; Penny Styles McLean
- Starring: Tye Olson; Kyle Clare; Greg Louganis; Karen Black
- Edited by: Martinos Aristidou
- Music by: Dorian Rimsin, Marcelo Cesena
- Release date: June 7, 2008 (Swansea Bay Film Festival)
- Running time: 105 minutes
- Country: United States
- Language: English
- Box office: $6,305

Watercolors is a 2008 American film directed by David Oliveras and starring Tye Olson, Kyle Clare, Greg Louganis and Karen Black. It was produced by Larry Allen and Penny Styles McLean. The script was written by Oliveras.

== Plot ==
Shy, closeted and nerdy young artist Danny (Tye Olson) is befriended by golden boy swimming champion Carter (Kyle Clare) when family circumstances bring them together for a night. Danny helps the troubled Carter in school, while the brash and sexy yet troubled Carter works hard to hide his drug problems, history of seizures and the painful relationship he has with his unsympathetic, recovering alcoholic father. Their blossoming relationship brings Danny out of his shell, awakening both his passion for art and burgeoning gay sexuality.

Watercolors is framed by scenes of Danny as an adult. He's a successful artist, but his boyfriend is bothered that he can't seem to get over his high school first love. He argues that a live person can't compete with a glorified memory, showing that the lasting memory of a first love is potentially toxic.

== Cast ==
- Tye Olson as Danny Wheeler
- Kyle Clare as Carter Melman
- Ellie Araiza as Andy
- Greg Louganis as Coach Brown
- Karen Black as Mrs. Martin
- Casey Kramer as Miriam
- William Charles Mitchell as Mr. Frank
- Ian Rhodes as Older Danny
- Edward Finlay as Allan
- David Schroeder as High School Principal
- Bobby Quinn Rice as Donnert

== Screenings and awards ==
- 2008 Outfest in Los Angeles winning Audience Award-winning:

Audience Award - "Outstanding First Dramatic Feature" for "Watercolors" Jury Award - "Best Actor" for Tye Olson

- 2008 Tampa International Gay and Lesbian Film Festival winning:
  - Jury Award - "Best Actor" for Tye Olson
  - Audience Award - "Best Supporting Actor" for Kyle Clare
  - Audience Award - "Best Director" for David Oliveras

New York Times critic Neil Genzlinger reviewed the movie was being "modest" and deals "unblinkingly with gay bashing among high school students..."

Screenings

- The film was also shown in the 2008 San Francisco Frameline Film Festival
