= Spring (TV series) =

- Country of origin: Belgium
- Original language: Dutch
- No. of seasons: 6
- No. of episodes: 390

Original release
- Network: Ketnet
- Release: December 2, 2002 – March 28, 2008

Spring was a Flemish television soap made by Studio 100 for children's channel Ketnet. Six seasons were taped between 2002 and 2007 during the summer period. By popular demand the series was regularly rerun from 2011 onwards.

== Storylines ==
The storylines are about a group of young people finding themselves and the scene revolving around dance school Spring. The girls share an interest in dancing, fashion and photography. The boys are passionate about music. Love, friendship and competition are recurring themes, but in the end friendship conquers all.

=== Season 1 ===
- Spring is the dance school run by Maggy Lejeune; she teaches circa ten girls including Katrijn Van Asten, newcomer Chantal Goegebuer and Evi De Bie. They participate in a dance contest where Katrijn and Chantal compete as soloists.
- Spring is also the place where the band of the same name practises. The four original members are Evert Van Bellum (guitar), Pieter Van Asten (bass), Thomas Desmyter (drums) and Xavier Lejeune (keyboards), Maggy's wisecracking brother. Xavier appears to be unreliable and gets thrown out of the band on Evert's insistence. Xavier gets replaced by Evert's cousin Jonas who is also a successful DJ.
- Things go wrong when Katrijn meets her "dreamboy", Arne whom she starts a relationship with. Evert gets dismayed because he has a secret crush on Katrijn. Arne appears to be a drug dealer with cruel intentions; Jonas becomes one of his clients, thinking that pills are the solution to cope with his busy schedule.
- To make matters worse, Jonas nearly breaks up the band because he starts dating Thomas' ex-girlfriend Evi. Thomas reveals all when he announces his departure on radio. All ends well, Arne is banned from Spring, Thomas rejoins the band in time for their record contract, and the girls win the contest on account of a dual solo by Katrijn and Chantal.

=== Season 2 ===
- Pieter has a shortlived relationship with Chantal while a notorious spray painter comes to town. Jonas and Thomas have left Spring; the former has moved to Ibiza to continue his DJ career, while the latter has commitments at his father's garage. Their replacements are, respectively, keyboard player Tina "Tien" Smolders, and drummer/policeman David Vercauteren. David soon gets romantically involved with Katrijn; Evert is disheartened again but wishes them the best. The band also find a new manager (Luc) who might arrange them a deal to record a CD and shoot a music video.
- The girls audition for a music video by the popular band Fusion. Evi hopes to become the soloist after a year of hard work.
- Xavier and his mate Axel Dewinne have formed the band Woefer. They share their manager with Spring, but the problem is that Luc and the record company only have budget for one band. Spring compete with Woefer and add a female vocalist to the lineup; they choose Evi over Chantal and Katrijn.
- After her split from Pieter, Chantal goes on a rebound pretending to be in love with Axel. She joins Woefer, but leaves as soon as it transpires that the lyrics for their first song are stolen from Spring. Chantal gets in a depression because Evi and Katrijn are singled out as this year's soloists while Pieter is now dating Tien.
- Maggy jumps at the chance to dance in Paris; Laura is introduced as her stand-in but appears to be working for Marie-France, Chantal's mother. She is paid to persuade Katrijn to give up dancing and put Chantal forward as the new soloist. Maggy returns in time to prevent this scheme.
- Meanwhile, Xavier and Abel find out that Tien is the spray painter; they threaten to go the police unless Spring offer their latest song to Woefer. Spring make the right decision by going to the police themselves; Axel gets arrested because he did not pay his traffic fines while Woefer ends before it has even begun. The manager has good news for Spring; he grants them the opportunity to record a CD and shoot a music video. The girls have passed the audition and dance in Fusion's new video.

=== Season 3 ===
- Everyone is busy pursuing their own projects; Evi cuts off her dreadlocks and retires from dancing to study Eastern philosophy in London, Maggy spends a few days in Paris, Katrijn wants to be a professional dancer while Evert wants to continue as a singer-songwriter. Pieter signs up for motorcycling races, and Tien is taking driving lessons. Their individual dreams seem to fall apart when Katrijn's father, policeman Roger, brings them the sad news that Maggy died in a car accident on the way home. After Maggy's cremation, everyone agrees that she had wanted them to follow their dreams.
- Xavier inherits money from Maggy; he buys himself a new guitar and an amplifier, and auditions for the popular death metal band Black Slash. He passes but has to apply a tattoo in order to obtain full membership, something that is not his cup of tea. Xavier soon falls in love with new girl Roxanne Boisier who shares his dislike of tattoos. He happily decides against joining Black Slash.
- Manager Luc tells Spring that he arranged a venue for the recording of their anniversary concert. Roxanne is a great dancer and gets the chance to prove that on television.
- A tropical party is held at Spring; Xavier and Roxanne amaze everyone by kissing each other. The party gets spoiled by a notary who announces that Spring will be sold.
- Another thing that worries the girls and boys of Spring is the return of Arne. He has an appointment with Katrijn at the basketball court. Arne tells that he has changed his ways and that he only has good intentions; Roger confirms this. Xavier wants to take Roxanne to Thailand and buys scratch cards in order to win the money for the trip. At the auction, Spring is temporarily sold to Marie-France, but she wants to convert it into a photo studio. Xavier wins the lottery, but uses the money to buy Spring; by joining forces with new dance teacher Pia, he is able to outbid Marie-France and continue his sister's dream.
- The manager has taken Spring's music to London in an attempt to launch their career in the United Kingdom. All remains quiet till Evert hears an English version of Spring's theme song on the radio; he realises that Luc has sold their music.
- Pieter leaves the band to become a test driver in Australia, and thus travel the world. He finds a replacement in Jo De Klein, a painting artist by day, and gets treated to a farewell party.
- Chantal's expatriate father Christian pays a visit to Belgium; he asks his daughter to go back with him to Canada. Chantal has doubts about the idea and prefers to stay in Belgium, which her father fully understands.
- A film director wants to tape a docusoap about Spring; Pia thinks it is a good idea because it also serves as free publicity for her dance school. Jo gets the band a new manager who seems to be more interested in Evert than in the whole band. Evert gets persuaded to go solo, but ultimately turns down the offer and chooses to stay with Spring. Roxanne competes with Katrijn for the solo spot; she loses and gets jealous.
- Luc Cortens returns to Spring in an attempt to cut a deal with Xavier; he pays him a large sum of money in return for Spring's latest. Xavier is not to be bribed and calls the police to arrest Luc.
- Jo gets evicted from his apartment; Arlette, Katrijn's mother, suggests that he moves in at Pieter's bedroom. Spring finally manage to get a venue for their anniversary concert; Pieter briefly returns for a surprise appearance with the band.

=== Season 4 ===
- Katrijn passes her first year at the ballet academy; everyone congratulates her except Rpxanne who is still bitter that she was not chosen as the face of Spring. Katrijn considers to quit dancing because there are too many egos involved and not enough friends. After some heavy arguments with her father Roger she moves in with Jo and starts drinking. By the time she comes to her senses, it is time to go home and make up.
- Jo's place seems to become a refuge for Van Astens; Roger spends some time with him, being disgusted at David's traineeship and Arlette's new job as an ombudsman. Roger is told to leave after letting Jo's pet spider Marie go; Marie returns but soon dies. Roger apologises for his behaviour and compensates Jo by giving him a snake. Meanwhile, Jo gets confronted with his ex-boyfriend Ben who walked out on him a few years ago. For Xavier, who takes painting lessons from Ben, it comes as a surprise that Jo is gay.
- Pia is on holiday; Xavier stages extra courses to earn more money for Spring but fails to paint the office as he was told to do in the first place. After Pia returns she gets a surprise visit from her father who owns the local theater casts a critical eye on his daughter's efforts. Pia is challenged to prepare the girls for a performance of Swan Lake at her father's theater, but she wants to make dancing fun again and asks the band to score the music. Pia is fully aware that her father would not accept this and asks everyone to keep him in the dark.
- Xavier and his father Francois, who runs the newsagent store, start their own pizza business and become fierce competition for Pizza Carlo where Evert works as a delivery boy. A pizza war ensues, and Evert loses himself; he gets in trouble with the police but fails to fully recover his spirits and plants a smelly inflammable subject at Pizza Francois. The place burns down and Evert gets arrested by David, now a chief inspector, and colleague Karima in whom Evert is mutually interested. He gets released after Francois confesses that it was an insurance fraud to make up for the money lost.
- Meanwhile, Katrijn thinks that she is losing David; she stops eating and faints while visiting David and Karima on the work floor. According to the doctor she was close to getting anorexia. Katrijn ultimately decides to study photography.
- Chantal's father Christian comes to Belgium with business partner Roland and his son Bas. Chantal is initially unimpressed with Bas' geeky image but soon they get a relationship. Christian is voted Canadian businessman of the year, but there is little time to celebrate because the bridge that was built under his supervision has collapsed. Christian is held responsible and gets arrested to euphoric coverage in the Belgian press. Bas thinks that he did it which means the end of his relationship with Chantal. David finds evidence against Roland and arrests him; Roland confesses after hours of being questioned. Christian gets released and flies back to Canada; joined by Bas.
- Roxanne breaks up with Xavier and sings up for Marie-France's model-agency. She joins Tien on a trip to Milan for a photo-shoot. Upon arrival, Tien and Roxanne gets some concerning phonecalls; Pia considers to cancel the Swan Lake-project because nobody seems to be interested in doing it. They abandon the shoot and return to Belgium. Marie-France is very angry with Pia and threatens to take her to court.
- Christian permanently returns to Belgium and becomes a couple with Marie-France again.
- After weeks of practise, Spring finally perform Swan Lake. Pia's father likes it but is in for a surprise halfway; the band play a greatest hits medley Xavier making a guest appearance. Everyone has enjoyed the performance, including the Minister of Culture who grants the theater a financial boost.

=== Season 5 ===
- Katrijn becomes the last of the original dancers to leave. She turns down David's proposal because she has accepted a once-in-a-lifetime offer to study in the United States. Roxanne thinks that the departure of Katrijn, who dismissed her as a "selfish girl", paves the way for an audition for Dans Mondial. She gets no permission because she is teaching dance classes at Power.com. This internet company, run by Stefanie (more or less the next Marie-France), also sponsors Everts's station Radio Spring. Evert receives text messages from a faithful listener and wants to meet her, at the expense of his relationship with Karima. Evert gets disappointed when he comes face to face with Rita.
- Two new dancing girls are introduced; Pia's niece Leen and Nele who initially pretends to have rich parents. Spring also welcomes its first male dancer; Steven. Xavier assumes that Steven is gay and does not want to know him; he gets a change of heart after being taken for a demonstration flight. Apart from a great aviator, Steven is also an anti-fur activist.
- Tien has a relationship with Niek, the same guy who drove her into hospital because she did not pay attention when she crossed the road. Because Tien failed to keep her promise to stay away from computer games she has to dye her hair green.
- Roger reunites with his daughter from a previous relationship; Emma bears a striking resemblance to Katrijn and is an old friend of Karima.
- Roger donates skateboards to street kids and wants to bake waffles to raise funds. When he is taken to hospital with a heart attack, the girls and boys from Spring step in. It becomes a success, but no thanks to Roxanne and her claims that eating those greasy waffles will cause diarrhea. Roger and Arlette renew their wedding vows; Katrijn flies in from the US to attend the reception. Spring perform while Xavier also has a surprise in store; a box full of mice.
- Radio Spring stages a singing contest; Evert breaks the rules by competing himself with the intention to win it. He openly disrespects his fellow competitors, particularly a mysterious country singer who appears to be Jo in disguise. Evert and Jo make it to the final round, but thanks to blind technician Stijn the listeners vote for Emma.
- Pia asks the girls to dance as clowns for the Society Club, but nobody's interested. When it transpires that Pia is offered another job, they decide to do the job after all hoping that Pia will change her mind. The clowns act becomes a success and Pia says that she has no intention of leaving; the letters is from an old student.
- Xavier falls in love with French dancer Celine; he does not speak the language, but David helps him by telling him the right sentences through an ear-microphone. Things go well till Evert decides to stage a prank. Xavier uses a Dutch-to-French dictionary to write Celine an apologetic letter; Celine has gone back to Paris, but she receives the letter and answers Xavier positively.
- The girls audition for an online-commercial for Power.com., but lose out to Roxanne. It appears to be a dog food commercial.
- Karima faces racist bullying and wants to flee the country; she does not need actions from Spring (a march against intolerance and a phone-in marathon), but Roger ultimately persuades her to stay. Singer Brahim joins forces with Spring to record an anti-racism track.

=== Season 6 ===
- Spring continues with no original members; Evert left the band after his lovesong got rejected. Jo and Niek take his role over, but lack any songwriting abilities. Evert offers them a helping hand till record executive Jean Carbonez asks him for a series of workshops, meaning that he is unavailable for a long time.
- Tien stays in Spain following an argument with Niek; she found a job at a garage and fell in love with somebody else.
- Pia went to America as a stand-in dancer. Stephanie takes care of the financial chaos and wants to make Spring a professional dance-school. Her motives do not make sense; she is recruiting an inexperienced male dance teacher and announces a performance as quickly as she cancels it. Juan is willing to do teaching experience, but Stefanie needs money to pay him and does so by increasing the rates for bicycle parking and compulsory drinks.
- Emma takes boxing lessons from Jo and proves that she is very talented. Jo takes her to the kick boxing club and introduces her to teacher Koen. Jo fancies Koen but he already has a boyfriend.
- An absent minded man comes to Spring; he appears to be David's grandfather. Magic Ferdinand lost his job at the circus because he has Alzheimer's, which is hard for him to accept. He gets permission for one last performance, but dies soon afterwards. It is decided to pay tribute to Ferdinand.
- Spring try to save the local animal shelter from getting demolished and replaced by apartments. They waste no effort because the owner, Niek's father, refuses to give in. Nele and Leen meet Luc, a student who works at the company en later gets a relationship with Nele. They ultimately stage a fundraiser at the circus to preserve the shelter, and Niek's father is one of the many people who donate. Evert briefly rejoins Spring, dressed as a clown. Pia returns from the States; she has made enough money to make up the numbers.

== Topstars; Dutch remake ==
Click here for main article.

== Later developments ==
- Jelle Cleymans (Evert) played the starring role in a stage-adaptation of The Adventures of Tintin Prisoners of the Sun during the last Spring-season. He also appeared in the Thuis-soap series.
- Kobe Van Herwegen (David) became a Ketnet-presenter (Ketnet-wrapper) which gave him the opportunity to express his magician-skills.
- Veronique Leysen (Roxanne) went on to play in the amazone-themed Studio 100 production Amika; Marie-Claire, ringleader of the three-piece Z-Girls, was basically a continuation of Roxanne. Leysen had also been a Ketner-wrapper.
- Timo Descamps (Jo) played a South African emigre in Dutch school-series Spangas and had a role in the US movie Judas Kiss.
