= David Oliveras =

American director

David Oliveras is an American director who won "Best Director" award at the Tampa International Gay and Lesbian Film Festival and "Outstanding First Dramatic Feature" at the Los Angeles Outfest for his 2008 debut feature film Watercolors. The script of the film was also written by Oliveras.

The film also won "Best Gay Film" and the "Audience Choice Award" at QCinema: Ft. Worth Gay & Lesbian Film Festival in 2009.

His 2006 4-minute music video "FantasyLand," by Springgroove was shot in Venice Beach, Los Angeles and was featured at "The Other Vencice Film Festival."

== Screenings and awards ==
- David Oliveras won the Audience Award for "Outstanding First Dramatic Feature" for "Watercolors" at the 2008 Outfest in Los Angeles. The jury also awarded "Best Actor" to Tye Olson, lead actor in the movie.
- David Oliveras also won the Audience Award for "Best Director" for the movie at the 2008 Tampa International Gay and Lesbian Film Festival. Jury also awarded "Best Actor" award for the leading Tye Olson and "Best Supporting Actor" for Kyle Clare.
