= Turkey Hollow =

2015 television film directed by Kirk Thatcher

- Television release poster
- Screenplay by: Tim Burns; Christopher Baldi
- Story by: Jim Henson; Jerry Juhl; Kirk R. Thatcher
- Directed by: Kirk R. Thatcher
- Starring: Mary Steenburgen; Jay Harrington; Graham Verchere; Genevieve Buechner; Reese Alexander; Gabe Khouth; Peter New; Linden Banks
- Narrated by: Ludacris
- Music by: Mick Giacchino
- Countries of origin: United States; Canada
- Original language: English

Production
- Producers: Ritamarie Peruggi; Harvey Kahn
- Cinematography: Randal Platt
- Editor: Richard Schwadel
- Running time: 88 minutes
- Production company: The Jim Henson Company

Original release
- Network: Lifetime
- Release: November 21, 2015

Jim Henson's Turkey Hollow is a 2015 Thanksgiving television film created by The Jim Henson Company and aired on Lifetime on November 21, 2015. The film is directed by Kirk R. Thatcher, adapted by Tim Burns and Christopher Baldi from a story by Jim Henson, Jerry Juhl, and Kirk Thatcher, narrated by Ludacris, and starring Mary Steenburgen, Jay Harrington, Graham Verchere, Genevieve Buechner, Reese Alexander, Gabe Khouth, Peter New, and Linden Banks. The television film was met with mixed reviews.

== Plot ==
As part of the Thanksgiving holidays, a recently divorced man named Ron Emmerson (Jay Harrington) takes his children Tim (Graham Verchere) and Annie (Genevieve Buechner) to the farm of Ron's eccentric Aunt Cly (Mary Steenburgen) in the town of Turkey Hollow, which has no modern technology. Tim and Annie find themselves caught up in searching for the "Howling Hoodoo," an elusive 10 ft. monster that has been considered a legend to the citizens of Turkey Hollow while also coming across the plot of the scheming neighbor Eldridge Slump (Linden Banks) and his farmworker minions Buzz (Gabe Khouth) and Junior (Peter New) that involves illegal turkeys activities and a plot for Eldridge to claim Aunt Cly's farm. With the aid of some new creature friends named Squonk, Zorp, Burble, and Thring, the Emmersons must expose Slump's plot and save the day.

== Cast ==
- Mary Steenburgen – Aunt Cly
- Jay Harrington – Ron Emmerson
- Genevieve Buechner – Annie Emmerson
- Graham Verchere – Tim Emmerson
- Ludacris – Narrator
- Reese Alexander – Sheriff Grover
- Linden Banks – Eldridge Slump
- Gabe Khouth - Buzz
- Peter New - Junior
- Elliot Mandelcorn - Lawyer
- Kathryn Kirkpatrick - Shopkeeper

=== Note ===
Kirk Thatcher cameos in a photo as Uncle Ned.

=== Puppeteers ===
- Alice Dinnean – Squonk
- Jason Hopley – Zorp
- Rob Mills – Burble
- Gord Robertson – Thrinng

==== Additional Puppeteers ====
- Jeny Cassady
- Morris Chapdelaine
- Kellie Haines
- Paul Hooson
- Geoff Redknap
- James Rowley

== Production ==
Turkey Hollow started out as a story called "The Musical Monsters of Turkey Hollow" which was written by Jerry Juhl as one of Jim Henson's proposed specials. The original production phase of "The Musical Monsters of Turkey Hollow" made it as far as puppet design where some of them were built and still exist in the archives. Photos of Lisa Henson and Cheryl Henson were taken in Jim Henson's backyard as a test to see how the puppets would look in the real world outside of a sound stage. The intention was to shoot the special on location. In 2014, "The Musical Monsters of Turkey Hollow" was adapted into a graphic novel.

When Turkey Hollow went into production, the original puppets in storage were refurbished by Jim Henson's Creature Shop with their designs updated by Robert Bennett (the winner of Jim Henson's Creature Shop Challenge) and Peter Brooke, the fabrication done by Julie Zobel, and the animatronics provided by John Criswell as seen in the Google+ Hangout tour. Principal photography was set to begin in the spring of 2015 in Nova Scotia, Canada. Because of a new tax credit, production on the special moved to Front Street Pictures in Vancouver where filming began on June 8, 2015.

== Release ==
Turkey Hollow was later released on Disney+ on February 10, 2023.

== Reception ==
It has a score of 50 out of 100 on Metacritic based on 5 critics, indicating "mixed or average reviews" and 67% on Rotten Tomatoes based on 6 reviews with an average rating of 6.1/10. Variety awarded it a mildly positive review, saying "this Lifetime movie turns into a passable family adventure, showcasing the Henson Co.'s trademark creature designs while inoffensively building a new holiday-friendly legend around them." The Hollywood Reporter awarded it a mixed review, and was particularly critical of the lack of screen time for the puppets, saying "However, if you want to watch two amiable but unremarkable child actors meander Muppet-less through the woods while their father does paperwork and Ludacris reads cue cards in a shawl-collar sweater I can only describe as glorious, you may have found a new Thanksgiving tradition." Collider awarded it three of out five stars, saying "Mostly though, Turkey Hollow is just fine. It's family-friendly and has enough humor and delight to potentially appeal to anyone gathered around the TV over Thanksgiving. The cast is cute and likeable, and a romantic subplot for the older set is a unique change of pace." The A.V. Club also awarded it a mixed review, saying "The film isn’t going to improve the reputation of the Thanksgiving TV special, but it's definitely something that can play in the background of a family gathering, piquing someone's interest every 20 minutes or so." The Los Angeles Times gave it a positive review, writing "Overall, this is smart, solid whole-family entertainment, modest in its ambitions yet far above the run of made-for-TV holiday yuck you will be offered in the weeks ahead." The film's premiere drew 1.6 million viewers and a 0.39 demo share.
