= Bobby Rice =

American actor (born 1983)

- Born: Robert Quinn Rice; March 14, 1983 (age 43); Colorado, U.S.
- Occupation: Actor
- Years active: 2006—present

Bobby Rice (also known as Bobby Quinn Rice; born Robert Quinn Rice; March 14, 1983) is an American actor, known for The Lair (2007), Watercolors (2008), Remains (2011), LAIFF Award winning short film Spidora (2014), the role of Peter Kirk in the Star Trek: New Voyages two-part episode Blood and Fire (2009) based on the Star Trek: The Next Generation episode of the same name, as well as several minor roles in other Star Trek fan productions.

== Filmography ==
| Year | Title | Role | Notes |
|---|---|---|---|
| 2007 | Star Trek: Hidden Frontier | Lt. Ro Nevin | TV series short, Episodes Past Sins, Bound, Things Fall Apart, Hearts and Minds, The Widening Gyre, The Center Cannot Hold, Its Hour Come Round at Last |
| 2007 | MANswers | Couch friend | TV series, episode 1.1 |
| 2007 | Star Trek: Odyssey | Lt. Cdr. Ro Nevin | TV mini-series short, episode Iliad |
| 2007 | Star Trek: Of Gods and Men | G.S.S. Conqueror Klingon / Romulan officer | Video release, first Star Trek fan film to star Nichelle Nicols |
| 2008 | Watercolors | Donnert | Winner of two L.A. Outfest Awards 2008 |
| 2008-2009 | The Lair | Richie | TV series, season 1: 7 episodes, season 2: 10 episodes |
| 2008-2013 | Star Trek: New Voyages / Phase II | Ensign Peter Kirk | TV series, Episodes Blood and Fire (2009), Enemy: Starfleet! (2011), The Child (2012), Going Boldly (2012), Kitumba (2013) |
| 2009 | The Odd Squad Episode 1: Making History | Kid Dad's son | |
| 2011 | Super Shark | Carter | |
| 2011 | Remains | O'Brien | Based on the graphic novel by Steve Niles |
| 2012-2013 | Broken at Love | Darin | TV series, Episodes Dear Mr. Holden Gregory (2012), Evening Session (2012), Players Party (2012), Bashing the Opponent (2013) |
| 2014 | The Soul Man | Jameson | TV series, episode Moving on Up |
| 2014 | Star Trek Continues | Transporter technician | TV series, episode Fairest of Them All |
| 2014 | After Midnight | Julian | |
| 2014 | Spidora | Andrew | Short |
| 2016 | Rachel Dratch's Late Night Snack | Drummer Boy | TV series, Episodes The Second Course, Cornelia Grind |
| 2017 | A Royal Christmas Ball | Paparazzo | TV movie |
| 2019 | Pimpin' Dick | Property Manager | TV mini-series, episode 1.4 |
| 2019 | One Fine Christmas | Rick | TV movie |
| TBA | Nightingale: A Melody of Life | Will Goff | Main character |

== Nominations ==
| Year | Award | Category | Film |
|---|---|---|---|
| 2015 | Los Angeles Independent Film Festival Awards | Best Actor | Spidora |
