= Blaise Godbe Lipman =

American actor

Blaise David Godbe Lipman
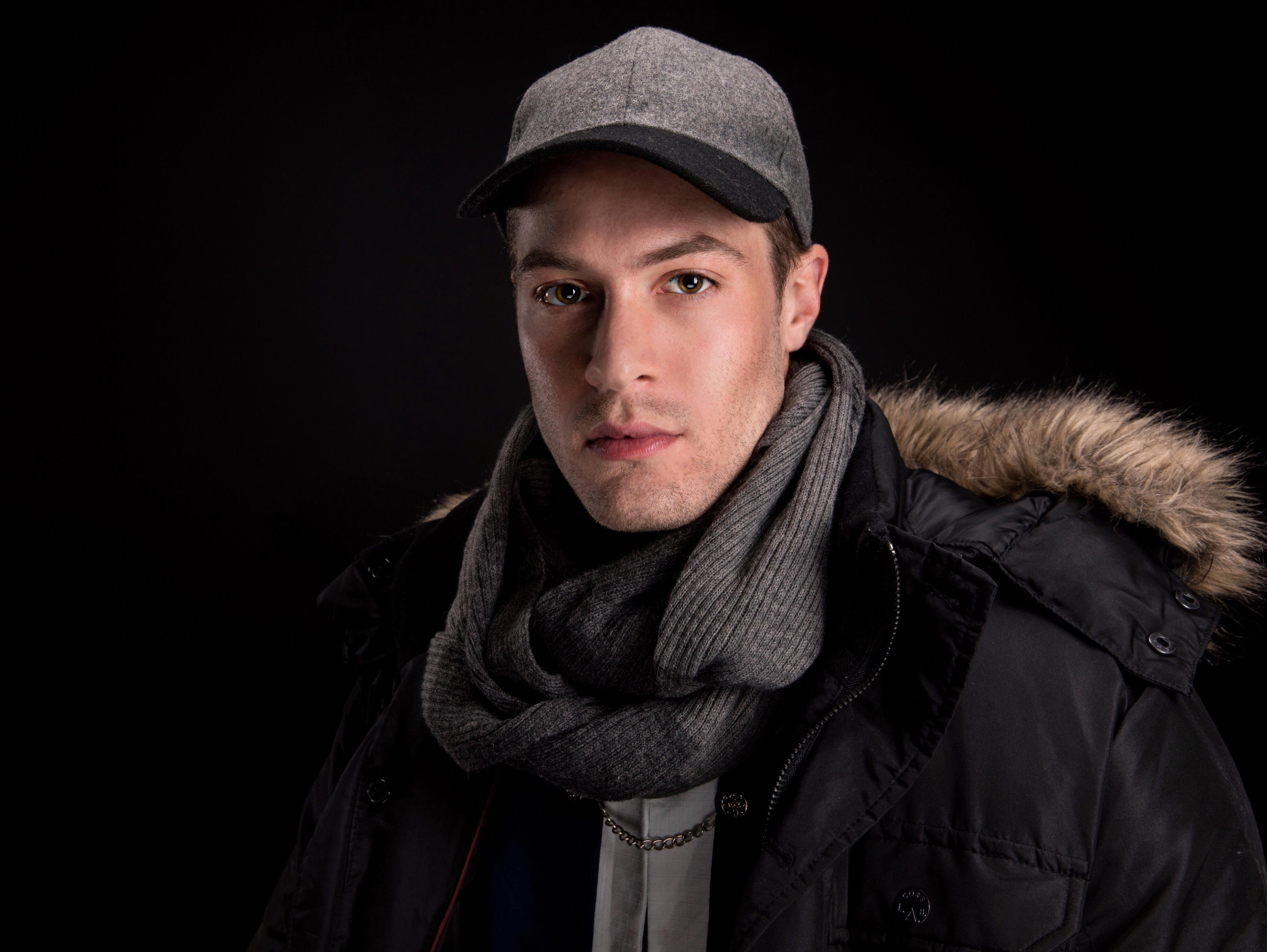
- Filmmaker portrait, 2017 Sundance Film Festival
- Born: 1988 or 1989 (age 36–37); Big Sur, California, U.S.
- Other names: Blaise, Blaise Embry, Blaise Godbe Lipman
- Occupations: actor; director
- Years active: 2004–present

Blaise Godbe Lipman (born 1988 or 1989) is an American filmmaker, actor, political commentator, and a Time Person of the Year for his social activism regarding sexual abuse in the American film industry.

== Early life ==
Lipman was born in 1988 and 1989 and raised in rural Big Sur, California.

== Career ==
A few months after moving to Hollywood, Lipman was cast as Brett Bailey on the fourth season of NBC's The Office. He subsequently made a name for himself as a teen actor on TV shows Weeds, CSI: NY, Hawaii Five-0, as well as Disney shows Suite Life on Deck and Pair of Kings. Lipman's film work includes acclaimed dramas Nobody Walks (Magnolia Pictures, Sundance 2012) and The Amateur (Tar & Feather, Dances with Films, 2015) for which he also served as co-producer; the lead role of Keegan Dark, in The Dark Place, an acclaimed thriller for which Lipman won a best actor award at South by SouthWest Film Festival, and the series regular role of Jared Fostmeyer on the lifetime series Betrayed at 17.

Lipman has written and directed short films that have played and won festivals internationally, including Best Film at the UK Film Festival, Best Short at the London Film Festival, the New Directors/New Films Festival, the Carmel International Film Festival, Cinema Jam, Toronto International Film Festival, SXSW, NewFilmmakers NY, and Big Sur International.

In 2016, Lipman was named a Film Independent Fellow and was invited to participate in the Director's Lab, supported by the Time Warner Foundation and the National Endowment for the Arts. He has also worked with James Ponsoldt on his debut feature film In the Shadows of the Rainbow.

Lipman has collaborated extensively with Ryan Murphy after being selected as part of his Half Foundation in 2017. He took part in the direction of Murphy's The Assassination of Gianni Versace: American Crime Story.

Lipman's visual curation and installation work has been featured at the MOMA, MOCA in Los Angeles, and the Institute of Contemporary Arts in London.

== Personal life ==
Lipman initially was professionally known as Blaise Embry, a surname his first agents recommended because they thought God in "Godbe" might be polarizing and Lipman too ethnic. He later returned to his given name upon becoming a filmmaker. In October 2017, Lipman contributed to the launch of the MeToo movement when he came forward publicly about abuse suffered in the industry as a young actor, offering a platform to survivors of sexual assault. Lipman was the first to give a voice to male victims of sexual assault, who have traditionally been stigmatized. He was named one of Time magazine's People of the Year in 2017 for his work in the movement, alongside celebrities Taylor Swift, Ashley Judd and Alyssa Milano, as well as fellow lesser-known activists Susan Fowler and Adama Iwu.

Lipman, who is gay, stated that sexual violence by agents on gay actors makes the victims more susceptible because, in some cases, coming out could harm an actor's career. He added that abusers exploit this fact to make the victim keep silent.
