= I'm a Stripper =

- Release poster
- Genre: Reality Television
- Written by: Charlie David
- Directed by: Charlie David
- Country of origin: Canada
- Original language: English

Production
- Producers: Nickolaos Stagias; Border2Border Entertainment
- Cinematography: Steve Hagen and Dany Papineau (stills); Nickolaos Stagias
- Editors: Mark Dejczak, Janak Subramanian
- Running time: 3 hours 44 minutes

Original release
- Release: April 3, 2013 – 2013

I'm a Stripper is a 5 part TV documentary mini-series written and directed by Charlie David, and produced by Nickolaos Stagias with David's own Border2Border Entertainment Inc. The show follows the lives of a number of male strippers from various backgrounds in a number of locations in United States and Canada. The full title I'm a Stripper: The Real Life Magic Men refers to the popularity of Steven Soderbergh's film Magic Mike starring Channing Tatum.

The series was launched on 3 April 2013, and has been featured in American Logo for its 'WHAT!?' documentary series features and on Canadian OUTtv specialized stations.

== Synopsis ==
The series features a group of friend strippers in Niagara Falls region, a young Asian man stripping in Montreal, and the performers in a Las Vegas show called Thunder from Down Under. The strippers talk about money, sexual attraction, rivalry on stage, creativity, differences between male and female spectators, personal lives, a typical day on the club floor and away from it, reactions of families and friends.

A number of entertainment experts and psychologists offer their opinions about the profession including Morris Chapdelaine, Scott Bolton and Laurie Betito.

== Cast ==
A number of strippers are featured. The main characters are:

- Alexander Biffin
- Blake McIver Ewing
- Brendan Coates
- Brent Everett
- Brent Ray Fraser
- Clint Scott
- Gabriel Clark
- Jeremy Smith
- Joshua Barilko
- Laurie Betito
- Morris Chapdelaine
- Scott Bolton
- Shazad Hai
- Steve Pena
- Suntory Awiskar

== Episodes ==
Season	Episode	Title	Run Time
1	1	I'm a Stripper	42:34
1	2	I'm a Stripper too!	42:41
1	3	Boylesque	41:40
1	4	America's Most Wanted	46:04
1	5	Digital Dancer	50:59

=== Episode 1 ===
Follows 3 male strippers from the North American cities of Montreal, Niagara Falls and Las Vegas. From a group of friends trying to make a living in Niagara, to an Asian man fighting conservative stereotypes, to Las Vegas, the city of sin. The documentary gives an in depth look into the industry and offers a unique view on how society has accepted male strippers, the dangers of stripping, expectations and why men would want to become strippers.

=== Episode 2 ===
Follows Gabriel's life as a stripper in an open relationship with his fiancé and reveals his dad, Lucas' secrets. Meanwhile, Bronco keeps up with having 3 part-time jobs while stripping and faces criticism as his 30th birthday approaches.

=== Episode 3 ===
Follows Canada's first all male burlesque group in the city of Toronto. The group consists of diverse men from various ethnicities and sexualities.

=== Episode 4 ===
Follows male strippers from the Bronx, Baltimore and Jamaica. Features a male Go-Go dancing troupe and explores the similarities and differences between Go-Go dancing and stripping. Meanwhile, Shazad, who struggled with his weight and body image for years is now a Muslim bodybuilding stripper.

=== Episode 5 ===
Explores the business of online stripping, with video streaming and credit card tips
