= Genevieve Buechner =

Canadian actress (born 1991)

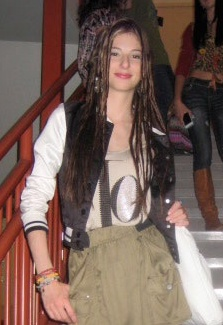
- Genevieve Buechner behind the set of Girl Fight, October 21, 2013
- Born: Genevieve Sterling Buechner; November 10, 1991 (age 34); Edmonton, Alberta, Canada
- Occupation: Actress
- Years active: 2002–present

Genevieve Sterling Buechner (born November 10, 1991) is a Canadian actress. She is known for her television roles such as Tamara Adama on the Syfy series Caprica, Fox on The CW series The 100, and Madison on the Lifetime series UnREAL.

== Early life ==
Genevieve Buechner was born in Edmonton, Alberta, to single mother Tea Buechner. Her stepfather is folk musician Geoff Berner and her half-sister is actress Margot Berner.. When her family moved to Vancouver, she took a small course in acting from the Vancouver Youth Theatre. After completing the course, she went on tour with the youth theater as the youngest member of the cast. She was scouted by Robert Carrier and signed to Carrier Talent Management in Vancouver.

== Career ==
At age ten, Buechner got the lead role in a Toronto film production Saint Monica. The film went on to be a festival success playing across North America and being selected for the Berlin Film Festival, the Atlantic Film Festival, the Toronto Film Festival and the Vancouver Film Festival. She was nominated for a Canadian Leo Award for Best Lead performance by a female in 2003 for that role. In 2005, Buechner played the daughter of Brooke Shields in the Tom Green-led film Bob the Butler. She followed this up in 2007 with a role in the Canadian drama film Mount Pleasant.

Buechner has notable recurring roles on the television series Caprica, The 100, and UnREAL. In 2015, she played the lead role of Annie Emmerson in the Lifetime television film Jim Henson's Turkey Hollow. In 2023, Buechner voiced and provided facial expressions for the character of Ashley Graham in the video game Resident Evil 4.

== Personal life ==
In a 2018 interview with AfterEllen, Buechner revealed that she is bisexual.

== Filmography ==
=== Film ===
Year	Title	Role	Notes
2002	Saint Monica	Monica	
2004	The Final Cut	Isabel Bannister	
2005	Bob the Butler	Tess Jamieson	
2006	Mount Pleasant	Megan Burrows	
2009	Courage	Christy	
2009	Jennifer's Body	Goth Girl #2	
2010	Daydream Nation	Tina	
2011	Judas Kiss	Samantha	
2013	If I Had Wings	Julie	
2014	The Dark Place	Wendy Luckenbill	
2014	If I Stay	Cute Groupie #2	

=== Television ===
Year	Title	Role	Notes
2002	Jeremiah	China	Episode: "Ring of Truth"
2003	Stephen King's Dead Zone	Amy Grantfork	Episode: "Plague"
2003	Devil Winds	Young Kara	TV movie
2004	Family Sins	Young Marie	TV movie
2004	The Love Crimes of Gillian Guess	Carol	TV movie
2004–2005	The 4400	Heidi Moore	4 episodes
2005	Supernatural	Lily Shoemaker	Episode: "Bloody Mary"
2005	Masters of Horror	Young Anna	Episode: "Dance of the Dead"
2006	Saved	Jan Goodman	Episode: "Who Do You Trust?"
2008	Vipers	Maggie Martin	TV movie
2008	Desperate Hours: An Amber Alert	Debra	TV movie
2009	Come Dance at My Wedding	Female Teen Dance Student	TV movie
2009–2010	Caprica	Tamara Adama	Recurring role, 6 episodes
2010	Elopement	Carolyn	TV movie
2010	Bond of Silence	Daisy	TV movie
2010	Fringe	Tabatha	Episode: "Marionette"
2011	R. L. Stine's The Haunting Hour: The Series	Amy Kessler	Episode: "Scarecrow"
2011	The Killing	Mean Girl #1	Episode: "The Cage"
2011	Finding a Family	Lucy	TV movie
2011	Girl Fight	Lauren Kramer	TV movie
2011	Good Morning, Killer	Juliana	TV movie
2011	Heavenly	Paula	TV movie
2012	Emily Owens M.D.	Sophie	Episode: "Emily and... the Outbreak"
2013	One Foot in Hell	Ashley	TV movie
2013	Eve of Destruction	Izzy	TV miniseries
2014	Girlfriends' Guide to Divorce	Whitney - Lyla's assistant	3 episodes
2014–2016	The 100	Fox	Recurring role, 12 episodes
2015–2018	UnREAL	Madison	Recurring role (seasons 1–2); main role (seasons 3–4)
2015	Jim Henson's Turkey Hollow	Annie Emmerson	TV movie
2016	iZombie	Darcy	Episode: "Eternal Sunshine of the Caffeinated Mind"
2018	Supernatural	Samantha Juarez	Episode: "Mint Condition"
2018	The X-Files	Kayla	Episode: "Nothing Lasts Forever"

=== Video games ===
Year	Title	Role	Notes
2023	Resident Evil 4	Ashley Graham	

== Awards ==
Year	Award	Category	Work	Result	Refs
2003	Leo Awards	Feature Length Drama: Best Lead Performance - Female	Monica in Saint Monica	Nominated	
2004	Leo Awards	Short Drama: Best Performance by a Female	Sonia in Princess Castle	Nominated	
2005	Young Artist Award	Best Performance in a TV Movie, Miniseries or Special - Supporting Young Actress	Young Marie in Family Sins	Nominated	
2011	Leo Awards	Dramatic Series: Best Supporting Performance by a Female	Tamara Adama in Caprica episode: "There Is Another Sky"	Nominated	
2014	Leo Awards	Motion Picture: Best Supporting Performance by a Female	Julie in If I Had Wings	Nominated	
