= Dark Places =

Dark Places may refer to:

- Dark Places (Flynn novel), a mystery novel by Gillian Flynn
- Dark Places (Grenville novel), a 1994 novel by Kate Grenville
- Dark Places (1973 film), a 1973 British horror film
- Dark Places (2015 film), a 2015 mystery film, based on the Flynn novel
- "Dark Places" (song), a 2019 song by Beck from his album Hyperspace
- "Dark Places", a song by Hollywood Undead from Day of the Dead

== See also ==
- Dark Place (disambiguation)
- A Dark Place, a 2019 British-American mystery thriller film
- In a Dark Place, a 2006 horror film version of Henry James' 1898 novella The Turn of the Screw
- The Dark Place, a 2014 mystery-thriller film
