= Mulligans (film) =

- Directed by: Chip Hale
- Written by: Charlie David
- Produced by: Charlie David; Linda Carter
- Starring: Dan Payne; Thea Gill; Charlie David; Derek James; Grace Vukovic
- Music by: Ben Sigston; Bob Buckley
- Production company: Border 2 Border Entertainment
- Release date: May 18, 2008 (Inside/Out Toronto)
- Running time: 90 minutes
- Country: Canada
- Language: English

Mulligans is a 2008 gay Canadian romantic drama film written by actor/writer Charlie David and directed by Chip Hale; based on the book of the same name written by Charlie David also. It also stars Dan Payne, Derek James and Thea Gill (of Queer as Folk and Dante's Cove fame).

== Plot ==
Tyler Davidson invites his college buddy Chase home for summer break on Prospect Lake. The Davidson family appears practically perfect in every way to Chase, in contrast to his own dysfunctional family with whom he is not close. After continued attempts by Tyler to set up Chase with local girls, Chase comes out to Tyler and tells him he is gay. The family attempts to support Chase, and Tyler's father, Nathan, in particular, begins to spend substantial time with him. Soon Nathan begins to realize that his own long-suppressed feelings toward men are resurfacing, and he has become attracted to Chase. These attractions turn into a brief affair, which is soon witnessed by Nathan's wife Stacey and later by Tyler. Once in the open, Nathan and Chase try to come to terms with the effect of their actions on others, as the friendship between Tyler and Chase is ruined, and Nathan attempts to keep his family together. Nathan ultimately decides to leave Stacey, Tyler, and their daughter at the family's summer home, while he drives off to re-evaluate his life alone.

== Cast ==
- Charlie David as Chase Rousseau, Tyler's college friend
- Dan Payne as Nathan Davidson, Stacey's closeted husband, Tyler and Birdie's dad
- Thea Gill as Stacey Davidson, Nathan's wife, Tyler and Birdie's mom
- Derek James as Tyler Davidson, Chase's friend, Birdie's older brother
- Grace Vukovic as Birdie Davidson, Tyler's younger sister
- Amy Matysio as Bre Hamilton
- Nhi Do as Christy
- Anthony Joseph as Jarod
- Calum Worthy as Felix
- Patrick Baynham as Razor
- Ann Chaland as Gramma
- Thomas Orr-Loney as Marty
- Maxine English as Bikini Woman
- Ty Didmon as Jeffrey
- Kimberly Clarke as Jackie
- Kenneth Mayes as Jim
- Mckenzie Ryan as Erin
- Andrew Cownden as Anal Andy

== Soundtrack ==
The film contains three original songs by musician Ben Sigston; "Smile", "Waiting Room" and "Turn Around". The alternative rock band Kingsley also provide the song "Rain Down".

== Reception ==
Film critic Don Willmott from Filmcritic.com gave the film a score of 2.5/5, stating: "Writer/star Charlie David may have wanted to keep things low key, but the movie ends up coming across as low voltage".

Michael D. Klemm of Cinemaqueer.com stated that "Mulligans doesn't suck – not by a long shot – but, after a promising start, it winds up overstaying its welcome."
