= J. T. Tepnapa =

American film director

- Born: April 1, 1977 (age 49); Long Beach, California, U.S.
- Years active: 2000–present
- Spouse: Adam Browne
- Website: blueseraph.com

J. T. Tepnapa (born April 1, 1977) is an American writer, producer, actor, and director. Tepnapa has made several short films since 2000 with his company, Blue Seraph Productions, but he is best known for his role as the first openly gay character, Lieutenant Commander Corey Aster, on the fan series Star Trek: Hidden Frontier created by Rob Caves.

== Career ==
Tepnapa is best known for his role as the first openly gay character, Lieutenant Commander Corey Aster, on the fan series Star Trek: Hidden Frontier created by Rob Caves. In addition to playing the first openly gay character in the Star Trek franchise, Tepnapa was also entrusted with directing many of the 50+ episodes.

Tepnapa signed on to play Hikaru Sulu on the fan series Star Trek: Phase II. His first cameo appears in David Gerrold's Blood and Fire Part 2. Tepnapa has also starred opposite Brent Corrigan in the short film, In the Closet, was nominated in 2009 for the Iris Award and featured in Boys on Film 3., produced by Peccadillo Pictures.

=== Judas Kiss ===
Tepnapa's most recent project is a film titled Judas Kiss, a gay-themed sci-fi drama film starring Charlie David, Richard Harmon, and Sean Paul Lockhart, about a failed filmmaker's visit to his alma mater that results in a tug-of-war between his past and future.

Relying on some personal experiences with struggle and second chances in the film industry, Tepnapa and writing partner Carlos Pedraza manage to present a believable and engaging story nested within a science-fiction scenario. "We all go through struggles, and we learn from them," states Tepnapa. "There's no real time machine either. You start from today to improve tomorrow……I realize that sounds so much like a greeting card, but it's so true!"

Filming ended on September 5, 2010 for a 2011 release.

=== Something Like Summer ===
Tepnapa and writer Carlos Pedraza are currently ramping up efforts for a new film entitled Something Like Summer. An adaptation of the Jay Bell novel by the same name, the film, "just speaks to your soul. It's all about coming out and growing up, and first love," explains Tepnapa.

Adding a twist to the film, Tepnapa embraces the significance of visual artwork by employing the work of artist and friend, Kyle Joseph Johnson.

== Personal life ==
Tepnapa is openly gay and is married to actor Adam Browne. Tepnapa currently resides in Los Angeles, California.

== Filmography ==
Crew

- Something Like Summer (2016) (director)
- Judas Kiss (2011) (director/producer/writer)
- Make the Yuletide Gay (2009) (set decorator)
- And the Award Goes To (2007) (director/producer/writer)
- Begging for Change (2006) (director/producer/writer)
- Drag Queen Heist (2004) (director/producer/writer)
- Masturbation: Putting the Fun Into Self-Loving (2002) (director/producer/writer)
- Sunflowers (2001) (director/producer/writer/editor/special makeup effects)
- Star Trek: Hidden Frontier (2000, multiple episodes) (director/producer)

Acting

- Dead Air (2008) as Maniac
- Star Trek: Phase II (2008, multiple episodes) as Lt. Cmdr. Hikaru Sulu
- In the Closet (2008) as Griffin
- Hollywood Confidential (2008) as Jose
- And the Award Goes To (2007) as himself
- Begging for Change (2006) as Thug
- Drag Queen Heist (2004) as Bobby
- Masturbation: Putting the Fun into Self-Loving (2002) as Pez
- Sunflowers (2001) as Alex
- Star Trek: Hidden Frontier (2000) as Lt. Cmdr. Corey Aster

== Awards ==
Awards and nominations:

- 2003 - won First Prize for Masturbation: Putting the Fun Into Self-Loving (Best Comedy) at the PlanetOut Short Movie Awards
- 2004 - won Q Award for Drag Queen Heist (Gay Short Films) at the Fort Worth Gay and Lesbian International Film Festival
- 2006 - won Q Award for Begging for Change (Best Short Film) at the Fort Worth Gay and Lesbian International Film Festival
