= Star Trek: Hidden Frontier =

- Genre: Science fiction Fan series
- Created by: Rob Caves
- Starring: David Dial; Risha Denney; Larry LaVerne; John Whiting; Joanne Busch; Wayne Webb; Barbara Clifford; Bobby Rice; J. T. Tepnapa; Adam Browne
- Opening theme: Theme from Galaxy Quest
- Country of origin: United States
- Original language: English
- No. of seasons: 7
- No. of episodes: 50 total

Production
- Running time: 35–40 minutes

Original release
- Release: 2000 – 2007

Related
- Star Trek: Odyssey; Star Trek: The Helena Chronicles; Star Trek: Federation One; Star Trek: Diplomatic Relations

Star Trek: Hidden Frontier (HF) is a Star Trek fan film project. Produced on digital video, the show's sets are almost completely virtual, using a green-screen chroma keyed process to place performers into virtual settings.

The series is set after the era of the Star Trek: Deep Space Nine and Star Trek: Voyager series. In universe, it is set in the aftermath of the Dominion War. Episodes revolve around the starship USS Excelsior, and its home base, Deep Space 12, which is located in the Briar Patch, a region of space introduced in the film Star Trek: Insurrection.

Hidden Frontier has produced 50 episodes, and focuses on character relationships, including gay and lesbian characters and subplots.

Produced by Rob Caves, Hidden Frontier ran for seven seasons and was produced by volunteers in Southern California. The final episode of the series aired in May 2007. Two new spin-offs, Star Trek: Odyssey and Star Trek: The Helena Chronicles, also produced by Rob Caves, take place shortly after the end of Hidden Frontier.

== Plot ==
Based in the Briar Patch (Tikrit Expanse) introduced in Star Trek: Insurrection, on Deep Space 12, a space station in orbit of the planet Ba'ku. It follows the daily life of several officers serving on board the station and a few of the ships stationed there. Early in the series, an advanced species, the Grey, are introduced and become the primary villain, with a story arc that spans the entire series. Later, secondary villains are introduced including an Andorian trader and later the Tholians along with a man named Siroc. Mysterious ancient alien artifacts become a key focus of the series.

The crew interacts with many established species from Star Trek, including Andorians, Ba'ku, Klingons, Romulans, Son'a, and Tzenkethi.

== Cast and crew ==
=== Main cast ===
Character	Actor(s)	Rank	Position
Ian Quincy Knapp	David Dial	Rear Admiral	Commanding Officer of Deep Space 12 (former Commanding Officer, USS Excelsior)
Elizabeth Shelby	Risha Denney	Captain	Commanding Officer (former executive officer), USS Excelsior
Tolian Naros	Larry LaVerne	Captain	Commanding Officer, USS Helena (formerly executive officer, USS Excelsior)
Dr. Henglaar	John Whiting	Lieutenant Commander	Chief Medical Officer, USS Excelsior
Robin Lefler	Kelly Jamison, Joanne Busch	Commander	Executive Officer (former chief engineer), USS Excelsior
Matt McCabe	Wayne Webb	Lieutenant	Tactical Officer/Security Chief, USS Excelsior
Myra Elbrey	Barbara Clifford	Lieutenant Commander	Counselor, USS Excelsior
Ro Nevin	Arthur Bosserman, Bobby Rice	Lieutenant	Chief Science Officer, USS Excelsior
Corey Aster	J. T. Tepnapa	Lieutenant Commander	Chief Engineer (former Assistant Chief Engineer), USS Excelsior
Jorian Zen/Dao	Adam Browne	Lieutenant	Tactical Officer, USS Helena (former Helmsman, USS Excelsior)

=== Notable recurring characters ===
Character	Actor(s)	Rank	Position
Glinn Betras	Rebecca Wood	Glinn, Cardassian military	Renegade Cardassian officer in Siroc's employ
Jennifer Cole	Jennifer Cole	Rear Admiral	Commanding Officer, USS Independence
James Darwin	Cliff Gardner	Commander	Executive Officer, Deep Space 12
Artim Ibanya	Beau Christian Williams	Ensign	Junior Science Officer, USS Excelsior
Joseph Johns	Mike Johns	Commander	Executive Officer, USS Independence
Traya Knapp	Crystal Huerta, Noora Hadden, Leanna Spear, Jessica Lyons	None	Admiral Knapp's daughter
Korg	Karl Puder	General, Klingon Defense Forces	Commander of Klingon forces in the Briar Patch
Malek	Jonathan Connor-Foertsch, John Nelson, Travis Sentell	Gul, Cardassian military	Ambassador to the Federation
Silan	Kate Quigley		
William Martinez	Anthony Diaz, Dan Crout	Commander	Head of the Grey Research Facility
Jason Munoz	Jason Munoz	Lieutenant Commander	Commanding Officer, USS Olympus (former executive officer, USS Excelsior)
Jenna McFarland	Adrianne Lange, Rebecca Wood	Lieutenant	Helmsman, USS Excelsior
Alynna Nechayev	Reneé Huberstock	Admiral	Commander of Operations in the Briar Patch
Siroc	Jim Davis	None	Enemy of Tolian Naros, instigator of the Tholian War
Milo Surgant	Brandon Stacy, Lorenzo Leonard	Lieutenant	Renegade Starfleet officer in Siroc's employ
Vorina	Suzy Kaplan, Julie Anne Gardner	None	Member of the Orion Syndicate in Siroc's employ

== Background information ==
Star Trek: Hidden Frontier premiered in 2000, an offshoot of the fan series Voyages of the USS Angeles, produced by the Star Trek fan club of the same name in Southern California. For legal reasons, copies are limited to the cast and crew. No earlier series episodes are available to the public and no reference to the show is made on the club's web site. Hidden Frontier inherited the setting, Deep Space 12, and several of the characters from the Angeles series, however it established its own identity. Two later HF episodes made usage of footage originally shot for Angeles that were never produced.

Due to production expense, the series is filmed in the executive producer's home utilizing a green screen matting technique to place actors into "virtual" sets. Often, a slight green halo appears around the actors, which some viewers decry. While technique and technical standpoints of the show may not be as advanced as other fan films, it shows progress in the milieu. This amateur web-based series contains a multi-arc plot, producing at least six episodes per year. Other productions are often one-offs or released at a much slower rate.

Most episodes are released in low resolution due to potential legal issues. Currently, only five (originally six) episodes have been released in high quality: A special edition of Season 1's fourth episode, "Two Hours", Season 6's premiere and finale, "Countermeasures", "Her Battle Lanterns Lit" (released in both low and high resolutions, modified into a single regular episode), Season 7's premiere, "Heavy Losses", and the two-part series finale.

Several key roles had replacements during the seven-year run. The character of Lefler was originally played by Kelly Jamison, later portrayed by Joanne Busch. The character of Ro Nevin was originally played by Arthur Bosserman who left the cast after five seasons to pursue professional interests in music. This role was resumed by Bobby Rice.

For Seasons 2 and 3, nine episodes were produced each. The later seasons were reduced to six episodes, as nine were too much work for the volunteer cast and crew. Season 7, the final season, consists of eight episodes. In Season 6, a short fan-fic author Steve Berman writings were adapted for a memorable scene in episode "Vigil".

Hidden Frontier's theme music is taken from the film Galaxy Quest. Because of the crew's short production schedule and low budget, the music for most of HF's episodes was inherited from Paramount-owned soundtracks (both Star Trek and non-Star Trek), thus confining potential copyright issues to a single studio. Original scores were created for the last four episodes, when several composer fans of the series volunteered to create the music.

== Connection to Star Trek canon ==
- Elizabeth Shelby appeared in the TNG two part story "The Best of Both Worlds". She was also featured in the novel series Star Trek: New Frontier.
- Robin Lefler appeared in TNG episodes "Darmok" and "The Game". She was also featured in New Frontier.
- Ro Nevin is the brother of Ro Laren, who left Starfleet to join the Maquis.
- Captain Mackenzie Calhoun from New Frontier appears in "Vigil" portrayed by James Cawley. His ship, the USS Excalibur, appears briefly in "Perihelion" and "Vigil".
- Captain Hikaru Sulu and the USS Excelsior appear in "Yesterday's Excelsior".
- Wesley Crusher appears in "Echoes".
- The USS Defiant featured in the TOS episode "The Tholian Web" and Enterprise two part story "In a Mirror, Darkly" appears in "Voyage Of The Defiant".
- Artim Ibanya was introduced in Star Trek: Insurrection.
- Corey Aster is the cousin of Jeremy Aster, who appeared in the TNG episode "The Bonding".
- Alynna Nechayev made four appearances in TNG, and two appearances in DS9.
- Kira Nerys appears in "Countermeasures".
- Maya Stadi is the sister of Lieutenant Stadi who appeared the Star Trek: Voyager's premiere episode “Caretaker”.

== Episode listing ==
For a key to the abbreviations and additional notes, shown thus <1>, see the end of this section. The ratings for "Best of Season" come from a series of polls done on the Hidden Frontier forum in January 2006. A synopsis of each season is included, as well as a first air date, when known.

Season 1

From the ashes of the Dominion War, the Federation meets the Grey, a powerful confederacy of alien races. The USS Excelsior is assigned to a new starbase, Deep Space 12, which serves to protect the healing planet Ba'ku and the hidden frontier of the mysterious Briar Patch.

- HF1.01 – 2000-01-01 "Enemy Unknown, Part 1"

It is the year 2375 at the Battle of Lapolis; the Captain of the USS Devonshire, Ian Quincy Knapp is enjoying the chance to strike back at the Dominion. Under his command are his executive officer, Lieutenant Commander Rodriguez; Communications Officer, Lieutenant Paul Brickey; Medical Officer, Lieutenant Henglaar; Engineer, Lieutenant Toby Witczak, and Ensign Mark Abney.

- HF1.02 – 2000-__-__ "Enemy Unknown, Part 2"

The mysteries of the Briar Patch beckon to the crew of the USS Excelsior, under the command of Captain Ian Quincy Knapp and his new senior staff. Their first mission has them looking for an foe that Knapp already has some knowledge of, but what they will discover will shock them all.

- HF1.03 – 2000-__-__ "Enemy Unknown, Part 3"

The Excelsior leads a task force after the Grey, but her crew quickly realizes they got more than what they bargained for!

- HF1.04 – 2000-__-__ "Two Hours"

A deep space probe detects a spatial anomaly within the Briar Patch, and the USS Independence, under a skeleton crew, and led by Commander Joseph Johns, is dispatched to investigate. But, unbeknownst to them, they're about to discover that a legendary event that occurred in their past may have happened due to tampering with the timeline!

- HF1.05 – 2000-__-__ "Perihelion" - Voted best of season

Captain Knapp briefly clashes with new XO Elizabeth Shelby's attitude, before the Excelsior heads off to investigate the disappearance of the Nova-class USS Perihelion. Arriving at the ship's last known coordinates, they discover the ship in an impossibly close orbit of a quantum singularity, alongside an unknown vessel that dwarfs the Excelsior. But when an investigation reveals the strange, deleterious effects that the singularity had on the Perihelion crew and now the Excelsior crew as well, they realize what the ramifications could be for the entire galaxy.

- HF1.06 – 2001-04-29 "Echoes"

The Grey are back, but the only one who can stop them may not be willing to help.

Season 2

Conflicts with the Grey escalate as the Excelsior begins to explore the Briar Patch. Old enemies, like the Dominion, resurface and new enemies, like the Orion Syndicate, appear amid ancient mysteries.

- HF2.01 – 2001-01-01 "Refugees"

Captain Knapp welcomes two representatives of the planet Tren'La, who have had centuries of experiences with the Grey, Princess Illiana and her son, Aris. Fleeing a Grey attack, they appeal to the Federation for help, although Admiral Nechayev must turn down their request, despite the advantages their spatial fold drive may bring. But when Aris and recent Academy graduate Artim Ibanya discover Grey troops on Ba'ku, Knapp must take command of the fleet to fight off a Grey attack against Deep Space 12.

- HF2.02 – 2001-__-__ "Yesterday's Excelsior" - Voted best of season

A glimpse at what could have happened if the original Excelsior, under Captain Hikaru Sulu, had found itself falling through a temporal anomaly on its way to assist Captain Kirk at Camp Khitomer. The Federation has fallen to the Borg, having been punished by the Q Continuum for their massive retaliatory strike against the weakened Klingon Empire after the assassination of the Federation President. What remains is being led by the battlestar USS Excelsior, as they search for a safe haven, but the arrival of the original Excelsior may provide a way to do more than simply survive.

- HF2.03 – 2001-__-__ "Old Wound"

Relationships with the Dominion come under threat when Captain Knapp is accused of killing a Founder serving as an ambassador to the Federation, while on a mission to help learn more about the Grey. Commander Shelby is put in the uncomfortable position of acting as the prosecutor in the informal investigative hearing held aboard Deep Space 12.

- HF2.04 – 2001-__-__ "Great Starship Robbery"

While transporting the Excelsior's new Security Chief, Lieutenant Luko, back to Deep Space 12, Lefler and her team are abducted by Orion Syndicate pirates who want her help in siphoning off a dangerous explosive byproduct of warp engines from a derelict Starfleet vessel.

- HF2.05 – 2001-__-__ "Encke"

Investigating the destruction of the terraforming vessel Encke in orbit of a planet in the Osiris system, the Excelsior takes aboard Mission Specialist Corey Aster, an old Academy classmate of Ro and Rawlins. Ro is made uncomfortable when he realizes Aster still has feelings for him that he demonstrated while at the academy, but the two are soon working together to identify what really happened to the Encke.

- HF2.06 – 2001-__-__ "To the Stars"

With the science mission on Ba'ku now under the control of Starfleet Medical, Ensign Artim Ibanya spends some time on Excelsior as he considers whenever to take a position on a science facility on Danula II. He tells Counselor Elbrey a tale of his life just before he went off to join the academy, of how he became interested in Starfleet, met a young Lieutenant Jason Munoz, and foiled a plot of the Breen.

- HF2.07 – 2001-__-__ "Fire in the Heart"

Luko rescues Traya, a young girl who happens to be Captain Knapp's daughter, from an Orion Syndicate slave planet, but come under attack from a squadron of Grey attack fighters. Excelsior manages to fend off an attack, but suffers damage that makes them unable to jump to warp. Soon, they are easy pickings for another Grey attack, which leaves the ship disabled and the crew, scattered throughout, attempting to avert a series of calamities long enough to restore power before a Grey battleship can move in for the kill.

- HF2.08 – 2001-__-__ "Coward's Death"

An Andorian crewmember is the only casualty when a conduit accidentally ruptures on the Excelsior. Radiation causes brain damage that results in a permanent case of clinical depression. While Henglaar looks into medical avenues to help the crewman and Counselor Elbrey does her best to keep him motivated, Captain Knapp also gets involved, lest the depression become too much and he becomes a danger to himself, and others around him.

- HF2.09 – 2001-__-__ "Worst Fears, Part 1"

Aris and Illiana are stunned when Kaz, Illiana's husband, arrives at the station, but he brings news of a massing Grey armada. As Starfleet prepares to intercept the threat, Captain Knapp is relieved of command of the Excelsior, while a Board of Inquiry prepares to judge his conduct regarding the damage Excelsior took while rescuing Traya during the events of HF 2.07 - "Fire In The Heart".

Season 3

Deep Space 12 tries to repel a major Grey attack, political tensions rise among galactic powers in the Briar Patch, and a centuries-old antagonist appears at the center of a growing conspiracy.

- HF3.01 – 2002-01-01 "Worst Fears, Part 2"

With DS12 surrounded by three Grey battleships, Admiral Nechayev orders the shields fortified. She notes that they are not without resources, but Commander Darwin suggests that with the fleet away, they don't stand a chance. Knapp then reminds them that not all the ships are gone. Nechayev asks him if he has a plan - Knapp says he'd better by the time he gets to the docking ring.

- HF3.02 – 2002-__-__ "Worst Fears, Part 3"

The Grey battleships and Captain Knapp are trapped in fold space and the fleet has returned to Deep Space 12. While a debate erupts about whether they should attempt to recover the Captain without releasing the Grey, Commander Shelby and Aris mount a risky rescue operation that has long-term consequences.

- HF3.03 – 2002-__-__ "Heroes"

The Independence becomes entangled in a cat-and-mouse game that leads them to ancient archaeological artifacts indigenous to the Briar Patch. Meanwhile, Commodore Knapp and Traya spend some quality time together on a shuttlecraft. Back on Deep Space 12, meanwhile, Lieutenant Commander Lefler is haunted by her capture by Sha'kev the previous year - the nightmare worsens when Sha'kev sends her a cryptic message of his imminent return.

- HF3.04 – 2002-__-__ "In Memory Of"

After having a vision of a Borg attack, Corey Aster tells Counselor Elbrey of a mission he was on, while aboard the Olympus, when they encountered the Collective.

- HF3.05 – 2002-__-__ "Modus Operandi"

Commander Naros boards the Excelsior after being brought out of retirement for a classified mission. Nechayev is mediating a dispute between the Son'a and the Cardassians while Naros discovers startling news about the Cardassians.

- HF3.06 – 2002-__-__ "Santa Q"

As Ian Knapp, Myra Elbrey, and Traya Knapp are preparing to celebrate the Earth tradition of Christmas, a surprise visitor arrives on the station. Someone is keeping an eye on the Briar Patch and is not saying why.

- HF3.07 – 2003-01-01 "Ashes"

The Excelsior is called in to mediate a dispute between two sets of colonists after the death of one of the Federation colonists in an accident. A fundamental cultural difference threatens everything they have built. Meanwhile, Ro Nevin is struggling with the concept of a relationship with Corey Aster.

- HF3.08 – 2003-__-__ "Voyage of the Defiant" - Voted best of season

Encountering a Ferengi trader, Shelby authorizes Luko and Lefler's to obtain an old Starfleet ship. Returning the ship to DS12, Lefler assembles a team to return the old ship to active status and are granted permission to take the ship out for a cruise. But things never work out simply when they receive a distress call, and find themselves the only available help for an endangered science vessel.

- HF3.09 – 2003-__-__ "Hell's Gate, Part 1"

After receiving a distress call, the Excelsior and her escorts race to the Grey Research Facility. What they find is unexpected and deadly.

Season 4

Ancient and powerful artifacts are at the center of new conflicts among the Federation, Cardassians, Bajorans and Tholians in the Briar Patch. The crew of the Excelsior face their own personal tragedies.

- HF4.01 – 2003-__-__ "Hell's Gate, Part 2"

After the surprising find on board the freighter, Shelby orders an autopsy and an investigation to try and explain what has been going on.

- HF4.02 – 2003-__-__ "Piracy of the Noble" - Voted best of season

While en route to diplomatic negotiations on DS9, Admiral Nechayev and her away team of Excelsior personnel are kidnapped by pirates commanded by rogue Starfleet officer on board a stolen Federation starship. Meanwhile, Captain Shelby takes the Excelsior to assist the Cardassians in identifying where the pirates work from, as tensions with the Son'a increase.

- HF4.03 – 2003-09-11 "Addictions"

Henglaar is sent undercover to find the root of a drug problem on his brother's homeworld.

- HF4.04 – 2003-10-28 "Grave Matters"

Lieutenant Corey Aster and Ensign Andrew Barrett are temporarily reassigned to the USS Aldrin on a routine terraforming mission on the edges of the Briar Patch. But when they discover the mass graves of hundreds of Bajoran refugees, they must soon look for answers when the Cardassians are implicated in their deaths. Aster grows close to one of the Cardassian scientists, and comes into conflict with Ro Nevin, especially since his grandfather was one of the victims of the massacre.

- HF4.05 – 2003-12-03 "Crossroads"

The Federation discovers suspicious fleet movements by the Tholians and believe it is a precursor to launching an attack to steal the Cardassian tetrahedron. Attempting to warn the Cardassians and make preparations to join forces to stop it falls on deaf ears. The Federation decides to lay in wait outside of Cardassian space for the attack they are certain is coming.

- HF4.06 – 2004-03-26 "Entanglement, Part 1"

Henglaar faces some personal demons when his ex-fiancée, Independence Chief Engineer Sou, arrives on board with her now-husband, CMO Qu'qul. But when Qu'qul realizes his wife still has feelings for the Tellarite doctor, he challenges Henglaar to a Klingon ritual for Sou's affection! The Independence prepares to become the first starship to enter and explore the subspace currents that allows warp travel in the Briar Patch. Officers from the Excelsior investigating strange readings on Ba’ku run into an old enemy.

Season 5

For five years the Grey have stalked the Federation as Starfleet has plumbed the depths of the Briar Patch, discovering the powerful and ancient tetrahedrons. Meanwhile, the inscrutable Tholians have stepped up their own incursions in the Patch, bringing them to the verge of war with the Federation.

- HF5.01 – 2004-05-02 "Entanglement, Part 2"

Excelsior gives chase to a Breen vessel they believe may be carrying fugitive Vorina, as Henglaar and Qu'qul prepare for their showdown, despite Sou's objections. With Princess Illiana on board, and Lefler covering for Sou, the Independence begins its mission into the currents, but soon runs into Grey forces as they pillage an inhabited planet. Examining someone who the Grey returned to the surface, Cole and her crew are shocked by evidence that suggests that the Grey have been a threat for longer than realized...

- HF5.02 – 2004-06-13 "Imminent Danger"

While exploring the currents in the Briar Patch, the Excelsior crew realize the Tholians have a greater presence in the patch than previously thought. An ambush on a planet surface leaves Barrett racked with guilt and it is up to his friends and colleagues to rally round him. Meanwhile, a diplomatic conference with the Tholian Ambassador raises more questions than answers.

- HF5.03 – 2004-07-07 "Darkest Night"

The Federation is considering using Centris III as a listening post. It is believed to be uninhabited and offers a perfect chance for some well deserved shore leave. "The Camping Trip Mission" begins and Barrett, Ro and Aster get more than they bargained for. The camping trip becomes a life and death battle for one of the team.

- HF5.04 – 2004-08-04 "Security Counsel" - Voted best of season

While the Excelsior is trying to lend assistance to a world that is a long-time member of the Federation, Security Chief Matt McCabe finds himself developing suspicions that do not endear him to the world's ruling government. He grows close to a local security officer he encounters, while they investigate the supposed terrorist activities that the planet is suffering from, but they soon stumble into something far more dangerous.

- HF5.05 – 2004-10-24 "Epitaph"

Captain Shelby experiences a personal loss, while the rest of Excelsior's crew uncovers some of the secrets of the Grey. Naros history with Tren'La make working with Princess Illiana difficult, as they discover more clues that link the Grey with the tetrahedrons.

- HF5.06 – 2004-12-01 "The Battle is Joined"

Knapp and Naros lead the Antietam on a surveillance mission that gets out of control, while Zen and Aster's relationship is threatened by someone from the Trill's past.

Season 6

The Tholians make their move, and the galaxy will never be the same. New villains emerge, and new threats entangle the crew of the Excelsior in unexpected danger. Episode 6.05 has a scene based on a story written by author Steve Berman.

- HF6.01 – 2005-02-27 "Countermeasures" - Tied in vote for best overall episode

The Tholians finally make their move, and the galaxy will never be the same. Commodore Knapp deals with a rebellious daughter.

- HF6.02 – 2005-04-12 "Dancing in the Dark"

Myra Elbrey hesitantly welcomes a former student of hers to Excelsior, when Milo Surgant arrives to act as a translator for the Horta exogeologist Lt. Pergium arrives to make some headway on the studies of the Ba'ku tetrahedron. But as the mission preparations begin, she realizes that her old fears of him abusing his Betazoid talents may still hold true. When she is telepathically attacked in an act of revenge, Henglaar finally begins to understand the depth of his feelings for her.

- HF6.03 – 2005-05-01 "Homeport"

McCabe's curiosity reveals station secrets and puts the Grey Research Facility in jeopardy. The crew go about their lives as the pieces are positioned ready for the oncoming battle.

- HF6.04 – 2005-08-12 "Beachhead"

The Tholians make their move: Siroc tests a new weapon against Starfleet, while the largest meeting of Alpha Quadrant powers since the Dominion War is not going so well. They know they need to band together against the Tholians but the Federation is keeping secrets from its allies. The illegally joined Trill, Zen, has difficulty with his symbiont while the first-ever portrayed Tellarite Captain faces down the Tholians' deadly weapon.

- HF6.05 – 2005-09-28 "Vigil" - Voted best of season; tied for best overall episode

To better understand the tetrahedrons operation, an interrogation of the Orion Syndicate pirate Mason is conducted. When he reveals the location of another tetrahedron key, a mission is set up to retrieve it, with his help. But one of the officers will not return, and the others will be left reeling at the loss of one of their own. Shelby encounters a few ghosts of her own, when assigned to assist a Romulan fleet make the necessary adjustments to traverse the Patch, and runs into her former lover, Captain Mackenzie Calhoun.

- HF6.06 – 2005-11-24 "Her Battle Lanterns Lit"

In preparation for the major attack the Alliance is about to undertake, Knapp promotes Naros to the command of the USS Helena, while taking command of the fleet itself from Excelsior. Realizing Siroc may try anything to get to the Grey Dyson Sphere, Naros realizes not only is he a target, but so are Elbrey and Artim, while Shelby works on making sure her senior staff deal with the raw emotion of the loss of one of their own. Meanwhile, Siroc sets his own plan in motion to disrupt the incoming attack forces.

Season 7

Thrown into a war with sinister enemies, Starfleet and the members of the fleet attached to Deep Space Twelve fight for the safety of the Briar Patch and Federation. Shrouded by mystery and circled by villains with no remorse, the war is just beginning.

- HF7.01 – 2006-03-17 "Heavy Losses"

The battle has been lost, and now the crew of the USS Excelsior is fighting for their very lives! With the battle plan shattered, and the enemy maneuvering to annihilate them, no one is safe from the clutches of Siroc and the Tholian Assembly.

- HF7.02 – 2006-04-29 "Bound"

The Allied fleet makes further preparations to counter Siroc's next move, whatever it may be. But with the Grey continuing to be a no-show in the struggle for the tetrahedrons and Dyson sphere, the fate of Admiral Knapp's daughter hanging in the balance, and Barrett's friends still struggling with his MIA status, things are beginning to rush headlong into a breakdown.

- HF7.03 – 2006-06-23 "Past Sins"

Dao's past on Trill haunts him when he returns home in an attempt to kick-start the stalled research on the tetrahedrons, and Doctor Henglaar has his own problems when he must now take responsibility for his troubled niece - all while dealing with the hurdles of his new relationship with Counselor Elbrey. Meanwhile, Knapp secures assistance in the search for his daughter from the unlikeliest of sources.

- HF7.04 – 2006-09-01 "Hearts And Minds"

When sudden and brutal attacks by the Tholians and Breen begin to target both Starfleet and civilian craft alike, Captain Shelby must begin to battle for the hearts and minds of the Federation's closest allies. Meanwhile, Admiral Cole is confronted with overwhelming odds and an increasingly restless civilian crew in a desperate battle to survive.

- HF7.05 – 2006-11-23 "The Widening Gyre" - Music composed by Patrick Vogler

Disaster has struck for the 12th Fleet - right at the worst time it could happen. Admiral Cole and the Independence are gone, but their closest friends have no time to grieve. Now that Siroc has someone who knows the location of the Dyson sphere, it looks like it's only a matter of time before everything is lost. But that's not the only thing to worry about. The Romulans and Klingons have become restless and are beginning to talk of withdrawing from the effort against Siroc if Starfleet remains as leader of the campaign. With the walls closing in on all sides, Shelby must bear increasing pressure to win back the hearts and minds of Starfleet's allies and contend with her shrinking pool of friends and family.

- HF7.06 – 2007-01-19 "Things Fall Apart"

Old enemies, old friends, and old ideas are shaken up as Siroc's plans shift ever closer to their devastating conclusion; things are collapsing right under the feet of the Allies as he draws nearer to his victory. Meanwhile, Shelby has to face up to the toughest challenge of her career with less help than she's ever had, Dao must face his past if he has any hope of going into the future, and the prisoners must make their stand if they hope to survive the seemingly mindless brutality of Siroc and his henchmen.

- HF7.07 – 2007-03-17 "The Center Cannot Hold" - Music composed by Dex Craig

Shelby's recovered the hearts and minds of Starfleet's allies against Siroc and the Tholians - but it may be too late. With the return of an old friend and the loss of new ones under tragic circumstances, Excelsior is in a desperate race to get back to her home station, as the entire patch has suddenly gone deathly silent. If things weren't bad enough, it has come down to the wire for Naros's race to beat Siroc to the Dyson sphere and stop him from carrying out his mission. With Ro's capture, Siroc's entire checklist for his final plan is complete, and using the stolen memories from Counselor Elbrey, all that's left is getting there first.

- HF7.08 – 2007-05-19 "Its Hour Come Round At Last" (series finale)

The station is under siege by the Grey once more, as the crew of the Helena struggle to catch Siroc before he arrives at the Dyson Sphere. While the battle rages outside, Shelby and Lefler are leading a skeleton crew of 93 in a desperate ploy to restore Excelsior and rejoin the fight to protect the station's civilians. With time completely gone, all hope lies in Knapp, Martinez, Dao, Aster, and McFarland being able to figure out the Hybrid; but things are far more different - and deadly - than they seem.

Two specials exist as well set after the pilot of Odyssey

- EP 1 – "Orphans of War"

The battle to drive off the Archein Empire has met with success - and a heavy price. The Odyssey is missing in action - and feared lost; and as Starfleet searches for survivors of the latest battle alongside the Romulans, they discover that there's something that the Archeins have left behind. When Lt. S'Ceris receives a call for help from his Romulan contacts, Captain Daniel Hunter of the USS Intrepid enlists the help of an old friend to lend a hand. But when the mission goes sour, it becomes a race against time for Shelby to save her friends and destroy the last Archein stronghold in Romulan space.

- EP 2 – "Operation Beta Shield" (Movie)

"Operation Beta Shield" follows in the footsteps of "Orphans of War" and brings together the crews from Hidden Frontier and Intrepid. Fear of another invasion by the mysterious Archein Empire from the Andromeda Galaxy is running high. In order to set up a line of defense against impending invasion, a shield of allied power must be forged in the Beta Quadrant. Can the allies work together in defense of the Beta Quadrant or will old hostilities re-emerge and shatter the chances for peace and co-operation?

== Reception ==
The series has received media coverage by both journalists and news outlets.

== See also ==
- Star Trek fan productions
