= Bond of Silence =

2010 thriller television film directed by Peter Werner

- Genre: Thriller
- Screenplay by: Brian D. Young; Edithe Swensen; Teena Booth
- Directed by: Peter Werner
- Starring: Kim Raver; David Cubitt; Greg Grunberg; Charlie McDermott; Haley Ramm; Rebecca Jenkins; Nicole Oliver; Calum Worthy; Adrian Hough; Genevieve Buechner
- Music by: Scott Schirle; Derek Syverud
- Countries of origin: Canada; United States
- Original language: English

Production
- Executive producers: Ted Bauman; Howard Braunstein; Patricia Clifford; Michael Jaffe
- Cinematography: Sergei Bachlakov (photography); Terry Lewis (scenography); Micah Pridham (costume design); Russell Brady (makeup artist); Jayne Dancose (makeup artist)
- Editor: David Beatty
- Running time: 98 minutes
- Production companies: Bauman Entertainment, Jaffe/Braunstein Films, Lifetime Television

Original release
- Network: Lifetime
- Release: August 23, 2010

Bond of Silence is a 2010 Lifetime Television thriller television film directed by Peter Werner and starring Kim Raver. It is inspired by a true story.

== Plot ==
On New Year's Eve in 1997, Shane Batesman organizes a big party to which he invites all his friends and classmates, but around 200 guests show up. In the house across the street, the McIntoshes are also celebrating with some friends, but they are disturbed by the noise and Bob, the homeowner, decides to go looking for Shane to ask him to turn the volume down. Bob is unable to find Shane, who had gone off to buy more alcohol for the unexpected guests, and finds himself in what is presumably the bedroom of Shane's parents. Here, a group of boys have secluded themselves away to drink and take drugs. Bob, knowing Shane's father, asks the boys to get out but they react badly, attacking him. Bob is found on the ground severely injured, and the intervention of the ambulance is useless. He dies during the ride to hospital.

Katy, Bob's widow, is distraught. After learning that her husband did not die of a heart attack as was initially assumed, but was murdered, she seeks justice. She presses on Jackson, the detective, to find the culprit. They come up against the silence of the boys and their parents, who do everything to protect them. The community is also opposed to Katy because they feel she is persecuting innocent young people, who the community feels could never do anything wrong. Just when Katy thinks about throwing in the towel, one of the boys sends an anonymous email which includes details that shed new light on the investigations. The informant is Jordan, who has realized that her boyfriend Ryan is hiding something.

Ryan is arrested but at first does not want to answer questions from the police. Then Katy convinces him to tell the truth about the incident and promises that in return he will have all her support. Ryan decides to confess, and admits that he was the one who hit Bob repeatedly and kicked him, while his friends only shoved him. He blames the influence of alcohol. Ryan was sentenced to five years in prison and, once released, he and Katy start speaking at high schools to warn young people about the dangers of excessive alcohol consumption.

== Cast ==
- Kim Raver as Katy McIntosh
- David Cubitt as Bob McIntosh
- Greg Grunberg as detective Paul Jackson
- Charlie McDermott as Ryan Aldridge
- Haley Ramm as Jordan
- Rebecca Jenkins as Sandra
- Nicole Oliver as Pat
- Calum Worthy as Shane Batesman
- Adrian Hough as Carl
- Genevieve Buechner as Daisy

== Production ==
The film was shot in the Canadian city of Victoria, British Columbia.

== Distribution ==
The film was released in the United States on 23 August 2010 by Lifetime Television. In 2012, it was released in Europe and was distributed in the Netherlands, Sweden, Spain, Hungary and France. In Italy, it premiered on 3 June 2012 on Sky Cinema Passion.
