= Star Trek: Odyssey =

Fan-made Star Trek series

- The USS Odyssey traverses beyond the Hidden Frontier.
- Created by: Rob Caves
- Developed by: Rob Caves
- Starring: Brandon McConnell; Sam Bacsa; Adam Browne; Jennifer Cole; Tim Foutch; Michelle Laurent; Matthew Montgomery; Julia Morizawa; Sharon Savene; John Whiting
- Country of origin: United States
- No. of episodes: 10

Production
- Running time: 35-40 minutes approx.

Original release
- Release: September 22, 2007 – September 10, 2011

Star Trek: Odyssey is a science fiction web series, a Star Trek fan production from Areakt Productions, the creators of Star Trek: Hidden Frontier. Set after the end of Hidden Frontier, Odyssey follows the USS Odyssey as it struggles to get home from a dangerous mission that has taken it and her crew 2.5 million light years from home to the unknowns of the Andromeda Galaxy. This is the first Star Trek series, fan produced or otherwise, to take place outside of the Milky Way Galaxy.

The pilot for Odyssey, entitled "Iliad", was put to wide release on Saturday, September 22, 2007, and is now freely available on the official website.

According to the creator of Hidden Frontier and Odyssey, Rob Caves, Odyssey will be primarily centered on Lt. Cmdr. Ro Nevin (Brandon McConnell) in a loose retelling of Homer's classic story, Odyssey, set in the 24th century universe of Star Trek.

Ro was involved in numerous episodes of the Star Trek: Hidden Frontier series, and was in the first gay plotlines during the second season of Hidden Frontier. Caves has said that although Ro is an openly gay/bisexual character, the new series "will focus instead on new aspects of his evolving persona that have not been explored yet in Hidden Frontier".

== Cast ==
Character	Actor	Rank	Position
Ro Nevin	Brandon McConnell (formerly Bobby Quinn Rice)	Lt. Commander	Acting Captain of Odyssey.
T'Lorra	Michelle Laurent	Subcommander, Romulan military	Acting First Officer of Odyssey.
Maya Stadi	Julia Morizawa	Lieutenant	Chief of Security of Odyssey.
Dr. Owen Vaughan	Matthew Montgomery	Doctor / Lieutenant	Chief Medical Officer of Odyssey.
Joshua Gillen	Tim Foutch	Ensign	Acting Chief Engineer of Odyssey.
Alex Wozniak	Sam Bacsa	Lieutenant	Helmsman of Odyssey.
Seram	Sharon Savene	Majan of the Archein Empire	Regent-Queen of the Archein Empire.
Grand Majan Archein	Jennifer Cole	Grand Majan	Queen and ruler of the Archein Empire.
Caecus	Adam Browne	N/A	Servant of the Majan.
Morrigu	John Whiting	General	Military commander of the Archein fleet.
Moril	Jeff Jack	Protege of Morrigu, Lover to Seram, General	Military commander of the Archein fleet.

== Episode listing ==
Season one

The USS Odyssey is sent on a daring mission to stop ruthless invaders from the distant Andromeda Galaxy. But when something goes horribly wrong, Lt. Commander Ro Nevin must make the most difficult decision of his life.

- ODY1.01 - 09/22/07 "Iliad"

The war against the Tholian/Breen alliance under Ciroc is long since over, and the Federation enjoys peace within its borders once more. But in an uninhabited section of Romulan space, a new threat is brewing. Mysterious, seemingly unstoppable ships from the Andromeda Galaxy have begun an invasion. But springing forth from the vaults of the secret Grey research facility on Deep Space 12 is one last miracle to help defend the Beta Quadrant and the newly allied Romulans. Slipstream technology has the ability to enable the newest Federation starship, the USS Odyssey to traverse millions of light years in a matter of weeks. A bold mission is put together to stop the ruthless invading forces, but will it be enough to stop the vastly superior forces?

- ODY1.02 - 12/05/07 "The Wine Dark Sea"

Odyssey has survived her initial battle with the Archeins. But with the ship damaged, her crew decimated, and her new captain unsure of himself, the fight for survival has reached a crucial stage, as Odyssey's antimatter stores have been depleted through an emergency pod dump. When an attempt to obtain replacement supplies takes a turn for the worse, Acting Captain Ro Nevin must balance his desire to protect his crew with the knowledge that without fuel, none of them will survive.

- ODY1.03 - 02/27/08 "The Lotus Eaters"

The Archein's relentless pursuit of the USS Odyssey is taking its toll and Ro is having to deal with serious differences of opinion amongst his senior staff. Starfleet ideals win out over Romulan practicality as a Starfleet distress signal is detected and Odyssey is steered back into mortal danger to prevent the Archiens from committing genocide. The Archien's internal power struggles escalate as an arrest warrant is issued citing damning evidence against the target. Whose name is on the warrant and what evidence has been found?

- ODY1.04 - 4/16/08 "Vile Gods"

Cracks start to form in the uneasy alliance between the Odyssey and the Kelvans, putting Ro's life danger. Whilst dealing with the Archiens, a traitor and the kidnapping of Ro, Lieutenant Stadi begrudgingly allows Sub-Commander T'Lorra to assume command of the ship. Tensions run high as Stadi attempts to persuade T'Lorra to execute a plan to rescue their Captain. T'Lorra, now at a crossroads, has to decide to remove Stadi from her post and risk losing control of the ship or allowing the rescue to proceed and losing the Kelvans as allies.

- ODY1.05 - 11/26/08 "Keepers of the Wind"

Odyssey has struggled in the Andromeda Galaxy for a year. As Ro fights to keep his crew and ship together, a new potential ally emerges. But are the Alosians all that they seem? In the climactic season finale, Seram leads the Archeins on a mission to capture Odyssey, while Caecus searches for his true identity.

Season two

- ODY2.01 - "On the Knees of the Gods"

It's been a year since Odyssey became trapped in Andromeda. Pursued by the Archein and determined to get home, T'Lorra must face her past, and Ro must step up to the plate and negotiate with the Archein before it's too late.

- ODY2.02 - "The Immortal Loom"

With T'Lorra back on duty, and Vaughn still in the Brig, Maya Stadi is under pressure from seemingly everywhere. Will her training be enough to prepare her for what comes next? The Odyssey's journey home may depend on an apparently dead planet, but what secrets have the Archein left behind?

- ODY2.03 - "For All Time"

Season 2 draws to a close with Ro Nevin being called by the mysterious Great Ones of the Archein people. Seram moves closer with her plans of conquest as the crew of the Odyssey must prepare for the battle of their lives.

Season three

- ODY3.00 - "A Light in the Dark" (audio only)

With the fate of two galaxies hanging in the balance, Lt. Cmdr. Ro Nevin is taken on a journey through his past, as Captain Benjamin Sisko helps him to prepare for the dangerous tasks he faces when he returns to the Starship Odyssey.

- ODY3.01 - "Tossed Upon The Shore" (2 hours-video, series finale)

In the 2 hour series finale of both Star Trek: Odyssey and The Helena Chronicles, both crews must fight to return the Odyssey home to ithaca... err the Milky Way in time to save both galaxies from destruction by ever expanding black holes, stop the Archein invasion and re-unite two star-crossed lovers. This movie completes the video portion of the Star Trek: Hidden Frontier saga.

== Recasting Ro Nevin ==
Executive Producer Rob Caves announced in October 2007 that Brandon McConnell would be taking over the role of Ro Nevin. McConnell debuted as Ro Nevin in episode 2 of Odyssey, "The Wine Dark Sea."

McConnell said of his role as Ro Nevin: "They're pushing the boundary just like Gene Roddenberry's vision of Star Trek. I respect that a lot. To not say anything is to become stagnant, is to stand still. I think anyone who is a fan of Star Trek doesn't need to be beaten over the head by some political statement. The subtlety adds to the realism."

This is the second time that the character has been recast. The character was played by Arthur Bosserman in Star Trek: Hidden Frontier seasons 2 - 5, and by Bobby Rice in seasons 6 - 7 (as well as in the pilot episode of Star Trek: Odyssey).

== Notable appearances ==
Mark Lund, producer and writer of First World and a judge on the FOX TV show Skating with Celebrities, played Commander Steven Connor on the Pilot episode, "Iliad." Filming of the second episode of Odyssey, "The Wine Dark Sea", was covered by GMTV in August 2007, with presenter Ross King taking a guest role in the episode as a medical ensign. Renowned voice actor Michael McConnohie appeared in the season 1 finale as an Alosian overseer (he also appeared in another Hidden Frontier spinoff, The Helena Chronicles, as a Cardassian pirate).
