= 2 Frogs in the West =

- Film poster
- French: 2 frogs dans l'ouest
- Directed by: Dany Papineau
- Written by: Dany Papineau; Grégoire Bédard; David Uloth
- Produced by: Jacques Roiseux
- Starring: Mirianne Brulé; Dany Papineau; Jessica Malka; Germain Houde; Charlie David
- Cinematography: Christian Bégin
- Edited by: Justin Lachance
- Music by: Jérôme Boisvert
- Distributed by: Coup de cœur Distribution; OutTV
- Release date: 8 October 2010 (Montreal)
- Running time: 105 minutes
- Country: Canada
- Languages: English; French
- Budget: $450,000 CDN

2 Frogs in the West (French: 2 frogs dans l'ouest) is a Canadian comedy-drama film, released in 2010. The directorial debut of filmmaker and actor Dany Papineau, the film premiered in Montreal on October 8, 2010. It stars Mirianne Brulé, Dany Papineau, Jessica Malka, Germain Houde, and Charlie David.

== Plot ==
The film stars Mirianne Brulé as Marie, a restless young woman from Quebec who decides to drop out of university and hitchhike west to Whistler, British Columbia on a voyage of self-discovery, much to her parents' dismay. The journey to British Columbia is not an easy one, as along the way Marie experiences a myriad of bumps and mishaps, with her finally arriving in Whistler only to have her luggage stolen. After this exasperating ordeal a man by the name of Jean-François (Papineau), who is also from Québec, takes Marie in to stay with him and his two roommates, his ex-girlfriend Gaby (Malka) and their gay friend Brad (Barton). During her time there Marie experiments sexually with Gaby and through this is drawn into an unexpected love triangle with both J-F and Gaby.

The film's cast also includes Brandon Barton, Juan Riedinger, Anik Vermette, Germain Houde, Diane Lavallée, Valérie Chevalier, Charlie David, Bruno Baronet, Adam Bergquist, Rick Tae, Niels Schneider, Bill Marchant and Linda Darlow.

== Inspiration for the film ==
The film is directly inspired by director Papineau's own experience travelling from his home province of Québec to Alberta during his undergraduate degree. While in Québec he had been studying engineering at Sherbrooke, but after spending a summer on a ranch in Banff, Alberta, decided to stay there instead of returning to Sherbrooke. After having such a successful time in the western part of Canada he decided to enroll at the Vancouver Film School for a yearlong program and ended up living in Vancouver for six years. Papineau first wrote 2 Frogs as a 21-minute short film in 2004, and after receiving much acting success as a result, was able to turn the short film into the feature-length film it is today. During an interview with Papineau at the 2010 Whistler Film Festival, Papineau highlighted how the inspiration for the movie came from how the young adults who come to Whistler from all around the world go there for a couple of months to help determine what they want to do with their lives. He expressed how he felt a lot of people would recognize themselves in the film because of this.

== Reception ==
After its debut in Montreal, the movie received excellent reviews from film critics. The film was showcased at film festivals around the world, receiving many accolades for its involvement in the LGBT film community. In 2012, it was highlighted as one of the best films at the Durban Gay and Lesbian Film Festival and was also featured in many film events devoted to the LGBT community, including QFest: the Annual Houston International LGBTQ Film Festival. Although recognized abroad, the film also received recognition in Canada, in publications like the Globe and Mail and was presented in multiple Canadian film festivals. The film not only received accolades for its portrayal of the LGBT community but also for its portrayal of Canadian culture. As the film illustrates the typical adolescent Canadian experience, of a young adult leaving their long-time home in the Eastern provinces to find work in the West of Canada, the film also received awards reflecting its Canadian influences. As a highlight, the film was chosen to close the 2010 Whistler Film Festival, after the short film, "Two Frogs in the West", that it was based on had been previously featured at the festival in 2004. At the festival, the film won the festival's Best Mountain Culture Film award, an award which directly reflected the spirit of the film and the area in which the festival was held.

Although it received positive feedback at film festivals for its portrayal of both Canadian culture and the LGBT community, it received mixed reviews from its general audience for its "predictable" plotline. Some online reviews of the film described it as being unimaginative and the acting to be underwhelming while another reviewer claimed that "the problems with 2 Frogs are based pretty much entirely in the screenplay". No matter how negative or positive the reviews it received were, one thing remained consistent: that Papineau has great potential as a director. No matter the downfalls described by the film's critics, 2 Frogs "demonstrates that it's possible for a film to be bad, while still showcasing the positive potential of its writer/director".

== Awards ==
- Best Feature- Yosemite International Film Festival
- Best Film Mountain Culture- Whistler Film Festival 2010
- Best Film Mountain Culture- Revelstoke 2011
- Official Selection- Fairytales Calgary 2011
- Selection- Llambis England 2011
- Double nomination- RVCQ Montreal 2011
