= Timo Descamps =

Belgian actor

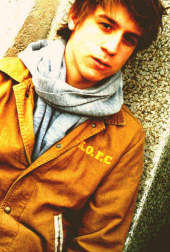
- Born: 27 May 1986 (age 40); Kontich, Antwerp, Belgium
- Occupations: Actor; singer
- Years active: 2004–present
- Website: timodescamps.be

Timo Descamps (born 27 May 1986) is a Belgian actor and singer best known for his former roles on the soap operas Spring and Familie. In 2007, Descamps released his first music single, "Phonecall", which rose to 36 on the Ultratop 50. In 2010, it was announced that Descamps would be co-starring in the film Judas Kiss, playing the character of Shane Lyons.

== Career ==
=== Television ===
Timo's television debut was in 2004, appearing on the Belgian soap opera Familie. His character, Ghijs, was a problem child in the home of Marc and Mieke. After growing up and leaving home, Ghijs returned for the funeral of Marc and Lennart.

From 2005 to 2008, Descamps portrayed Jo De Klein, the new bass player of the music group in Spring. In his spare time, Jo was a painter and loved strange pets: he had a pet Tarantula called Mary and after its death he got a snake he named Picasso.

In 2006, Descamps competed on Steracteur sterartiest, a televised Belgian singing competition, finishing in third place. In 2009–2010, Descamps played the role of South African emigre Nelson Batenburg on the Dutch series SpangaS.

In addition to his acting roles, Descamps has worked as an onscreen host for Disney Channel The Netherlands & Flanders and for the Belgian VT4 Network. In 2007, he hosted the show Superstar: The Battle on Nickelodeon. He is currently hosting for OutTV.

=== Film ===
Timo Descamps made his motion picture debut in the 2011 film Judas Kiss, released by Blue Seraph Productions, playing the privileged bad boy Shane Lyons. Judas Kiss is also Descamps' feature debut to an American and international audience.

=== Voice acting ===
Prior to making his film debut with Judas Kiss in 2011, Descamps provided his voice for the Flemish adaptions of such films as 2006's Happy Feet, in which he voiced Mumble, 2007's Surf's Up, voicing protagonist Cody Maverick, and 2010s How to Train Your Dragon, voicing the lead of Hiccup.

=== Theatre ===
In September 2008, Descamps played Dolf Vega in the musical version of Crusade in Jeans.

== Personal life ==
In 2009, Descamps publicly announced his homosexuality and relationship with Danny de Jong.

== Discography ==
In 2007, Descamps released his a single "Phonecall", which rose to number 36 on the Ultratop 50. Three years later, he released the single "Like It Rough". In 2011, Descamps released his third single, entitled "Tomorrow".

== Filmography ==
Film
Year	Film	Role	Notes
2006	Happy Feet	Mumble	Voice only; Belgian Dutch adaption
2007	Surf's Up	Cody Maverick	Voice only; Belgian Dutch adaption
2010	How to Train Your Dragon	Hiccup	Voice only; Belgian Dutch adaption
2011	Judas Kiss	Shane Lyons	U.S. and international film debut
2012	More	Leader	Short film
2013	Lost Angel	Michael	Short film
2014	The Dark Place	Wil Roelen	
Television
Year	Title	Role	Notes
2004–2005	Familie	Ghijs	2 episodes
2005–2008	Spring	Jo De Klein	Recurring cast (12 episodes)
2009–2010	Spangas	Nelson Batenburg	Recurring cast (104 episodes)
2010	David	Dries	1 episode
2010	Aspe	Tom Sioen	1 episode
2011	De Kotmadam	Dries	1 episode
Reality television
Year	Title	Role	Notes
2006	Steracteur sterartiest	Himself	Contestant; second runner-up
2007–2008	Zo is er maar één	Himself	Contestant

== Awards ==
Year	Award	Category	Result	Role
2009	John Kraaijkamp Musical Awards	Rising talent Award: Best Newcomer in a musical	Nominated	"Dolf" in Crusade in Jeans
2009	VMP – Flemish Musical Awards	Rising talent Award: Best Newcomer in a musical	Won	"Dolf" in Crusade in Jeans
2010	VMP – Flemish Musical Awards	Best supporting actor in a musical	Nominated	"Man" in Ganesha
2011	Holebipersoonlijkheid	Male Gay Icon (Belgium)	Won	Career
