= Topstars =

Topstars is a Dutch adaptation of Belgian children's soap Spring about a rock band rehearsing at the dance school of the same name. Both versions are produced by Studio 100. Starting out on October 26, 2004, Topstars ran for three seasons on channel Z@PP.

== Storylines ==
The storylines are about group of young people finding themselves and the scene revolving around dance school Topstars. The girls share an interest in dancing, fashion and photography. The boys are passionate about music. Love, friendship and competition are recurring themes, but in the end friendship conquers all.

=== Season 1 ===
- Peggy Lejeune, a one-time professional dancer who saw her career ended by a foot injury, runs Topstars with her wisecracking kid brother Ruben serving the drinks. Due to her lack of business instinct the dance school isn't doing well financially; therefore Peggy and the girls take part in a contest.
- The all-girls' aspect of Topstars is offset further by the namesake band renting rehearsal space; the members are Ruben on keyboards, garage owner's son Tom on drums, odd-job man Bas on guitar and policeman's son Daan on vocals and bass. However, Ruben starts skipping rehearsals and eventually finds himself replaces with Bas' cousin Lars. He swears revenge; he cancels the rent, sabotages a meeting with a record executive and hooks up with Olivier, a shady character who's dating Daan's sister Marieke. Olivier locks up Bas for being competition (nobody believes the latter's version of events) and sells Ecstasy to Lars who works as a DJ in his spare time. Lars turns out to be no angel himself; he skips rehearsals too and nicks Tom's girlfriend Anna. Tom is not happy when he finds out the true reason he's been dumped and after a well-deserved punch-up he announces his departure on a radio show. "Topstars are looking for a new drummer because him over there couldn't keep his dirty hands off my girlfriend". He also swears never to set foot again at the dance school. The others manage to get Olivier banned from the place but Peggy tears a strip off everyone because they kept her in the dark all the time. "Don't you trust me or something? The next time, and I hope for you lot that there won't be a next time, I call the police. Topstars is a drug-free place and it stays that way!". Tom is coaxed back into the band and at the showcase they earn a recording contract.
- Marieke is Topstars' lead dancer but her position is jeopardised by the arrival of Bo, daughter of Peggy's nemesis Marie-France (who is believed to be responsible for the accident). They actually become the best of friends and Marieke even starts doing photoshoots for Marie-France's model agency. Problem is that the shoots clash with Peggy's lessons, and with the risk of contract breach it becomes difficult to choose. On the day of the contest Marieke is finally able to do both; well, that's what she thinks cause Marie-France ensures that things run out of schedule. Marieke ends up stranded but thanks to Daan and Bas (happy to forgo a meet-and-greet with U2) she ends up doing a synchronised solo with Bo at the contest dancing Topstars to the first prize.

=== Season 2 ===
- Despite winning the dance contest, the financial problems ain't over; Topstars are in danger of being sold at a public auction. Marie-France seizes the opportunity and steps up as financial manager. Peggy refuses to let go of the reins; she now has a relationship with Robert (who spent a few years in Thailand), and he helps her saving the dance school from falling into his evil ex-wife's hands.
- Bo breaks her leg and takes her Dad's advice of starting a career in music (much to Marie-France's disgust). She records the self-written "I'm Gonna Be A Star" with Lars, but the ex-Topstars member hands it over to the newly arrived Monica who has no intention of giving Bo any credits. Robert steps in and suggests for the best singer to get her version released. Bo wins, and Lars loses; after all "there is no us".
- As if Lars walking out wasn't bad enough, singer/bassist Daan is sidelined by his parents because he failed graduation. Ruben agrees to return on the one condition that he becomes the drummer and lead vocalist ("The world needs to hear my beautiful voice"). Tom switches from drums to vocals/guitar and Bas from guitar to bass/keyboards. At their upcoming gig they're signed by a manager (Wim) who insists that the lineup stays the same.
- Still reeling from her breakup with Tom (who now dates Bo), Anna turns lesbian and writes an anonymous love letter to Marieke who's far from amused with such a silly move. Ruben falls for Monica and introduces himself as head of the dance school; a lie that catches up with him when he crashes a stolen car belonging to Tom's Dad. During a night at the disco (where Anna fails to impress Marieke with her punky image) Ruben moves on to bartender Kim.
- Daan passes his re-exams but no thanks to Joost and Bart who sold him the wrong questions; worse yet, the deal has been photographed so they can ask for more money claiming they haven't seen any. Unable to rejoin the band Daan resorts to plundering the Topstars vault (at this point Bas works on the night shift but Marie-France, already unimpressed with what she got on her plate, has him fired for blowing it); Femke finds out by discovering the money in his cupboard and forces him to tell the truth. Although furious the boys are willing to help him exposing the bullies' involvement in a car-thieving scheme (and consequently miss their first video shoot). This heroic deed results in Daan's return to Topstars.

=== Season 3 ===
- Peggy is excited to re-launch Topstars but there's a dark cloud on the horizon; Robert has accepted a job in a foreign country. Meanwhile, Femke thinks she's pregnant and moves in with Daan, only to see their relationship unfold
- The boys celebrate their first CD-release but the good vibes disappear once they're confronted with a huge studio bill. They have to pay otherwise their instruments will be confiscated.
- Robert nearly signs a contract that makes Marie-France the new owner of his share in Topstars. Peggy finds out and arrives in time to rip up the contract, but her trust is irreparably damaged.
- Fresh from an ill-fated brush with web dating Bas tries his hand at frying chips. He finds a girlfriend in his employer Sophie (who used to be Tom's summer love); her Dad, Henk, is willing to become the band's new manager.
- Taking Victor's advice Marie-France sets up her own dance school; up to Monica (Bo's non-rent paying housemate at Robert's place) to persuade the girls to attend and to sign a committing contract.
- Lars returns as a radio host/agony uncle; his former bandmates begrudge him for doing a runner to the States and seek the opportunity to tell him so.
- Peggy's world falls apart when she's tricked into attending the launch of the MF Dance Academy; stabbed in the back by her faithful pupils. The contracts turn out to be invalid as teacher Lorenzo, who handed them over, is no employee of Marie-France. Payback time.
- The boys fall victim to Henk's weird sense of humour; recording an awful chip-advertising song ("Het Frietlied") and performing it in even more awful yellow suits opposite the chip shop. However, Henk's biggest joke has yet to come.
- Anna feels ignored now Marieke spends much more time with Femke and places a microphone in Marieke's bag to stir things up. Lars is rightly concerned that she makes a big mistake; once Marieke and Femke find out they teach Anna a lesson.
- Lars has taped the "Chip Song" for heavy-rotation airplay; this results in a studio invasion. Henk is livid when he finds out.
- Anna makes an on-radio apology, but to no avail. Persuaded by Monica telling tales about Peggy she joins the MF Dance Academy. Unsurprisingly Marie-France has other plans with "the chubby one" than mentioned.
- Henk sends the band to a non-existent festival in Salou with a bag of coke attached to their van; they end up inside at customs risking life. Luckily Daan is not there, as Tom threw him out for fancying Bo big time.
- Topstars are given a television performance, but Marie-France sets up a trap for the producer that could destroy his marriage.
- When Henk finds out that Sophie took the rap he immediately reports himself to the police.
- Anna learns from the blackmail footage and on Lars' instructions she removes it from Marie-France's computer, making her the heroine of the day.
- Taking his Mum's advice too seriously, Daan follows his heart and searches for Bo who left to clear her mind. He reconciles with Lars who joins him on the trip; they get involved in a car accident.

=== The lost season ===
In January 2007 Topstars was discontinued, although the storylines for the fourth season were already written.

- Lars contracts a concussion and a jape on his shoulder. Daan is worse off; once he regains consciousness the first thing he does is asking for Bo. She's stuck in a guilt trip and is not allowed to see Marieke's hospitalised brother. Tom, a free agent again, warns Daan that Bo only chose him because she feels sorry for him and that their relationship will not last. Not wanting to lose the both of them, Tom eventually swallows his pride while Liesbeth puts Bo back in action.
- Femke decides that it is no use clinging on to an unrequited love and moves to Paris for career opportunities.
- Henk is sentenced to a few years in prison. Despite getting regular visits he refuses to accept Bas as his son-in-law to-be.
- After her heroic deed, Anna is rewarded with a television show. Marieke is given a job backstage. They are too busy to continue dancing at Topstars, so Peggy and the girls make regular appearances on the show.
- Ruben still dreams of a relationship with Monica, and suggests that Peggy gives her a lead role in future performances. Monica still has better things to think of.
- Marie-France wisens up and folds her dance academy. Although happy pulling the strings at her modeling agency again she'll never admit that she's drawn the shortest straw.
