= Bump! =

- Genre: Documentary; Travel
- Country of origin: Canada
- Original language: English

Production
- Production location: International
- Running time: 45 minutes

Original release
- Network: OUTtv
- Release: 2004 – 2012

Bump! is a Canadian LGBT travel television series produced by Canadian media company Bumper 2 Bumper Media, an exclusive partnership between Canada's Pink Triangle Press and Peace Point Entertainment Group. It aired on Canada's PrideVision (now OutTV) from 2004 to 2012. The show was also sold to PinkTV in France and the Here! channel in the United States.

Bump! was hosted by Deb Pearce and Charlie David; David joined as host with the start of Season 2. Each episode lasts 45 minutes.

== International broadcasters ==
Country	TV Network(s)
Canada	OutTV
France	Pink TV
Israel	EGO
Netherlands	OutTV
United States	here!, Logo
Germany	TIMM
