= Kirk Thatcher =

American writer, producer, director, and production designer

- Thatcher at Dragon Con 2026 in Atlanta, GA
- Born: Kirk R. Thatcher; Los Angeles, California
- Occupations: Writer, producer, director, production designer
- Years active: 1985–present

Kirk R. Thatcher is an American writer, producer, television and film director, an Internet video director, and a production designer.

== Personal life ==
Thatcher was born and raised in Los Angeles, California. While attending Harvard-Westlake Upper School he met Joe Johnston, a production designer for Star Wars. Johnston would later work with Thatcher on his first job in the industry, as a technical assistant on the ILM creature crew of Return of the Jedi.

== Film ==
Thatcher began his career at eighteen, leaving UCLA Film School to work at George Lucas' special effects facility, Industrial Light and Magic (ILM). Thatcher was the production designer on David Fincher's first music videos and spent over a year creating the look for a number of Rick Springfield and The Motels videos. Subsequently, Thatcher was hired by Leonard Nimoy to associate produce Star Trek IV: The Voyage Home. In the film, he also portrayed a punk rock fan whom Kirk and Spock encounter loudly playing the song "I Hate You" on a boombox on a public bus. Spock incapacitates the punk using the Vulcan nerve pinch, to the delight of the other passengers. Thatcher wrote and performed the song, recording it with sound designer Mark Mangini. Thatcher earns no additional money for the non-speaking role of "Punk" but does receive "like 8-cent residuals" for the song.

Thatcher's first directorial effort was in 2002, with It's a Very Merry Muppet Christmas Movie for NBC, which drew more than 11 million viewers. Thatcher has co-written several Muppet films including Muppet Treasure Island (1996) and directed three television movies, including A Muppets Christmas: Letters to Santa (2008) and The Muppets' Wizard of Oz (2005), which premiered at Robert De Niro's Tribeca Film Festival.

In 2015, Thatcher directed Turkey Hollow, a Thanksgiving-themed TV movie for The Jim Henson Company which aired on Lifetime. Thatcher is also credited as one of the three writers of the film, alongside Jim Henson and Jerry Juhl. Kirk Thatcher makes a cameo appearance as "Punk Rock Guy" in the 2017 film Spider-Man: Homecoming, as a homage to his role as "Punk on Bus" in Star Trek IV: The Voyage Home.

In October 2021, Thatcher wrote and directed Muppets Haunted Mansion.

In 2024, Thatcher's voice was featured in the Pixar film Inside Out 2.

== Television ==
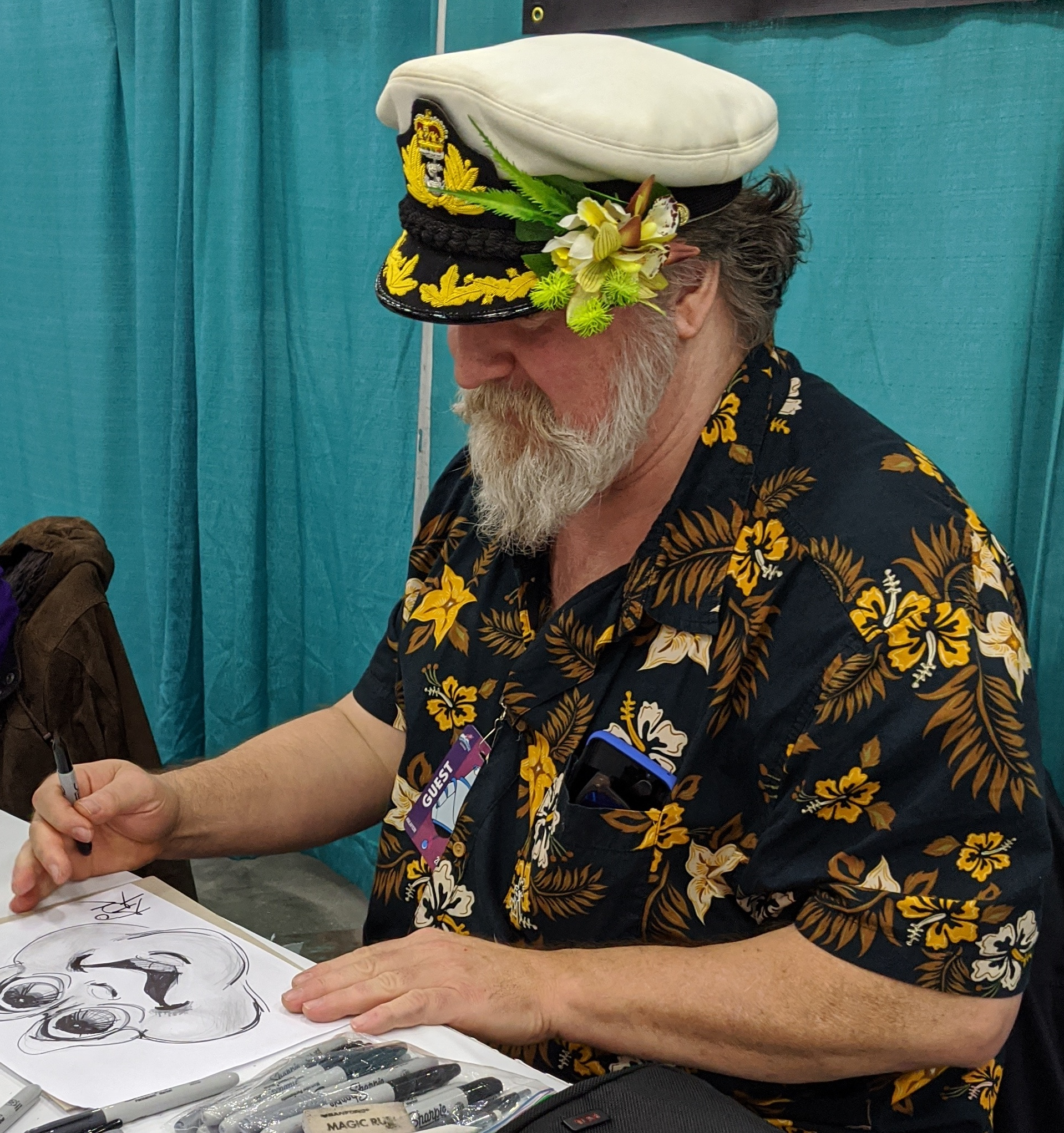
Thatcher at GalaxyCon Louisville in 2019

Thatcher was a supervising producer on the Emmy Award-winning ABC series Muppets Tonight.

Thatcher has also written episodes for the Cartoon Network series Foster's Home for Imaginary Friends, and directed episodes of Nickelodeon's series LazyTown, PBS' Sid the Science Kid, and Comedy Central's Crank Yankers.

In 2014, Thatcher was seen on the SyFy Network's series Jim Henson's Creature Shop Challenge, where he appeared in each episode as a judge for the competition.

Thatcher returned to the Star Trek franchise in 2019, narrating in the Star Trek: Short Treks episode "Ephraim and Dot". In 2022 he played an older and wiser version of the "Punk on the Bus" in the second season of Star Trek: Picard. That same year, he announced via his Instagram page that he would be writing for Mystery Science Theater 3000, and portrayed Joshua Jovan in the Marvel Cinematic Universe Disney+ TV special Werewolf by Night.

== Internet and commercials ==
Thatcher has also directed The Muppets' "Bohemian Rhapsody", which won the "Viral Video" category in the 14th Annual Webby Awards. He has also directed 2015 Muppet Music videos "Jungle Boogie" and "Kodachrome".
