= The Dark Place =

- Poster for The Dark Place
- Directed by: Jody Wheeler
- Written by: Jody Wheeler
- Produced by: Carlos Pedraza; Jody Wheeler; J.T. Tepnapa
- Starring: Sean Paul Lockhart; Timo Descamps; Blaise Embry
- Cinematography: David Berry
- Edited by: Steve Parker
- Music by: David John; Joe Terrana
- Production company: Blue Seraph Productions
- Distributed by: Breaking Glass Pictures; PRO-FUN media Filmverleih
- Release date: June 14, 2014
- Running time: 87 minutes
- Country: United States
- Language: English

The Dark Place is a 2014 mystery-thriller film written and directed by Jody Wheeler. It stars Blaise Embry, Timo Descamps, Sean Paul Lockhart and Eduardo Rioseco.

== Plot ==
Keegan Dark (Blaise Embry), the protagonist, has a condition called hyperthymesia, a condition that makes a person remember almost every single moment of their life. Keegan Dark and his boyfriend (Timo Descamps) arrive at the mansion of Keegan's estranged mother Mrs. Celeste Dark (Shannon Day) where not only is he constantly being haunted by his past, but also discovers a plot that puts his life and lives of his loved ones in danger. Along the way we meet Keegan's new step-father and step-brother (Andy Copeland and Sean Paul Lockhart) and his ex-boyfriend/Mrs. Dark's lawyer, Ernesto (Eduardo Rioseco).

== Cast ==
- Blaise Embry as Keegan Dark
- Timo Descamps as Wil Roelen
- Sean Paul Lockhart as Jake Bishop
- Eduardo Rioseco as Ernie Reyes
- Shannon Day as Celeste Dark
- Andy Copeland as Adrian Bishop
- Shade Streeter as Young Keegan
- Genevieve Buechner as Wendy Luckenbill
- Allison Lane as Sherriff Timmer
- Joshua Stenseth as Collin Dark
- Jessica Hendrickson as Lucinda
- Denny McAuliffe as Young Ernie
- Kendall Wells as Calvin
- Harold Phillips as Steven Dark
- Ron Boyd as Deputy Nelson

== Production ==
=== Development ===
It is produced by J.T. Tepnapa and Carlos Pedraza. It was produced by Blue Seraph Productions.

The film was shot in Hillsboro and Portland, Oregon, USA.

== Reception ==
=== Reviews ===
Ed Kennedy from The Backlot said, "Refreshing... a real thriller with a beautiful setting, georgeous actors with complicated relationships". Timothy Junes of the Zizo Online commented, "'The Dark Place' is neither a masterpiece nor a monster of a film. It's refreshing to see where homosexuality is a given and no theme in itself. Entertaining".

=== Awards ===
Year	Category	Recipient(s)	Result
TLA Gaybie Awards
2015	Best Thriller	"The Dark Place"	Won
