= Jim Henson's Creature Shop Challenge =

American game show

- Genre: Reality
- Presented by: Gigi Edgley
- Judges: Brian Henson; Beth Hathaway; Kirk Thatcher
- Country of origin: United States
- Original language: English
- No. of seasons: 1
- No. of episodes: 8

Production
- Executive producers: Brian Henson; Lisa Henson; Joseph Freed; Rob Bagshaw
- Production company: The Jim Henson Company

Original release
- Network: Syfy
- Release: March 25 – May 13, 2014

Jim Henson's Creature Shop Challenge is an American reality television game show on the Syfy cable network. It premiered on March 25, 2014, and ended on May 13, 2014.

== Plot ==
A group of Creature Designers compete against each other to create puppets and animatronics such as those found in science fiction, comedy and kids' and family shows.

Actress Gigi Edgley from Jim Henson's Farscape serves as the show's host.

The judges will critique the creature designs that the contestants make where the featured puppeteers will perform the creatures on the Henson Sound Stage. The contestants wait in the screening room for the verdict and the least worthy contestant will be eliminated by Brian Henson. The winner gets prize money and a contract to work with Jim Henson's Creature Shop for a combined total of $100,000.

== Judges ==
The judges for this show consist of:

- Brian Henson – The son of Jim Henson who is the chairman of The Jim Henson Company, a writer, a film director, and a puppeteer who had previously worked with The Muppets, was the lead puppeteer for Audrey II in Little Shop of Horrors and performed Hoggle in Labyrinth (1986)
- Beth Hathaway – A fabrication specialist who worked on Jurassic Park (1993), Edward Scissorhands (1990), Terminator 2: Judgment Day (1991), Inglourious Basterds (2009), The Walking Dead, Django Unchained (2012), and The Chronicles of Narnia: The Lion, the Witch and the Wardrobe (2005).
- Kirk Thatcher – A production designer who created creatures for Return of the Jedi (1983), E.T. the Extra-Terrestrial (1982), Star Trek II: The Wrath of Khan (1982), and Gremlins (1984). He has also done some designing of the characters from The Jim Henson Hour, CityKids, Dinosaurs, and Aliens in the Family.

== Mentors ==
The show also features mentorship from the Creature Shop's staff ranging from:

- Peter Brooke – The Creature Shop Creative Supervisor. He worked on Where the Wild Things Are, The Producers, Cats & Dogs, Dr. Dolittle, The Flintstones, That Puppet Game Show, Dinosaurs, The Storyteller, and Brats of the Lost Nebula.
- Julie Zobel – The Lead Fabricator. She worked on Sesame Street, Fraggle Rock, Dinosaurs, Muppets Tonight, Sid the Science Kid, Where the Wild Things Are, George of the Jungle, Dr. Dolittle, Cats & Dogs, and Forgetting Sarah Marshall as well as concert constructions for Lady Gaga, Kanye West, and Deadmau5.
- John Criswell – The Mechanical Engineer. He worked on Spaced Invaders, A Nightmare on Elm Street 4: The Dream Master, Critters, Dinosaurs, Star Kid, Adventures in Dinosaur City, Pushing Daisies, Sid the Science Kid, The Hangover, Where the Wild Things Are, George of the Jungle, and Cats & Dogs.

== Contestants ==
- Chaz Vance – Special-effects and entertainment designer from West Falls, New York. He was eliminated in episode one when the sea creature he and Robert created wasn't realistic enough and the head of the sea creature that Chaz made reminded Kirk Thatcher of H.R. Pufnstuf.
- Tina Roland – Freelance effects artist from Hollywood, California. She was eliminated in episode two because the arms she made for her group's Skeksis didn't have much action in them.
- Josh Smith – Creature costumer and prop builder from Minot, North Dakota. He forfeited the contest in episode three because it would be difficult to be with his family and work at Jim Henson's Creature Shop.
- Ivonne Escoto – Freelance special-effects artist from Los Angeles, California. She was eliminated in episode four because her hunting trophy character was classified as unfinished by Brian Henson due to the time limit. She returned in episode eight to help Robert take the win.
- Lex Rudd – Puppet and creature costume-maker from Guerneville, California. She was eliminated in episode five because the legs she made for her creature weren't realistic enough in the creature's movement.
- Russ Adams – Special-effects artist and creature creator from Ogden, Utah. He was eliminated in episode six because his swamp creature wasn't camouflaged enough and its paint job didn't belong comfortably. He later returned in episode eight to help Robert take the win.
- Jake Corrick – Student and sculptor from Belle Vernon, Pennsylvania. He was eliminated in episode seven.
- Melissa Doss – Housewife and freelance special-effects artist from Fort Wainwright, Alaska. She is a runner-up in the contest.
- Ben Bayouth – Freelance special-effects artist from Woodland Hills, California. He is a runner-up in the contest.
- Robert Bennett – Sculptor for Walt Disney Imagineering from Orlando, Florida. He is the winner of the contest.

== Contestant progress ==
Contestant	Episode							
Contestant	1	2	3	4	5	6	7	8
Robert	LOW	WIN	IN	HIGH	IN	HIGH	IN	WINNER
Ben	IN	HIGH	WIN	WIN	HIGH	LOW	WIN	RUNNER-UP
Melissa	IN	HIGH	IN	LOW	WIN	WIN	IN	RUNNER-UP
Jake	IN	HIGH	LOW	HIGH	LOW	IN	OUT	
Russ	LOW	LOW	LOW	IN	IN	OUT		
Lex	HIGH	HIGH	IN	IN	OUT			
Ivonne	IN	LOW	HIGH	OUT				
Josh	WIN	HIGH	QUIT					
Tina	LOW	OUT						
Chaz	OUT							

The contestant won 'Jim Henson's Creature Shop Challenge'.
The contestant was a runner-up.
The contestant won a Challenge.
The contestant was part of a team that won the Challenge.
The contestant was in the top in the Challenge.
The contestant was in the middle in the Challenge.
The contestant was in the bottom in the Challenge.
The contestant was in the bottom team in the Challenge.
The contestant was eliminated.
The contestant has quit the contest.

== Episodes ==
=== Episode 1: What Lies Underneath ===
Teams	Sea Creature
Ben & Melissa	Scuttleslurp
Chaz and Robert	Floyd
Ivonne and Jake	Shellrock
Josh and Lex	Devil Prawn
Russ and Tina	Ethel the Gutter Tuna

- Airdate: March 25, 2014
- Creature Brief: Peter Brooke mentors the Creature Designers into building the full-bodied puppet of a never-before-seen sea creature. Alice Dinnean, Nameer El-Kadi, Drew Massey, Misty Rojas, and Michelan Sisti are the featured puppeteers.
  - Top Looks: Josh & Lex
  - Bottom Looks: Chaz & Robert, Russ & Tina
    - Winner: Josh
    - Eliminated: Chaz

=== Episode 2: Return of the Skeksis ===
Teams	Skeksis	Foreign Land
Ben, Jake, and Lex	skekGeth	Frozen Wasteland
Ivonne, Russ, and Tina	skekTaro	Arid Desert
Josh, Melissa, and Robert	skekSith	Decaying Forest

- Airdate: April 1, 2014
- Creature Brief: Julie Zobel mentors the Creature Designers while they create a Skeksis from The Dark Crystal that has been banished to a foreign land on the planet Thra and have been called back to the castle. Alice Dinnean, Drew Massey, and Victor Yerrid are the featured puppeteers.
  - Top Looks: Robert, Melissa, & Josh and Ben, Jake, & Lex
  - Bottom Looks: Russ, Ivonne, Tina
    - Winner: Robert
    - Eliminated: Tina

=== Episode 3: Assembly Inspired ===
Teams	Junk Creature
Ben and Ivonne	Swarf
Jake and Russ	ZZ867
Lex and Josh	Subject H2735 (nicknamed "Hungry Horace")
Melissa and Robert	Pickles

- Airdate: April 8, 2014
- Creature Brief: John Criswell mentors the Creature Designers when they create a creature made from the junk that was in Apex Electronics. The creatures in question have been hiding in junk for so long that they have become one with the junk. They are also provided with a cage for the creature to be in where they are trying to escape. Alice Dinnean, Artie Esposito, Sean Johnson, Drew Massey, Michael Oosterom, and Victor Yerrid are the featured puppeteers.
  - Top Looks: Ben and Ivonne
  - Bottom Looks: Jake and Russ
    - Winner: Ben
    - Eliminated: Josh (he forfeited the contest)

=== Episode 4: Heads Up ===
Creature Designer	Revived Fantasy Creature Head
Ben	Sherman Oakmeyer (made from a horse mold)
Jake	Fenrez the Frost Troll (made from a bear mold)
Robert	Jasper the Party Planner (made from a warthog mold)
Ivonne	"Aah!" (made from a honey badger mold)
Melissa	Orson: Cousin of Loch Ness Monster (made from a sheep mold)
Russ	Cecil the Minotaur (made from a cow mold)
Lex	Chupacadabra (made from a bobcat mold)

- Airdate: April 15, 2014
- Creature Brief: Peter Brooke mentors the Creature Designers when they create a fantasy creature that has been slain and returns to life as a hunting trophy mounted on the wall at the Wizard's Mansion. The slain fantasy creature must be made from an animal foam mold which will be given to the Mold Makers to have the molds made for the slain creature. The project must include puppetry with some mechanisms in it which must be performed on the Wizard's Mansion set with the hunting trophy explaining how it ended up in this fate. Donald Faison appears in the episode where he plays the Wizard who interviews each hunting trophy in his possession. Julianne Buescher, Alice Dinnean, Artie Esposito, Drew Massey, Michelan Sisti, Colleen Smith, and Victor Yerrid are the featured puppeteers.
  - Top Looks: Ben, Jake, and Robert
  - Bottom Looks: Ivonne and Melissa
    - Winner: Ben
    - Eliminated: Ivonne

=== Episode 5: Life in Motion ===
Teams	Large Believable Creature
Lex and Jake	Tiny the Dinosaur
Ben and Melissa	Longneck Loon
Russ and Robert	Lady Caw-Caw

- Airdate: April 22, 2014
- Creature Brief: After the Creature Designers have seen the large-scale Unicorn puppet that was used in one of Lady Gaga's tours, John Criswell mentors the Creature Designers where they create a large-scale believable creature that has real movement while running their ideas with teams' appointed puppeteers. They will also use UV paint to make it glow in the dark as part of a way to bring it to life in the dark. The large-scale creatures will be performed in the black light room. Alice Dinnean, Nameer El-Kadi, and Drew Massey are the featured puppeteers.
  - Top Looks: Ben and Melissa
  - Bottom Looks: Lex and Jake
    - Winner: Melissa
    - Eliminated: Lex

=== Episode 6: Swamp Things ===
Creature Designers	Camouflaged Swamp Creature
Melissa	Phil the Long-Bladed Swamp Fowl (disguised as grasses)
Ben	Boulder Munch (disguised as a mossy boulder)
Jake	Root Breaker (disguised as old, gnarled wood)
Robert	Mildred (disguised as a lilypad)
Russ	Green Gene (disguised as weeping juniper)

- Airdate: April 29, 2014
- Creature Brief: Upon the Creature Designers seeing the development of the swamp set, Julie Zobel mentors the Creature Creators where they create a swamp creature that can camouflage itself into its surroundings until they reveal themselves to eat some "Scramp Scrats". While the lighting crew and art department finishes up the swamp set, the Creature Designers must also include some mechanism in their creatures. Neville Page appears as a guest judge. Artie Esposito, Sean Johnson, Drew Massey, Michael Oosterom, and Michelan Sisti are the featured puppeteers.
  - Top Looks: Melissa, Robert
  - Bottom Looks: Ben, Russ
    - Winner: Melissa
    - Eliminated: Russ

=== Episode 7: Alien Press Conference ===
Creature Designers	Alien Diplomat
Melissa	Ambassador Basithe from the planet Kita
Ben	King Karg from the planet Kargon
Jake	High Warlord Abiden
Robert	Reginald Marklar from the planet Marklar

- Airdate: May 6, 2014
- Creature Brief: Gigi brings her Farscape co-star Rygel to the workshop to offer inspiration when the Creature Designers are given the task to build their original alien diplomat (which has a large outer head that has a smaller inner head as its real head as a way of traveling incognito) attending an intergalactic press conference before the Intergalactic Council as they are mentored by Peter Brooke. Barry Sonnenfeld appears as a guest judge. Alice Dinnean, Nameer El-Kadi, Artie Esposito, Sean Johnson, Drew Massey, Michelan Sisti, Allan Trautman, and Victor Yerrid are the featured puppeteers.
  - Winner: Ben
  - Eliminated: Jake

=== Episode 8: Tavern at the Crossroads ===
Creature Designers	Eliminated Creature Designer Assistants	Mystical Creature	Stories
Ben	Jake and Tina	Solee	He is the last of his kind due to a deadly virus that has affected him as well. He carries an embryo in his lantern in order to restore his future race and to keep it from getting exposed to the same virus.
Melissa	Lex and Chaz	Abernash	He has the Elixir of Life which enables anyone to live for 100 years until the character gives up to another character before it absorbs their lifeforce.
Robert	Ivonne and Russ	Vlorkof	He comes from the treacherous foothill of the Dark Mountains. He carries a little chest containing a crystal ball where he must find the person that can gain control of its power before it destroys his kind.

- Airdate: May 13, 2014
- Creature Brief: After seeing Brian Henson in his office one-by-one, the final three receiving help from the eliminated contestants (sans Josh) as they face their toughest challenge which is to design, build, and perform a full-bodied mystical creature that meets other creatures at a tavern at the mystical crossroads to tell their stories. They also have to make some props associated with their creature and also perform some special effect. Peter Brooke, Julie Zobel, and John Criswell mentors each of the teams. Lisa Henson appears in the audience with the mentors, family members, and members of The Jim Henson Company. Alice Dinnean, Drew Massey, Michael Oosterom, Michelan Sisti, Allan Trautman, and Victor Yerrid are the featured puppeteers.
  - Winner: Robert

== Reception ==
=== Reviews ===
In a review of the series' premiere episode, Newsday rated it with an A−, saying: "We don't just watch art being made, we come to understand the process." Entertainment Weekly awarded it an "A" rating, calling it "Wildly refreshing…" and saying "...you've never seen a reality show like this." While TV Guide's Matt Roush complained the series often felt like a copy of Face Off, he concluded: "What Creature Shop may lack in originality it makes up for in creative energy. The climactic "Screen Test" reveals are fun to watch, and the critiques are smartly constructive."

=== Ratings ===
Upon its premiere on March 25, 2014, Jim Henson's Creature Shop Challenge became Syfy's highest-rated unscripted premiere among Adults 25-54 since July 2013. During the premiere broadcast, the series averaged 1.12 million total viewers, excluding DVR viewing. Proving especially strong among female demographics, the series was Syfy's highest-rated Tuesday night reality premiere ever among Women 25–54.
