= Judas Kiss (2011 film) =

2011 film by J. T. Tepnapa

- Official movie poster
- Directed by: J.T. Tepnapa
- Written by: Carlos Pedraza
- Produced by: Carlos Pedraza; Jody Wheeler (co-producer)
- Starring: Charlie David; Richard Harmon; Sean Paul Lockhart; Timo Descamps
- Cinematography: David Berry
- Edited by: Whitney Dunn
- Music by: Brad Anthony Laina
- Production companies: Blue Seraph Productions, Border2Border Entertainment
- Distributed by: Wolfe Video (N. America)
- Release dates: April 1, 2011 (United States); August 11, 2011 (Canada); October 16, 2011 (Germany); September 30, 2011 (Sweden); November 21, 2011 (Belgium)
- Running time: 94 minutes
- Country: United States
- Language: English
- Budget: $500,000

Judas Kiss is a 2011 American drama film directed by J.T. Tepnapa and written by Tepnapa and Carlos Pedraza. It stars Charlie David, Richard Harmon, Sean Paul Lockhart, and Timo Descamps. The film is the story of a disillusioned filmmaker's visit to his peculiar alma mater, where he is trapped in a tug of war between his tortured past and a troubling future.

Judas Kiss is the feature film directorial debut of J.T. Tepnapa, who has won many international awards for his short films, including the multiple award-winning parody of 1950s teen health films.

== Plot ==
Failed filmmaker Zach Wells is asked by his friend and hotshot director, Topher Shadoe, to take his place as judge in the annual Keystone Film Festival, held in Zach's alma mater, Keystone Summit University. Zach is initially reluctant, as it brings memories of the festival defining his life for the worse: he won the festival 15 years ago, which convinced him to drop out of college and move to Hollywood, where his career struggled. The night before the judging, Zach goes to a gay bar where he meets a younger man, having sex with in his room.

To his shock, Zach finds out that the patron is a participant in the festival. Even more puzzling, he is named Danny Reyes, Zach's birth name, and submits Judas Kiss, the same film Zach submitted years ago. Zach suspects it as Topher's elaborate joke, but it becomes more and more real as the headmistress, Mrs. Blossom, dismisses his misgivings about Danny's identity. Zach is approached by Welds, the school's elderly security guard. Welds seems to understand the situation and tips him that Danny, with the help of his friend Abbey Park, cheats in order to increase his chance of winning the competition. He tells Zach that the latter's future depends on whether Danny wins or not.

Danny strikes a relationship with Chris Wachowsky, the winner of the previous year's festival. As he is preparing for the big day, he is approached by Shane Lyons, the son of famous Hollywood producers and self-proclaimed "emperor" of the college. Shane takes an interest in Danny and has sex with him, asking him to move to his residence regardless if he wins the festival or not. Chris warns Danny that Shane is only interested in him because he is a potential winner and will dump him – just as he did to Chris a year ago – if his parents disapprove of his film. However, Danny is insistent about Shane's involvement as his abusive father, Daniel Sr., threatened to cut him off if he shows the film, straining his relationship with Chris and Abbey.

On the day of the awards ceremony, Zach presents evidence of Danny's deception to Daniel Sr., who in turn gives it to Mrs. Blossom. He tries to convince Danny to quit the festival, but the latter brushes him off. Welds appears one last time to Zach and reveals that he is actually Danny – and by extension Zach – as an old man. Danny's fraud costs him the award, but the other judges' assertions win him chance to play Judas Kiss, an autobiography of Danny's abusive life after his mother died. He is given special recognition, but this ends his friendship with Chris and Abbey for good. Danny visits Zach in his apartment and shares his fears. Zach tells him that what already happened cannot change, encouraging him to craft a better life.

After the festival, Zach is working on his project while sitting on a roof, like he did in the beginning. Topher returns from his business and joins him. It is revealed that Topher is really Chris, having reconciled with Zach after the latter failed to break into Hollywood.

== Cast ==
- Charlie David as Zachary "Zach" Wells
- Richard Harmon as Daniel "Danny" Reyes, Jr.
- Sean Paul Lockhart as Chris Wachowsky
- Timo Descamps as Shane Lyons
- Julia Morizawa as Abbey Park
- Ron Boyd as Ralph Garlington
- Troy Fischnaller as Topher Shadoe
- Samantha Rund as Rebecca Lynn
- Ronee Collins as Kimberly Reyes
- Laura Kenny as Mrs. Blossom
- Dale Bowers as Old Man Welds
- Vince Valenzuela as Daniel Reyes, Sr.
- Matt Smith as Jude
- Tim Foutch as Tommy
- Julian LeBlanc as Nate
- Genevieve Buechner as Samantha

== Production ==
The film is produced by Blue Seraph Productions, a Los Angeles company headed by Tepnapa and Pedraza. Their previous work has been featured in The New York Times, BBC, Variety, Frontiers, Fab, the Today Show, MSNBC, and other international news outlets.

The film, which was shot in the summer of 2010 in Seattle, has already attracted attention for casting former Dante's Cove star Charlie David. Also cast is adult film star Brent Corrigan (credited as Sean Paul Lockhart), who appeared in 2008's Oscar-winning Milk and the comedy Another Gay Sequel.

The Campus of the University of Washington was used as the Keystone Summit University.

=== Casting ===
Lockhart impressed the director with his acting in In the Closet. David is well known at the gay box office. Richard Harmon won the role over more than 1,000 Los Angeles actors when his video taped audition impressed the producers.

Belgian actor Timo Descamps approached the project's producers after seeing a casting notice online. In addition to the acting, he saw the film as an opportunity to feature his musical talents to a new audience. Patti Carns Kalles was hired to handle the Seattle, Washington casting.

== Soundtrack ==
Judas Kiss

Soundtrack album by Brad Anthony Laina
- Released: February 28, 2012
- Genre: Soundtrack

The 'Original Motion Picture Soundtrack for Judas Kiss featuring selections from the score by Seattle composer Brad Anthony Laina, the album also showcases independent artists who contributed their work to the film's soundtrack.

1. Crash, by Brian Lam
2. Analog Girl, by Oak & Gorski
3. Stereotype, by Mayda
4. Like It Rough, by Timo Descamps
5. Confrontation, by Brad Anthony Laina
6. Stimulate, by Ikonik
7. Zach's Lament, by David Yancey
8. Who Am I?, by Brad Anthony Laina
9. Key to the Future, Brad Anthony Laina
10. Judas Kiss, Brad Anthony Laina
11. If I Fall (Cast Recording, featuring Brian Lam and Brad Anthony Laina), by Brian Lam
12. If I Fall (Original Artist), by Brian Lam

== Reception ==
In its first week of release on DVD in the United States and Canada, the "bewitching Judas Kiss" made No. 1 on The Advocate's Hot Sheet, the top 10 entertainment highlights by Brandon Voss. Entertainment Focus named Judas Kiss to list Top 10 Gay Films of 2011.

QX Magazine rated Judas Kiss 7 out of 10, praising the film's nicely breezy tone. The review makes note of the film's "darker story elements, [which] make us wonder how our lives would look to our younger selves." Edge magazine named Judas Kiss among the "12 Great Gay Indies That Will (Hopefully) Make it to a Theater Near You."

ATV Today gave a positive review and said "A refreshingly different film with its genre mixing feel – time travel, fantasy, romance – and is at times dark but compelling, too". The revitalized GLBT news blog, Queerty, put Judas Kiss at the top of its list of 10 recommended films to see at this year's.

Helge Janssen of Artslink praised the "flawless ensemble acting", calling it the “primary satisfying energy that carries this film.” Queer.de weighed in on the film, calling it "a touching love story, beautifully photographed and filled with magnificent, gorgeous-looking actors." The review credits J.T. Tepnapa's direction, discusses the breakout performance by Sean Paul Lockhart in his dramatic role and notes the acclaim the film has received in film festivals all this year. Xtra! describes the film as a "spiritual journey of destiny, paths missed and second chances," which "emphasizes healing from your past." The Cinemanía blog in Spain calls Judas Kiss "so strange it's impossible not to love it." New York Cool said "Suspenseful. Spellbinding, with sexual swagger."

=== Awards ===
Sean Paul Lockhart won QFest's Rising Star Award in recognition of his transition to mainstream roles.

Year	Category	Recipient(s)	Result
TLA Gaybie Awards
2011	Best Drama	"Judas Kiss"	Won
2011	Best Lead Actor	Charlie David	Won
2011	Best Supporting Actor	Sean Paul Lockhart	Won
Q Cinema Festival
2011	Best Feature Debut	"Judas Kiss"	Won
Rhode Island International Film Festival
2011	First Place in the Alternative Spirit	"Judas Kiss"	Won
2011	Youth Jury Honorable Mention	"Judas Kiss"	Won
Long Beach QFilms Festival
2011	Best Screenplay Feature Film	"Judas Kiss"	Won
FilmOut San Diego
2011	Best Screenwriting	"Judas Kiss"	Won
