= Charlie David =

Canadian actor, writer, director and producer

- Born: Charles David Lubiniecki; August 9, 1980 (age 46); Regina, Saskatchewan, Canada
- Other name: Charlie Lubiniecki
- Occupations: actor, director, producer, narrator
- Years active: 2002–present
- Website: https://www.border2border.ca/

Charles David Lubiniecki (born August 9, 1980) is a Canadian actor, writer, director and producer, best known for the male lead in the LGBT horror series Dante's Cove. He has also worked as a TV host on a number of shows like F.Y.E!, SpyTV, Bump! and Crash Test Mommy.

He is the owner of Border2Border Entertainment, a production company of film, television, digital media and audio projects.

== Biography ==
Charlie David was born in Regina, Saskatchewan, and raised in Yorkton. His family is of Polish origin. During high school, David performed in the musical group Saskatchewan Express, a touring youth show. In 2000, he graduated from the Canadian College of Performing Arts in Victoria, British Columbia.

He then moved on to co-found the boy band 4Now, in which he played piano. The band performed around Canada and the United States and opened for acts including Destiny's Child, The Black Eyed Peas, and Pink. The band released two recordings. Derek James, later to play opposite David in the film Mulligans, was also in the band.

David later turned his attention to hosting and acting. He hosted for E! Television, NBC, OUTtv, here! TV, Pink TV, EGO, and Life Network on such shows as F.Y.E! in 2002, SpyTV in 2001, Bump! in 2005–2012 and Crash Test Mommy in 2004–2005.

He appeared in the mini-series Terminal City in 2005 and received second billing in the gay movie A Four Letter Word (2007) and Kiss the Bride (2008).

David played the lead character of Toby in the LGBT horror series Dante's Cove. His character was portrayed in a monogamous and loving relationship with boyfriend Kevin (Gregory Michael). David said in an interview, "What was attractive [about the role] was for me to portray a gay relationship, in which it's not always a different guy every night. Many gays and lesbians do pursue—and have—loving relationships in which we are very committed to each other. I think that is what Toby brings to the show. He is kind of a voice of reason, and has a definite dedication to his boyfriend."

David has consciously chosen to be "out" as a gay man in his personal life and career.

David wrote the novel and screenplay and starred in the film Mulligans, which had its premiere at the Inside Out Film and Video Festival in Toronto in May 2007. Mulligans explores the theme of what happens to individuals and their families when a young man and his friend's father "come out".

In addition to the screenplay for Mulligans, David has also published a novelization of the film (2009, ISBN 978-1928662198), as well as the novel Boy Midflight (2009, ISBN 9781928662181) and the short story collection Shadowlands (2010, ISBN 978-0982767603).

David starred in the independent film Judas Kiss as Zachary Wells, a washed-up filmmaker who returns to his peculiar alma mater, where he meets his younger self and gets the chance to change his troubled past so he can avoid a disturbing future.

In 2012 and 2013, David produced two documentaries, I'm a Stripper, which he also wrote and directed, and Positive Youth, about young people living with HIV.

In 2016, David directed and produced a new documentary I'm a Porn Star: Gay4Pay. It's a documentary about straight men who go gay-for-pay and answers questions like: "What motivates straight men to do gay porn?" and "Why might gay people be turned off if the man on screen looks, sounds, or behaves in a way that is identifiably queer?".

David currently lives in Montreal with his partner Patrick Ware.

== Filmography ==
=== Producer ===
- 2004: Is He... (short) (associate producer)
- 2008: Mulligans (executive producer, producer)
- 2008: For My Wife... (documentary) (executive producer)
- 2009: Beyond Gay: The Politics of Pride (documentary) (executive producer)
- 2009–2012: Bump! (TV series) (associate producer)
- 2011: Judas Kiss (executive producer)
- 2012: Positive Youth (writer, director, producer)
- 2013: I'm a Stripper (writer, director, producer)
- 2013: I'm a Porn Star
- 2016: I'm a Porn Star: Gay4Pay (director, producer)
- 2018: Drag Heals (director, producer)

=== Actor ===
Year	Title	Role	Note
2002	Holy Terror	David	
2002	Time Machine: St. Peter – The Rock	St. James	TV movie
2003	The Sparky Chronicles: The Map	Hippie	
2004	Is He...	Jake	
2005	Reefer Madness: The Movie Musical	Male Dancer	
2005	Playing the Role	The Actor	
2005	Terminal City	Rick	TV series
2005 - 2007	Dante's Cove	Toby	TV series
2006	The L Word	Speed Dater	TV series
2006	Godiva's	Attractive Man	TV series
2006	Ugly Betty	Scott	TV series
2007	A Four Letter Word	Stephen	
2007	Kiss the Bride	Joey	
2008	Mulligans	Chase Rousseau	
2010	2 Frogs in the West	Brett	
2010	Judas Kiss	Zachary Wells	
2014	More Scenes from a Gay Marriage		
2015	Paternity Leave	Ken	
2018	Shadowlands	Rudy	2 Episodes
2019	Fak Yaass	Cousin #1	

== Awards ==
David was honored by Out Magazine as one of the "Out 100" for Remarkable Contributions to Gay Culture in 2005.
