= Tampa International Gay and Lesbian Film Festival =

LGBTQ film festival in Florida, USA

The Tampa International Gay and Lesbian Film Festival is a movie screening event that takes place each October in Tampa, Florida. The primary venue is the Tampa Theatre, but several other cinemas in or near the downtown area and in St. Petersburg simultaneously host the event as well. While most of the films focus on homosexual themes, some films explore other areas of human sexuality including transgender issues and gender roles.

== Mission statement ==
The mission of the Tampa International Gay and Lesbian Film Festival is to, "continually showcase selections of compelling film and relevant digital media that Entertain, Empower, and Enlighten a diverse audience by, for or regarding the LGBT community and its supporters through the sharing of personal experiences surrounding thoughtful discussion".

== History ==
The Tampa International Gay and Lesbian Film Festival (TIGLFF) was founded in 1989 by representatives of several groups: The Tampa Bay Business Guild (TBBG), the Bay Area Human Rights Coalition, and the Tampa Bay Gay Men's Chorus. Started in 1990 as a 3-day extension of Tampa's gay pride celebrations, the festival grew to become the fifth largest gay and lesbian film festival in the United States. After the 1999 festival, the festival's core team of volunteers organized themselves as the Friends of the Festival, Inc., a nonprofit 501c(3) entity.

Friends of the Festival now produces year-round programming, which includes a Film Series from January through August, year-round outreach screenings, and the Tampa International Gay and Lesbian Film Festival in October.

Much of the success of the Film Festival continues to be driven by a large pool of volunteers who carry out a multitude of festival tasks, which include major fund raisers, screenings, a committee to preview and select films with the Programming Director, staffing of multiple events throughout the Film Festival, post festival wrap-up, reporting, and updating of the database.

In November 2006, Chuck Henson was hired as executive director. He departed following the successful conclusion of the Festival's 20th anniversary in December 2009. The current executive director is Larry Biddle

In 2009, Friends of the Festival established its first endowment trust: the Friends of the Festival Fund, which was created with a gift of $151k from the estate of Alan Dusowitz. The endowment fund is managed by the Tampa Community Foundation.

== 2007 Event ==
For the 2007 event, seventy films from more than 20 countries were included in the line-up of the 18th annual Tampa International Gay and Lesbian Film Festival. The festival ran for 11 days.

Additional events related to the annual film festival include, the Presidents Reception (Opening Night), Festival Gala, Frisky Friday (Women's) Party, Saturday Surge (Men's) Party, Festival Awards Brunch, and Business Guild Expo. Additionally a "festival" atmosphere is maintained outside the Tampa Theatre throughout the event.

== 2012 Event ==
For the 23rd Annual Film Festival, held October 5–13, 2012, films were presented both at the historic Tampa Theatre and the Muvico Baywalk in St. Petersburg. The opening night film was Elliot Loves directed by Terracino. The closing night film was Love or Whatever directed by Rosser Goodman.

The 23rd Annual Festival Jury were: Sammy South, Chip Duckett, Gina Vivinetto, Victoria Jorgensen, Jim Harper, T. Hampton Dohrman and Margaret Murray.

The First Annual Distinguished Friend of the Festival Award was presented to the Krewe of Cavaliers.

== 2013 Event ==
For the 24th Annual Film Festival, held October 4–12, 2013, films were presented both at the historic Tampa Theatre and the Muvico Baywalk in St. Petersburg. The opening night film was The Happy Sad directed by Rodney Evans. The closing night film was G.B.F. directed by Darren Stein.

The 24th Annual Festival Jury were: Justin Batten, Joseph Faura, Jodine Gordon, Sunny Hall, Jennifer Hsu, Gary Hess, Dean Otto and Paula Peterson.

The Second Annual Distinguished Friend of the Festival Award was presented to Eunice Fisher.

Festival Award Winners for the 24th Annual Tampa International Gay and Lesbian Film Festival:

The Alan Ira Dusowitz Emerging Filmmaker Awards

Short Film: Rafael Aidar for The Package (O Pacote)
Feature Film: Chris Mason Johnson for Test

Audience Awards

Best Short: Stop Calling Me Honey Bunny by Gabrielle Zilkha
Best Feature: Reaching for the Moon by Bruno Barreto

Jury Awards

Women's Shorts: Winner - Annalyn by Markia Erikson. Runner Up: Performing Girl by Crescent Diamond & First Date by Janella Lacson.
Men's Shorts: Winners (tie) - The Package (O Pacote) by Rafael Aidar & Holden by Roque Madrid. Runner Up - Dik by Christopher Stollery.
Documentary Feature: Winner - God Loves Uganda by Roger Ross Williams. Runner Up: Bridegroom by Linda Bloodworth Thomason.
Narrative Feature: Winners (tie) - The Last Match (La Partida) by Antonio Hens & MIA by Javier Van de Couter. Runner Up: Out in the Dark by Michael Myers.

== Attendance ==
The films, events, and videos draws approximately 8,000 people, making it one of the country's largest and longest-running independent gay film festivals.

== New name ==
At the conclusion of the 2007 event, Festival Organizers announced a re-branding of the annual event. The new name, Clip Film Festival also has several other iterations that capture the other year-round film events produced by Friends of the Festival, Inc., including Clip Film Series and Clip Film Outreach. The new brand was abandoned at the conclusion of the 2008 festival due to possible copyright issues with an existing holder of a similar brand. In 2009 the Festival returned to its original "Tampa International Gay and Lesbian Film Festival" name.
