= Star Trek fan productions =

Fan created Star Trek media

Star Trek fan productions are productions made by fans using elements of the Star Trek franchise. Paramount Pictures, CBS, and their licensees are the only organizations legally allowed to create commercial products with the Star Trek name and trademark. The fan film community has received some coverage from the mainstream media.

== Films ==
=== Paragon's Paragon (1974) ===
Star Trek fan films have been made since the 1960s by individuals and various fan groups but, before the advent of inexpensive digital cameras, editing and effects in the 1990s, most were on a simple home movie level. An early effort to achieve something more was John Cosentino's Paragon's Paragon, which was an unofficial adaptation of James Blish's Spock Must Die!, an early Star Trek spinoff novel. The film ran for an hour and was shot on 16mm film using a full-size recreation of the Bridge set. It also used a wide variety of film special effects techniques on a budget of over $2,000 ($13,000 in 2025 dollars) and received considerable coverage in Don Dohler's Cinemagic magazine for low budget filmmakers. Dohler subsequently used its crew to make his first feature film, The Alien Factor (1978).

=== Star Trek: Of Gods and Men (2007–2008) ===
A three-part mini-series directed by Tim Russ and starring several original Star Trek stars, including Nichelle Nichols and Walter Koenig. The first part was released in December 2007; parts 2 and 3 were released in 2008.

=== Star Trek: Axanar (2014) ===
In 2014, fans and former cast members organized a fan-made short film called Prelude to Axanar, setting up a Kickstarter project with a target of $10,000, but which raised well over $100,000 instead. This short film was to be followed by a full-length feature film called Star Trek: Axanar, funded by a much larger Kickstarter project. Both films were to star Richard Hatch, J. G. Hertzler, Kate Vernon, Gary Graham, Michael Hogan, and Tony Todd, all mainstream actors who were veterans of Paramount's Star Trek franchise and the rebooted Battlestar Galactica. Prelude to Axanar featured both new and familiar characters from the Star Trek universe:

- Richard Hatch as Kharn, the Klingon Supreme Commander
- Michael Hogan As Captain Robert April
- J. G. Hertzler as Captain Samuel Travis
- Gary Graham as Soval, Vulcan Ambassador to the Federation

The short film for Prelude to Axanar was released in June 2014. In August 2014, the production raised $638,000 on Kickstarter, and writer-producer Alec Peters went into pre-production for the feature film Star Trek: Axanar.

On December 29, 2015 the project was hit by a lawsuit from CBS and Paramount Pictures filed in Central California federal court, stating the Axanar works infringed upon their intellectual property by making use of "innumerable copyrighted elements of Star Trek, including its settings, characters, species, and themes." In March 2016, Peters' Axanar Productions filed a motion to dismiss or strike Paramount and CBS's claims, saying the elements mentioned in the court filing are not protected by copyright and is seeking premature relief from a work, the Axanar feature film, that does not exist. The motion to dismiss or strike was denied by the court and the case went to a jury trial in January 2017. On January 21, 2017, the lawsuit was settled.

On June 26, 2016, during the Axanar lawsuit, CBS and Paramount released a set of guidelines for Star Trek fan films to follow. Notably, these restrictions require films to: be no more than 15 minutes long and have no stories longer than two installments (for a total of 30 minutes); play on YouTube without commercials; and all participants are required to be amateurs who have never worked on Star Trek or another licensee of CBS or Paramount Pictures. The creation and release of Axanar would only be allowed on these terms.

=== Star Trek: Renegades (2015) ===
Star Trek: Renegades is a fan-created project to create a pilot for a new Star Trek series. CBS declined to pick up the show. Several former Star Trek actors appear, including Walter Koenig, Robert Picardo, Manu Intiraymi, and Tim Russ. It is set 10 years after Voyager's return from the Delta Quadrant. Plans have been announced for a Renegades web based series. In June 2016, the team announced that in response to new requirements on Star Trek fan films issued by CBS and Paramount Pictures, their upcoming film Requiem would remove all references to Star Trek. The series itself was renamed Renegades.

=== Star Trek: Horizon (2016) ===
Star Trek: Horizon is set in Star Trek: Enterprise era, directly after the 4th season of the series. The film is about the Romulan War. The Kickstarter campaign launched on April 19, 2014. The film was released February 25, 2016 to backers and was also on the internet.

In April 2016, co-producer Tommy Kraft issued the following regarding a proposed follow up production. Star Trek - Horizon sequel, Federation Rising, shut down.

"Earlier today, executives from CBS reached out to me and advised me that their legal team strongly suggested that we do not move forward with plans to create a sequel to Horizon. While this is a sign of the current climate that we find ourselves in with Star Trek fan films, I want to personally thank CBS for reaching out to me, rather than including us in their ongoing lawsuit against Axanar.

"It was conveyed that the reason CBS was reaching out to me was due to the legal troubles stemming from the Axanar case. Again, CBS did not have to reach out personally. The message I received felt more like they were giving me a heads up before we got too involved in another project, rather than a group of angry executives swinging a hammer.

"On behalf of myself and Ryan Webber, my co-writer and co-producer on Federation Rising, we appreciate your initial support and are saddened that we cannot bring you what we believe was a fantastic feature film. However, rest assured that Ryan and I are committed to continuing our storytelling partnership with an original project. We also welcome other fan productions and fan film lovers to join us on this new venture.

"While we initially planned to debut our Kickstarter for Federation Rising this Saturday, we hope that you will instead stand with us as we announce an original sci-fi project that Ryan and I have been co-developing in addition to Federation Rising. We’re incredibly excited to tell you about this completely original story that follows the ideals set forth by Star Trek that Ryan and I have been such huge fans and admirers of our entire lives."

- Tommy Kraft, Star Trek: Horizon creator

==== Awards ====
Star Trek: Horizon won four of twelve categories in the 2017 Independent Star Trek Fan Film Awards (Best Special & Visual Effects; Best Original Music; Best Original Story or Screenplay; and Best Dramatic Presentation, Long Form), presented at and by Treklanta.

=== What We Left Behind (2019) ===
In 2017, eighteen years after the airing of the Deep Space Nine finale, "What You Leave Behind," Ira Steven Behr announced a crowdfunded documentary named What We Left Behind, deriving its title from the name of this episode (which itself is based on the Pericles quote, "What you leave behind is not what is engraved in stone monuments, but what is woven into the lives of others"). The documentary, which met its goal of $150,000 within 24 hours, reflects on Star Trek: Deep Space Nine's legacy, featuring interviews with the cast and crew of the series and speculating on what would have happened had there been an eighth season. It was released in 2019. The cast includes Alexander Siddig, Avery Brooks, Colm Meaney, Michael Dorn, Nana Visitor, Rene Auberjonois, and Terry Farrell.

== Series ==
=== Star Trek: Hidden Frontier (2000–2007) ===
A series with fifty produced episodes, the series is set shortly after the end of the Dominion War and centers on the starship Excelsior and its home base, Deep Space 12, as they mediate disputes between various races and fend off attacks from a powerful new alien race, the Grey. Fan Films Quarterly listed Hidden Frontier as one of the ten most pivotal moments in fan film history in its Summer 2006 issue. The BBC in 2006 called the series "the most prominent" Star Trek fan film following Star Trek: Enterprise's cancellation. Hidden Frontier spawned several spinoffs: four live-actions series (Voyages of the USS Angeles- prequel, Star Trek: Odyssey, The Helena Chronicles, and Federation One), the 23rd-century movie era audio series Star Trek: Grissom, two 24th-century audio series (Henglaar, M.D. and Diplomatic Relations), and three videos made jointly with Starship Intrepid Productions.

=== Starship Exeter (2002–2014) ===
An online series produced by Jimm and Joshua Johnson that focuses on the adventures of the Constitution-class starship USS Exeter (NCC-1706), a sister ship of the USS Enterprise (NCC-1701) in the original series era, with production design matching the era. It has been mentioned by The New York Times and Register-Guard (Oregon). Two episodes were released.

James Cawley as Kirk in Star Trek: Phase II.

=== Star Trek: New Voyages (2004–2016) ===
(formerly known as Star Trek: Phase II)

Co-creators James Cawley and Jack Marshall aimed to complete the original series' five-year mission, with actors cast as Kirk, Spock and the rest of the Enterprise crew on an exact replica of the original bridge set. One episode, "To Serve All My Days," was written by D. C. Fontana, story editor on the original Star Trek series, and featured Walter Koenig guest-starring as an older version of Pavel Chekov, his character from the original series. Several other actors from the original Trek series have also now signed on to appear in future episodes. George Takei reprised his role of Hikaru Sulu in the third episode, "World Enough and Time," joining the original Yeoman Janice Rand, Grace Lee Whitney. Fan Films Quarterly listed New Voyages as one of the ten most pivotal moments in fan film history in its Summer 2006 issue, and it has been reported on by National Public Radio. New Voyages also won TV Guide's 2007 Online Video Award for best sci-fi Webisode. On February 16, 2008, during an appearance at the Farpoint Science Fiction Media Convention in Baltimore, Maryland, James Cawley announced that the series would shed the New Voyages moniker and become known as Star Trek: Phase II to reflect the transition between the original series and Star Trek: The Motion Picture. 10 episodes and 3 short vignettes have been released by 2015.

=== Star Trek: Odyssey (2007-2011) ===
A spin-off from the Hidden Frontier team with its first episode "Illiad" launched in September 2007. It is the story of the USS Odyssey, a Federation ship which has become trapped in the distant Andromeda Galaxy. With Odyssey's captain and first officer dead, along with most of the command staff, Lt. Commander Ro Nevin is forced to take command in order to get the remaining crew home.

=== Star Trek: Intrepid (2007-2018) ===
A U.K. based fanfilm, and the first such production from Scotland, Intrepid is set in the 24th century, several years after Star Trek: Nemesis, and revolves around the effort to colonise a distant and largely unexplored sector of the galaxy. Star Trek: Intrepid was filmed entirely in Scotland and was released on May 26, 2007. GMTV presenter Lorraine Kelly has a brief appearance in Intrepid and the production has received extensive coverage in both national and international media, such as CNN, BBC Radio Scotland The Guardian, and The Scotsman. Intrepid was featured on the UK Sci Fi Channel's Sci Fi 360 video podcast. Executive Producer and cast member Nick Cook has also collaborated with the Hidden Frontier crew several times, including the joint episodes Orphans of War and Operation Beta Shield, as well as the finale of Odyssey.

=== Star Trek Continues (2013–2017) ===
First produced in 2013 by the Starship Farragut team, this series looks to chronicle the "lost seasons" of Star Trek: The Original Series (in similar fashion to Star Trek: Phase II; see below). The series features voice actors Vic Mignogna and Todd Haberkorn as Kirk and Spock, respectively. Other notable cast include Chris Doohan (son of James Doohan) as Scotty, as well as both author-producer Larry Nemecek and voice actor Chuck Huber as McCoy. It also co-stars Grant Imahara (MythBusters) as Sulu. The first episode, "Pilgrim of Eternity" (with Michael Forest reprising his role as Apollo from the original series episode "Who Mourns for Adonais?"), was released in 2013. The second episode, "Lolani" (featuring guest star Lou Ferrigno), was released in February 2014, and a third episode, "Fairest of Them All," was released in June 2014 and won a Burbank International Film Festival award for "Best New Media – Drama." Star Trek Continues also won a Geekie Award for "Best Web Series." On June 19, 2015, Episode 4 of the series was posted and titled "White Iris." All eleven full episodes have been released as of December 2017.

== Audio ==
=== Star Trek: The Continuing Mission ===
This independent production is the story of the USS Montana, a ship from the end of the era of "cowboy diplomacy" that travels seventy years into the future—into the new world of careful steps and slow deliberation. Flung to a new time and into a new culture, the crew of the Montana is forced to adapt—but this hardly stops them from facing new adventures in the 24th century. The pilot episode, "Ghost Ship," was released in December 2007, and since then seven more episodes have been released, that last was "Cathedral in the Void" on May 10, 2014.

=== Star Trek: Excelsior ===
Starship Excelsior has twice been nominated for the Parsec Awards for speculative fiction podcasting. The series concerns the 24th century adventures of the crew of the U.S.S. Excelsior (NCC-2000-C - the "fourth starship to bear the name") in the Delta Quadrant. Executive Producer James Heaney started the audio drama in 2007 as a means of recruiting players to a Star Trek play-by-forum role-playing game (RPG) set on the USS Excelsior-C. According to the show's website, "episodes are recorded in more than two dozen places on three continents," and by July 2010 voice actors in the US lived in nine different states while one resided in Australia and another in New Zealand. Original theme music was composed by Sam Gillis. Starship Excelsior was a Parsec Award nominee in 2010 and a finalist in 2011 for Best Speculative Fiction Audio Drama (Long Form).

== Parodies ==
=== Redshirt Blues ===
David Rogers' film presents the tale of a space weary security officer on the Enterprise who is sick of Kirk, the ship, and the red shirt he must wear every day. While on patrol, he meets another redshirt on his first assignment and to whom he reveals the truth about redshirts. This film was screened on the Sci Fi Channel's Exposure in 2001.

=== Star Trek: The Pepsi Generation ===
A 16-minute film written by Ryan K. Johnson and Darrell Bratz, with Johnson producing and directing. It primarily parodies Star Trek: The Next Generation, although it also pokes fun at Max Headroom, Doctor Who, William Shatner, and Harlan Ellison. The film premiered at the Norwescon science fiction convention in March 1988, and won best film at the convention's film festival.

In this 1988 film, the "Ferrari" have stolen all of the Pepsi from Starbase Seven-Up, and it is up to the crew of the Enterprise to rescue it. Captain Picard, along with Doodah the android, Ya Har, Jordashe, Rigor Mortis, Sexx Toii (the Betamax counselor), Ensign Expendable, and Weasley Crushme all leap into action. Along the way, viewers meet the harried Star Trek writing crew and the Ferrari's fearsome leader.

On August 26, 1996, the BBC aired a documentary on Star Trek parodies, and Star Trek: The Pepsi Generation was one of the featured films.

=== Stone Trek ===
A Flash animated series that presents episodes of Star Trek as it might have appeared on television in the universe of The Flintstones. The series was created by Brian Matthews with assistance of Jim Jenkins as writer and Wally Fields as voice talent and takes place aboard the stoneship USS Magnetize. Characters include Captain James T. Kirkstone, the Vulcano first officer Mr. Sprock, and ship's doctor Leonard "Fossils" RcKoy. The series also includes a running count of redshirts killed in each episode, and fans could write in to nominate themselves to be caricatured as a redshirt in future episodes. The production's website was a Sci-Fi.com "Site of the Week" in May 2001.

=== Steam Trek: The Moving Picture ===
A silent film showing a Star Trek episode as might have been made by François Méliès. Produced in 1994 and set in 1980, "hundreds of miles" out in space, a crisis besets the ship when it runs low on coal.

== Legal issues ==
The attitude of the Star Trek copyright and trademark holders toward fan works has varied over time. In early 1996, Viacom (which purchased Paramount in 1994) sent cease and desist letters to webmasters of Star Trek fan sites that contained copyrighted film clips, sounds, insignia, or other copyrighted material. In the lead-up to the release of Star Trek: First Contact, then-president of Paramount Digital Entertainment David Wertheimer stated that Viacom was targeting sites that were "selling ads, collecting fees, selling illegal merchandise or posting copyrighted materials." Under threat of legal action, many websites shut down.

Jennifer Granick, a San Francisco criminal lawyer who went on to champion cyber rights, felt that the unofficial sites should be covered by the fair use doctrine in U.S. copyright law. In 1998, then-UCLA associate professor Howard Besser claimed the entertainment industry as a whole was, and cited Viacom's actions toward Star Trek site webmasters as an example of, "exploiting concerns over digitization and attempting to reshape the law by strengthening protection for copyrights holders and weakening public rights to access and use material."

Star Trek fan films operated in an informational vacuum, since Paramount has made few official statements regarding their existence. Fan filmmakers have generally kept a low profile, hoping not to draw attention to themselves. However, with the demise of Star Trek: Enterprise in 2005, the fan film community began drawing more attention in the media, and even a certain amount of recognition from the entertainment industry.

Star Trek: Phase II, one fan series, has established an understanding that Paramount must be properly credited as the owner of Star Trek-related intellectual property.

On December 29, 2015 (weeks after announcing Star Trek: Discovery) CBS and Paramount Pictures filed a lawsuit in California federal court against Star Trek: Axanar stating the Axanar works infringed upon their intellectual property by making use of "innumerable copyrighted elements of Star Trek, including its settings, characters, species, and themes." In June 2016 Paramount issued guidelines to assist fan-made productions from litigation; in summary:

- Fan-made productions must be original stories and must be short (less than 30 minutes in total for a single storyline).
- Actors and other creative talent must be amateurs; they cannot be compensated for their work nor be previous employees of official Star Trek productions.
- The productions must be non-commercial. Crowd-sourced fundraising is permitted up to US$50,000, but distribution of fan-made works must be on a no-cost basis and must not generate revenue.
- Fan-made productions may not use bootleg props: on-screen props must be either fan-made or be official Star Trek merchandise.
- Fan-made productions must be family friendly; they may not include profanity, nudity, obscenity, pornography, or depictions of harmful or illegal activities such as use of illegal drugs.
- Fan-made productions must provide a disclaimer indicating that Star Trek intellectual property is owned solely by CBS Studios. Further, the guidelines restrict how the name Star Trek may be used in titling the production.

Because of the guidelines issued by Paramount as a result of the Axanar case, Star Trek: Renegades made changes to the script of their upcoming film Requiem to remove all references to Star Trek. The series itself was renamed Renegades.

== See also ==
- Fan film
- Fan labor
