= Pilgrim of Eternity =

- Star Trek Continues episode
- Michael Forest as Apollo
- Episode no.: Episode 1
- Directed by: Vic Mignogna
- Story by: Vic Mignogna & Jack Marshall
- Teleplay by: Steve Frattarola & Jack Treviño
- Cinematography by: Matt Bucy
- Original air date: May 26, 2013 (Phoenix Comicon)
- Running time: 51:18

Guest appearances
- Michael Forest - Apollo; Diana Hale - Athena; Doug Drexler - Paladin; Jamie Bamber - Mr. Simone; Marina Sirtis - Computer Voice

Episode chronology
← Previous —	Next → "Lolani"

"Pilgrim of Eternity" is a fan-produced Star Trek episode released in 2013, the first in the web series Star Trek Continues, which aims to continue the episodes of Star Trek: The Original Series replicating their visual and storytelling style. An unofficial sequel to the original 1967 TOS episode "Who Mourns for Adonais?", it was written by Steve Frattarola and Jack Treviño, from a story by Jack Marshall and Vic Mignogna and directed by Mignogna.

== Plot summary ==
The crew of the U.S.S. Enterprise are investigating mysterious energy drains from power stations, when they encounter an alien artifact, which begins to draw power from the ship. They are forced to destroy the artifact to save themselves, however Spock (Todd Haberkorn) detects two life forms on it.

The two forms then materialize on the bridge, one of which is the alien known historically as the Greek god Apollo (Michael Forest). The crew had previously dealt with him only a couple of years prior, but he has now aged significantly. He says he was exposed to the energy draining properties of the Realm, the destroyed structure, built to ensure immortality, but which had malfunctioned and killed all the others of his race. He professes at first to no longer wish to have humanity worship him again, but after a brief stay in the sickbay, begins to return to form and seek adulation for his singing and storytelling. When Captain Kirk (Vic Mignogna) demands to speak with him about his behaviors, he uses his psychic powers on the captain and others to try to enforce worship.

The new ship's counselor (Michele Specht), who had begun to be enamored of Apollo, fires a phaser at him to stop his endangering the captain's life. Apollo is taken to the sickbay again, this time under restraint. Spock surmises that Apollo is incapable of controlling his desire to be worshiped by force. Apollo surprises the crew by requesting that Dr. McCoy (Larry Nemecek) operate to remove the organ which gives his race the power to convert human worship to life energy. The operation is a success, but it leaves Apollo in a much weakened condition. No consensus can be made on his stated desire to live out his days on a planet of humans, with doubts remaining as to his actual intent.

Meanwhile, the remains of the Realm are still causing difficulties, which results in the loss of a crew member while he and Sulu (Grant Imahara) are removing debris from the hull of the Enterprise. Scotty comes up with a method to remove the remains, using an electromagnetic pulse, but while doing so, Uhura (Kim Stinger) is gravely wounded from an electrostatic shock, and dies while in sickbay. Apollo, witnessing this, gets up from his bed and places his hands over Uhura, and despite a warning from Spock to conserve his own energy, is able to return Uhura to life. Though he collapses upon completion, he recovers with more energy than he had prior to surgery.

Kirk, following a logical premise from Spock, surmises that the true source of Apollo's power may be in the act of sacrifice, which Apollo admits his race had never considered in all their centuries of forced worship from humans. The chief crew now agree to place Apollo on a planet with humanoid forms, at the approximate level of Earth's 14th century. After a humorous vignette with Kirk and McCoy teasing Spock about whether Apollo's race would have found the unemotional Vulcans to be as worthy of their attention as humans, the story jumps one year ahead, showing Apollo aiding the natives, with the last shot of him looking much younger, and without gray hair.

== Production and release ==
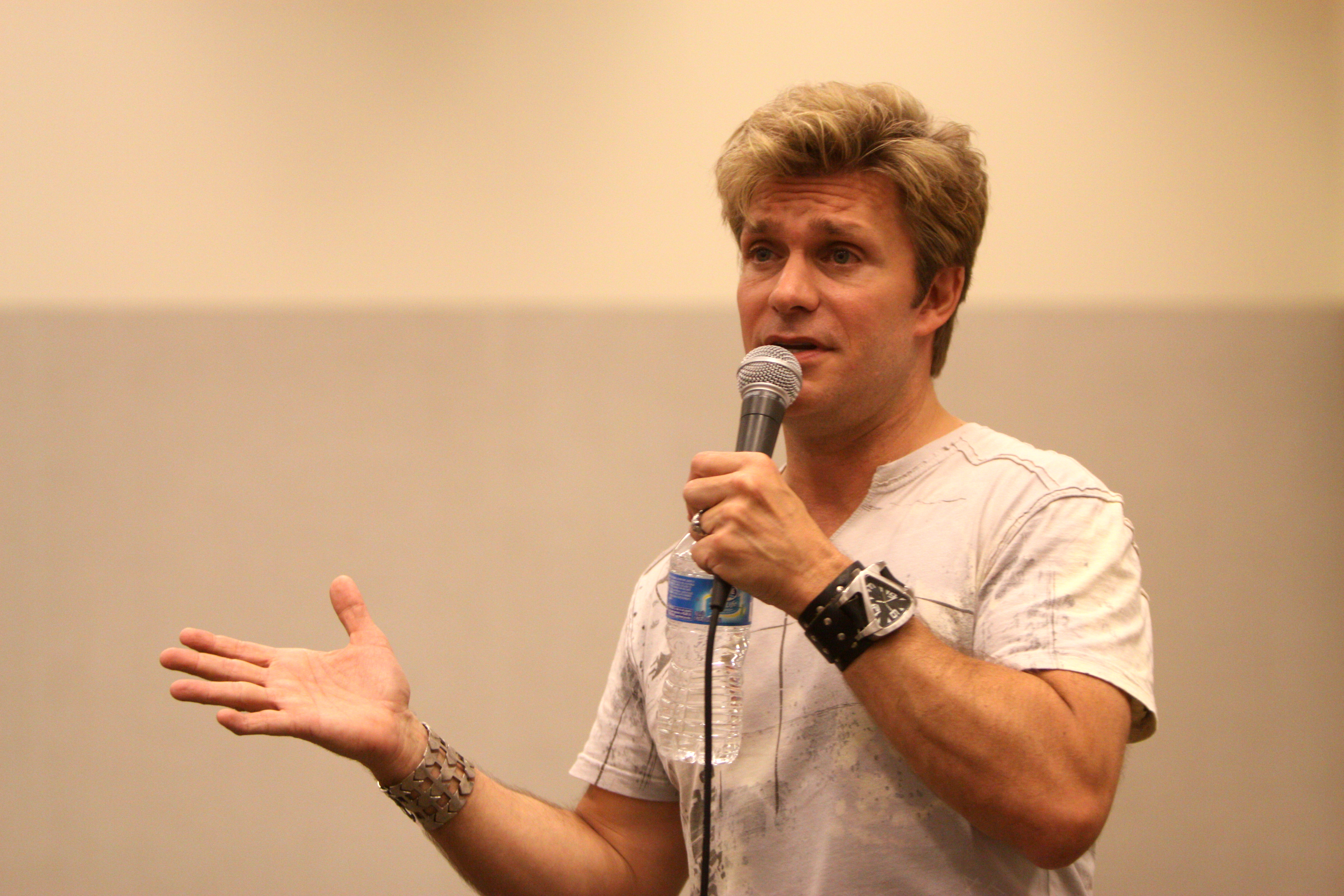
Director, co-writer and co-producer Vic Mignogna, who portrayed Captain Kirk in "Pilgrim"

As with all such Star Trek fan productions, permission to use copyrighted and trademarked properties from the original series was allowed so long as the production was not-for-profit.

The idea of creating an episode about Apollo came to Vic Mignogna when he remembered that, years before, actress BarBara Luna told him that actor Michael Forest would have been glad to act again in a Star Trek production. Mignogna asked the actor to reprise his role of Apollo in an unofficial sequel to "Who Mourns for Adonais?" and Forest liked the idea. Forest, in his 80s during filming, was included in the story as having been artificially aged, since he had last encountered the crew of the Enterprise only two years prior, according to the original series timeline.

The production of "Pilgrim of Eternity" was funded by Mignogna. Principal photography started in Los Angeles with exteriors and green screen, while photography of the Enterprise set followed at the Farragut Films facility in Kingsland, Georgia. On January 30, 2013, it was announced that the filming was completed.

Guest cast for this episode included:

- Michael Forest as Apollo
- Diana Hale as Athena (Hale is Michael Forest's real wife. Other onscreen work includes the 1974 TV series, Planet of the Apes)
- Doug Drexler as Paladin (Drexler is probably best known for his work as an award-winning visual effects artist on Star Trek as well as Battlestar Galactica (2004) and Defiance. Drexler also contributes VFX for Star Trek Continues. His role in this episode is a homage to the 1950s TV western series, Have Gun - Will Travel which starred Richard Boone as Paladin. Star Trek creator, Gene Roddenberry was a writer for this series. The dialogue delivered by Drexler was often spoken by Paladin in the series and his character's costume was also based on Boone's.)
- Jamie Bamber as Mr Simone (Bamber is best known as Lee "Apollo" Adama from Battlestar Galactica and Matt Devlin from Law and Order UK)
- Marina Sirtis as Enterprise Computer (Sirtis played Deanna Troi in Star Trek: The Next Generation, Star Trek: Voyager (3 episodes), Star Trek: Enterprise (1 episode), Star Trek: Picard (7 Episodes) and 4 Star Trek feature films. Her role is an homage to her connection to the original actress, Majel Barrett Roddenberry who portrayed her character's mother, Lwaxana Troi, in Star Trek: The Next Generation)

The episode was first shown to the public at the Phoenix Comicon on May 26, 2013, and was at the same time released onto the internet, on various streaming services, including YouTube and Vimeo. The Canadian theatrical premiere was on June 1, 2013 at the Lost Episode Festival Toronto.

== Reception ==
"Pilgrim of Eternity" has received very positive reviews, many of which highlighted the quality of the production. Slice of SciFi wrote: "They have certainly raised the bar for independent Star Trek episodic film making" and SyFy's Blastr wrote: "Lots of people try to make fan versions of Trek. None of them look like this." Other reviewers praised the resemblance between the episode and the original look-and-feel of TOS. Phil Plait wrote on Slate: "I have to say, I quite enjoyed this. The attention to detail is wonderful, and I really like the choice to film it in 4:3 format to maintain the feel, as well as the inspired decision to reuse the original music." while Lauren Davis wrote on io9: "Star Trek Continues goes to great effort to evoke the look and feel of the original series through the sets, sound, even the aspect ratio".

The episode won a Lost Episode Festival Toronto award in the category "Best Feature" and an award at the 71st World Science Fiction Convention in the category "Best Fan Film".

== See also ==
- Star Trek fan productions
- Adonaïs: An Elegy on the Death of John Keats, Author of Endymion, Hyperion, etc., epic 1821 poem by Percy Bysshe Shelley wherein Lord Byron is portrayed as the "Pilgrim of Eternity", the source of the episode's name
