= Doohan =

Doohan is an ancient Irish surname, its oldest origins are found on Tory Island, County Donegal, Ireland. There are various accounts of its origin; The Oxford Dictionary of Family Names of Ireland states that there are two origins. The first being that it is derived from Ó Duacháin, 'descendant of Duachán', a derivative of the early personal name Dui or Duach. The second that its origin is Ó Dubhchon, 'descendant of Dubhchú, a personal name meaning 'black hound'. According to The Tory Islanders, by anthropology professor Robin Fox, Doohan is the English translation of Dhubghain (dubh=black). The name is derived from Dubhgain (Duggan), where the 'g' is softened by a 'gh'. Notable people with the name include:

- Chris Doohan (born 1959), Canadian actor
- Hunter Doohan (born 1994), American actor
- Jack Doohan (born 2003), Australian racing driver
- Jack Doohan (politician) (1920–2007), Australian politician
- James Doohan (1920–2005), Irish-Canadian character and voice actor
- Mick Doohan (born 1965), Australian Grand Prix motorcycle road racing World Champion
- Peter Doohan (1961–2017), Australian tennis player
- Scott Doohan (born 1963), Australian Grand Prix motorcycle racer
