= Who Mourns for Adonais? =

- Star Trek: The Original Series episode
- Episode no.: Season 2 Episode 2
- Directed by: Marc Daniels
- Written by: Gilbert Ralston; Gene L. Coon
- Cinematography by: Jerry Finnerman
- Production code: 033
- Original air date: September 22, 1967

Guest appearances
- Michael Forest – Apollo; Leslie Parrish – Lt. Carolyn Palamas; John Winston – Lt. Kyle; Eddie Paskey – Lt. Leslie; William Blackburn – Lt. Hadley; Roger Holloway – Lt. Lemli

Episode chronology
← Previous "Amok Time"	Next → "The Changeling"
- Star Trek: The Original Series season 2

"Who Mourns for Adonais?" is the second episode of the second season of the American science fiction television series Star Trek. Written by Gilbert Ralston and Gene L. Coon, and directed by Marc Daniels, it was first broadcast September 22, 1967.

The title is in line 415 of the 1821 elegy Adonais (/ˌædoʊˈneɪ.ɪs/ add-oh-NEY-iss) by Percy Bysshe Shelley and roughly means "who mourns for gods?"

In the episode, the crew of the Enterprise are held captive by the Greek god Apollo.

== Plot ==
A huge energy field in the shape of a glowing green hand appears and grabs the USS Enterprise, halting its movement. Captain James T. Kirk tries to shake the ship free, but fails. A humanoid apparition appears on the bridge viewscreen and addresses the ship's crew. Kirk demands that the ship be set free, but the being responds by tightening its grip, threatening to crush the ship until Kirk agrees to the being's demand that the ship's crew be beamed down to the planet below.

Kirk leads a landing party that includes Lieutenant Carolyn Palamas (Leslie Parrish), whose specialties include Greek mythology. The team arrives at what appears to be an ancient Greek temple, where they encounter the humanoid who identifies himself as the god Apollo (Michael Forest). He informs the party that he will not allow them to leave, and renders their communicators and transporter nonfunctional. He indicates that he expects the crew of the Enterprise to worship him as their ancestors did, and in return promises to provide for all their needs and desires. Kirk refuses.

Apollo's attention shifts to Carolyn, angering Mr. Scott, who steps forward to defend her against Apollo's advances. Apollo destroys his phaser and announces he will take Carolyn as his consort. After displaying his power, Apollo appears tired, and vanishes along with Carolyn.

Kirk and McCoy speculate that their captor was one of a group of powerful aliens that visited Earth millennia ago and became objects of worship to the ancient Greeks. Chekov having noticed Apollo's fatigue, Kirk plans to provoke Apollo to test the limits of his power and allow the landing party to overcome him. Meanwhile, Carolyn learns that Apollo belonged to a group of travelers who subsist on love and worship. He is the last of their kind, the others having faded away over the eons.

Kirk's plan to provoke Apollo is frustrated when Carolyn intervenes to protect the landing party. Apollo instructs Kirk to begin making arrangements for the remaining crew to come down to the planet. Kirk takes Carolyn aside and tells her that she must reject Apollo to save them all from slavery. She reluctantly agrees.

Meanwhile, Mr. Spock locates the power source for the force field holding the Enterprise, and finds a way to communicate and fire phasers through it. Forced to prioritize responsibility over romantic desire, Carolyn, her heart in splinters, lies through her teeth and tells Apollo her interest in him is purely scientific, likening him to a new strain of bacteria. His feelings hurt, Apollo invokes a thunderstorm while Kirk orders Spock to fire on and destroy the power source.

Defeated, Apollo addresses his fellow gods, admitting that he was wrong, and begging to join them. He fades away. Carolyn is distraught. Kirk notes that humans owe their moral code to the Greek civilisation and mythology, and (along with McCoy) regrets having to destroy Apollo.

== Reception ==
Zack Handlen of The A.V. Club gave the episode a C+ rating, noting that it was occasionally memorable, but "undone by lazy scripting and bizarre dialogue".

In 2024 Hollywood.com ranked this episode at number 37 out of the 79 original series episodes.

== Cultural references ==
The title derives from the first line of verse XLVII of Adonais.

The title is a quotation from the poem Adonais by Percy Shelley lamenting the death of John Keats, which is loosely based upon A Lament for Adonis by the Greek poet Bion.

The song "Who Mourns for Adonais" was recorded by The Vulcan Dub Squad.

The episode is featured in the 2016 film X-Men: Apocalypse, shown playing on a TV in the mutant Storm's apartment. The film features an ancient mutant, once worshipped as a god, who seeks to return to power, mirroring the plot of the episode.

== See also ==
- "How Sharper Than a Serpent's Tooth" – An episode of the animated Star Trek series about an alien that had long ago visited Earth and now demands worship as a god by the Enterprise crew.
- Star Trek: New Frontier, a series of novels written by Peter David. One of the characters, Mark McHenry, is a descendant of Apollo. (In the novelization of the episode, but cut from the final shooting script, Carolyn Palamas is pregnant with Apollo's child, whom she names Athena. Athena is McHenry's grandmother.)
- In the photonovel Star Trek: New Visions issue #11 "Of Woman Born", John Byrne retells the episode's ending and continues with the events during Palamas's pregnancy.
- The first episode of Star Trek Continues, "Pilgrim of Eternity", was a 2013 fan-based sequel to the episode. In it, Forest reprised his role as an elderly Apollo who asks the Enterprise crew for help.

External videos
- Apollo's green hand, YouTube video

- Apollo's "green hand" is mentioned in dialogue in Star Trek Beyond as well as being seen in the movie's credits.
