= Doug Drexler =

American sculptor

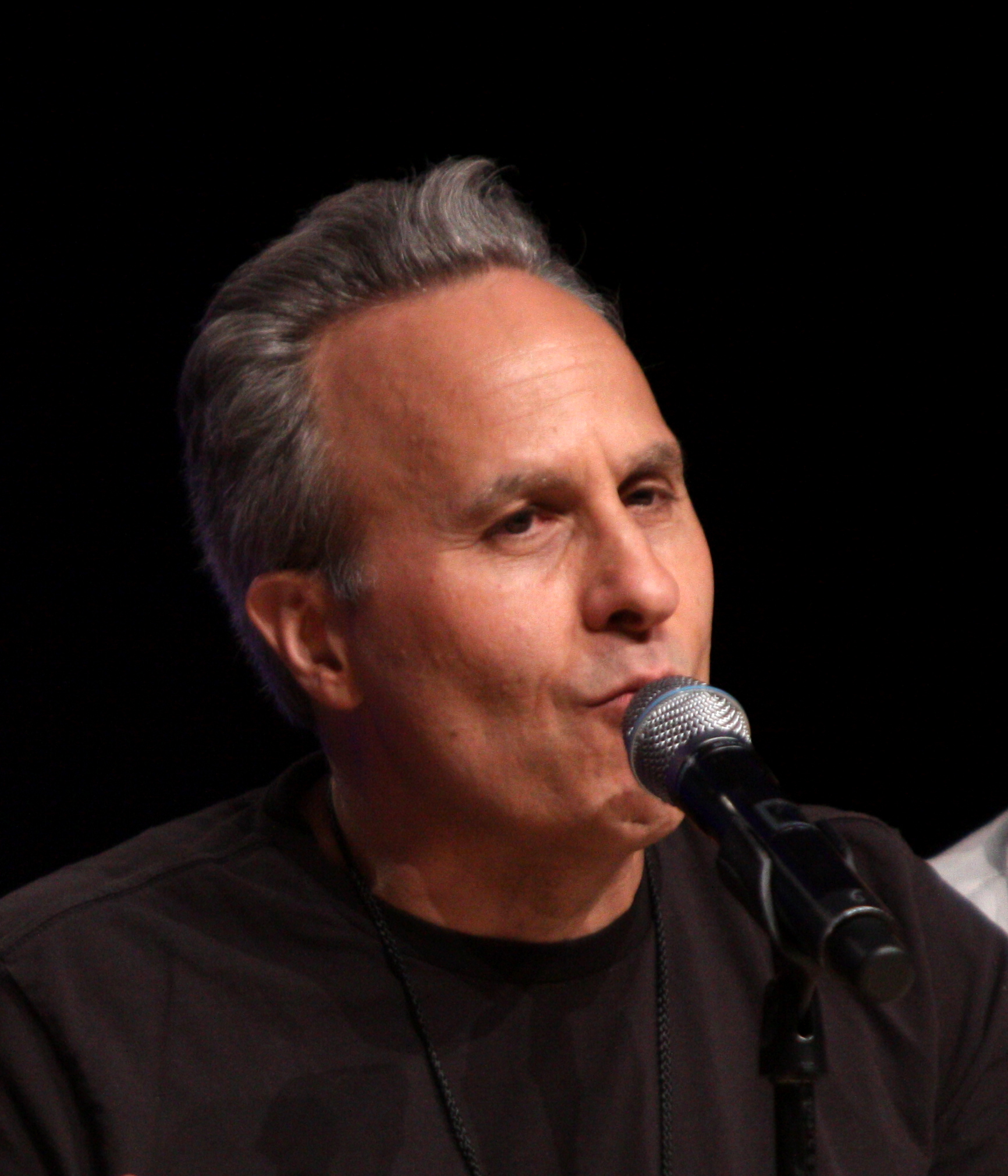
Doug Drexler at the 2013 Phoenix Comicon

Doug Drexler (born in New York City) is an Oscar winning visual effects artist, designer, sculptor, illustrator, and a makeup artist who has collaborated with Al Pacino, Dustin Hoffman, James Caan, Meryl Streep, and Warren Beatty.

== Visual effects career ==
Drexler began his career in the entertainment industry working for makeup artist Dick Smith on such films as The Hunger and Starman. He has also contributed to Three Men and a Little Lady, The Cotton Club, FX, Manhunter and Dick Tracy. Dick Tracy earned Drexler an Oscar, as well as The British Academy Award and the Saturn Award for his special makeup effects on characters such as Big Boy Caprice (played by Pacino) and Mumbles (played by Hoffman). Two Emmy nominations in the same field followed for three years working on Star Trek: The Next Generation, where he performed such tasks as aging Captain Picard for "The Inner Light". His final make-up job for the series was the Mark Twain makeup worn by Jerry Hardin in the two part episode "Times Arrow"

In 1992 Drexler moved to Star Trek: Deep Space Nine as designer, digital artist and effects artist. He continued in that capacity on the subsequent Star Trek films as well as Star Trek: Voyager. In April 2001 Drexler worked as senior Illustrator and CGI designer on the fifth Star Trek series, Enterprise. Following Enterprise, he was hired by Visual Effects Supervisor Gary Hutzel as CG Supervisor on Battlestar Galactica, "Caprica", "Blood and Chrome", and "Defiance". Doug won two Emmy Awards and a Visual Effects Society Award for Galactica.

=== Prosthetic character makeup ===
- 1982 The Hunger
- 1983 The Cotton Club
- 1984 C.H.U.D.
- 1984 Starman
- 1985 Heartburn
- 1985 Manhunter
- 1986 F/X
- 1986 Making Mr. Right
- 1987 Fatal Attraction
- 1988 Liberace
- 1988 Poltergeist III
- 1990 Dick Tracy
- 1990 Three Men and a Little Lady
- 1990 True Identity
- 1991 For the Boys
- 1992 Shining Through
- 1990–1993 Star Trek: The Next Generation

=== Design ===
- 1993–1999 Star Trek: Deep Space Nine
- 1994 Star Trek Generations
- 1996 Star Trek: First Contact
- 1998 Star Trek: Insurrection
- 1998 Buckaroo Banzai: Ancient Secrets and New Mysteries (unproduced TV series)
- 2001–2004 Star Trek: Enterprise
- 2021–2022 The Orville
- 2021–2022 Star Trek: Picard

=== Visual effects ===
- 1999 Starship Troopers
- 1999-00 Star Trek: Voyager
- 2000 Max Steel
- 2000 Star Trek: The Motion Picture -Director's Edition
- 2001 Dan Dare
- 2001–2004 Star Trek: Enterprise
- 2004–2006 Star Trek New Voyages
- 2004–2009 Battlestar Galactica
- 2006 Future by Design
- 2007 Area 57
- 2008 Zeitgeist Addendum
- 2009 Virtuality
- 2009 Caprica
- 2011 Drive Angry
- 2012 Blood and Chrome
- 2013 Defiance
- 2021–2022 The Orville
- 2021–2022 Star Trek: Picard

=== Illustrations ===
- The Star Trek Encyclopedia by Michael and Denise Okuda (ISBN 978-0671869052). Simon & Schuster, publisher.
- Star Fleet Medical Reference Manual by Eileen Palestine and Geoffrey Mandel (ISBN 0-345-27473). Ballantine Books, publisher (Online).
- Star Trek Science Logs by Andre Bormanis (ISBN 978-0671009977). Simon & Schuster, publisher.
- Designing the Future by Jacque Fresco (ISBN 978-2-924024-13-3). The Venus Project, Inc., publisher.

=== Interactive CD-ROMs ===
- Star Trek: Captain's Chair, Simon & Schuster Interactive.
- The Star Trek Interactive Encyclopedia, Simon & Schuster Interactive.

== Published works ==
- Trek Star: The Geek Life of Doug Drexler - How Star Trek's Legendary Designer Made All of His Idiotic Adolescent Dreams Come True by Doug Drexler. Jacobs/Brown Press, publisher. (ISBN Hardcover 979-8998736315, Paperback 979-8998736322, E-Book 979-8998736339)
- Star Trek: Deep Space Nine Technical Manual by Herman Zimmerman, Rick Sternbach, and Doug Drexler. Simon & Schuster, publisher.
- Star Trek Sticker Book by Michael and Denise Okuda, and Doug Drexler. Simon & Schuster, publisher.
- 2001–2011 Star Trek – Ships of the Line Calendar Editor and contributing artist. Simon & Schuster, publisher.

== Cameo appearances ==
Drexler has made a number of uncredited cameos in various projects during his career. Most notably in the film C.H.U.D as a police officer. He has appeared in numerous Star Trek episodes including The Next Generation as well as in the final episode of Enterprise. He also appears in the final episode of Battlestar Galactica. His other on-camera appearances have been in kitschy webseries and in a couple of Star Trek Fan Films. In May 2013 he played a holographic gunslinger in Pilgrim of Eternity, the first episode of the fan produced webseries Star Trek Continues.
