= Star Trek Continues =

Fan-created web series set in Star Trek universe

- Genre: Science fiction; Fantasy
- Based on: Star Trek by Gene Roddenberry
- Developed by: Vic Mignogna
- Directed by: James Kerwin; Vic Mignogna; Julian Higgins; Chris White
- Starring: Vic Mignogna; Todd Haberkorn; Chuck Huber; Chris Doohan; Kim Stinger; Grant Imahara; Wyatt Lenhart; Michele Specht; Steven Dengler; Kipleigh Brown
- Country of origin: United States
- Original language: English
- No. of seasons: 1
- No. of episodes: 11

Production
- Executive producers: Vic Mignogna; Steven Dengler
- Producers: Lisa Hansell; James Kerwin
- Running time: 40–55 minutes
- Production companies: Trek Continues, Inc.; Dracogen

Original release
- Release: May 24, 2013 – November 13, 2017

Star Trek Continues is an American fan-made web series set in the Star Trek universe. Produced by the nonprofit Trek Continues, Inc. and Dracogen, and initially co-produced by Far from Home LLC and Farragut Films (who previously produced a fan-made "Starship Farragut" series), Star Trek Continues consists of eleven episodes released between 2013 and 2017. The series is an unofficial direct continuation of Star Trek: The Original Series, and emulates its visual and storytelling features to achieve the same look and feel. The creators of Star Trek Continues intended to finish the original five-year mission of the show, which they do in the final two episodes.

The series was fan-created and all episodes were released on YouTube. As with all such Star Trek fan productions, use of copyrighted and trademarked properties from the original series was allowed so long as the production was not commercial. A portion of the funds was raised by thousands of backers through successful Kickstarter and Indiegogo campaigns.

Star Trek Continues won a Webby Award for "People's Choice – Long Form Drama" in 2016, a Geekie Award for "Best Web Series" in 2014, and numerous Telly and Accolade awards. The series was very positively received by critics, who praised the quality of the production and stated that the show set a new standard for Star Trek fan films.

== Cast ==
=== Regular cast ===
- Vic Mignogna, as James T. Kirk, the captain and commanding officer of the USS Enterprise. Mignogna is best known for his voice-acting work and is a longtime Star Trek fan.
- Todd Haberkorn, as Spock, a human/Vulcan hybrid, commander, science officer, and first officer, and one of the captain's closest friends. Haberkorn is a voice actor and played Kevin the Teenaxian in Star Trek Beyond.
- Chuck Huber (Larry Nemecek in episodes 1–2) as Leonard H. McCoy, MD, lieutenant commander, and chief medical officer, and also one of the captain's closest friends. Huber is also a voice actor. Nemecek is a well-recognized Trek expert and author of the Star Trek: The Next Generation Companion.
- Chris Doohan as Montgomery Scott, lieutenant commander and chief engineer, usually referred to as Scotty. Doohan is the son of actor James Doohan, who portrayed the character in the original series. Doohan was also an extra in Star Trek: The Motion Picture, and portrayed a transporter chief in the 2009 film Star Trek and its sequel, Star Trek Into Darkness. He reprised his father's role of Scotty in Star Trek Online.

=== Featured cast ===
- Grant Imahara as Hikaru Sulu, lieutenant, helmsman, and third officer. Imahara was best known for his work on Discovery Channel's MythBusters, as well as the creator of robot sidekick "Geoff Peterson" for Late Late Show with Craig Ferguson.
- Kim Stinger as Nyota Uhura, lieutenant and communications officer. Stinger previously played Uhura in several episodes of Star Trek: New Voyages.
- Wyatt Lenhart as Pavel A. Chekov, lieutenant j.g. (formerly ensign) and navigator.
- Michele Specht as Elise McKennah, psychologist, a lieutenant, and Starfleet's first full-time ship's counselor. Specht voiced Specialist Krog (a Na'kuhl agent), Loriss (a Vorta), and Sh'marois (an Andorian Starfleet captain) in Star Trek Online.

=== Trek alumni guest and recurring actors ===
Several past members of the Star Trek cast and crew expressed support for the project and contributed to it, as did several who went on to participate in officially licensed productions later.

- Beau Billingslea as Vice Admiral Stomm (episode 7), an operations-division flag officer from Earth Spacedock. Billingslea played Captain Abbott in Star Trek Into Darkness.
- Kipleigh Brown as Lieutenant j.g. (formerly Yeoman) Barbara Smith (episodes 3–6, 8–11), the Enterprise's relief conn officer. Brown played Jane Taylor in Star Trek: Enterprise and Kuumaarke in Star Trek Online.
- John de Lancie as Galisti (episode 9). De Lancie played Q in Star Trek: The Next Generation, Star Trek: Deep Space Nine, Star Trek: Voyager, Star Trek: Lower Decks, and Star Trek: Picard.
- Michael Dorn as the ISS Enterprise computer voice (episode 3). Dorn played lieutenant, later lieutenant commander Worf in Star Trek: The Next Generation, Star Trek: Deep Space Nine, Star Trek: Picard, Star Trek Online, and the four Star Trek feature films featuring the cast of Star Trek: The Next Generation; he also played Worf's grandfather and namesake Colonel Worf in Star Trek VI: The Undiscovered Country.
- Doug Drexler as Paladin (episode 1). Drexler is probably best known for his work as an award-winning visual-effects artist on Star Trek, as well as Battlestar Galactica and Defiance. He also contributed visual effects for episodes 1–6 of Star Trek Continues.
- Michael Forest as Apollo (episode 1). Forest reprises his role from The Original Series episode "Who Mourns for Adonais?" (which had aired 47 years earlier).
- Jason Isaacs (credited as "Jason Lorca") is an ESPer voice (episode 11). Isaacs played Captain Gabriel Lorca in Star Trek: Discovery and Star Trek Online.
- Mark Rolston as Admiral McGuinness (episode 9), head of Starfleet Medical. Rolston played various roles in Star Trek: The Next Generation and Star Trek: Enterprise.
- Rekha Sharma as Avi Samara (episode 8). Sharma played Commander Ellen Landry in Star Trek: Discovery and Star Trek Online.
- Marina Sirtis as the computer voice in episodes 1, 4, 7, 10, and 11. Sirtis played Counselor Deanna Troi in Star Trek: The Next Generation, Star Trek: Voyager (three episodes), Star Trek: Enterprise (one episode), Star Trek: Picard (seven episodes), Star Trek: Lower Decks (one episode) and four Star Trek feature films.

=== Other recurring actors ===
Additional recurring actors — who were not specifically Trek alumni — included:

- Martin Bradford as Lieutenant Joseph "Jabilo" G. M'Benga, MD (episodes 5, 10), relief medical officer.
- Steven Dengler as Lieutenant William C. Drake, chief of security (episodes 1–10). Dengler is also the founder of Dracogen, one of the producers of the series.
- Erin Gray as Commodore Laura Gray, commanding officer of the Corinth IV starbase (episodes 2, 7).
- Reuben Langdon as Lieutenant Kubaro Dickerson, security guard (episodes 2, 3, 6, 10, and 11).
- Cat Roberts as Lieutenant Elizabeth Palmer, relief communications officer (episodes 3–4, 6–11). Dr. Roberts is a practicing physician.
- Liz Wagner as Ensign Lia Burke, registered nurse (episodes 3–5, 9–11).

=== Other guest actors and support ===
The first episode, "Pilgrim of Eternity", featured Jamie Bamber as well as original-series guest actor Michael Forest reprising his role as Apollo. Marina Sirtis voiced the computer of the USS Enterprise, an homage to her connection to the original actress, Majel Barrett Roddenberry, who portrayed her character's mother, Lwaxana Troi, as well as the voice of the computer in the original Star Trek: The Next Generation and Star Trek, respectively.

For the second episode, "Lolani", Lou Ferrigno appeared as Zaminhon, Daniel Logan appeared as Ensign Tongaroa, Erin Gray appeared as Commodore Gray and Matthew Ewald appeared as Crewman Kenway.

The third episode, "Fairest of Them All", featured guest support from Asia DeMarcos as Marlena Moreau (played in the original series by BarBara Luna), Bobby Clark as Council Leader Tharn, Bobby Quinn Rice as transporter technician, Michael Dorn as the computer of the ISS Enterprise, and the first appearance of Kipleigh Brown as Barbara Smith (played in the original series by Andrea Dromm). Recurring cast member Cat Roberts (Lieutenant Palmer, played in the original series by Elizabeth Rogers), joined the series as of this episode.

The fourth episode, "The White Iris", featured the return of Sirtis as the Enterprise computer, as well as guest stars Colin Baker, Nakia Burrise, Adrienne Wilkinson, Tiffany Brouwer, and Gabriela Fresquez, with cameos by Chris Gore and Robert J. Sawyer.

Episode six, "Come Not Between the Dragons", guest-starred Gigi Edgley. Rod Roddenberry, son of Star Trek creator Gene Roddenberry, had a cameo appearance as a bridge officer in the episode.

Episode seven, "Embracing the Winds", featured Clare Kramer and Beau Billingslea, as well as the return of Erin Gray's flag officer character (Commodore Gray from the second episode) and Marina Sirtis as the computer voice.

Episode eight, "Still Treads the Shadow", featured Rekha Sharma.

Episode nine, "What Ships are For", featured John de Lancie (three Star Trek series) and Anne Lockhart.

Episodes 10 and 11, "To Boldly Go: Part I" and "To Boldly Go: Part II" written by Sawyer, featured Nicola Bryant, Cas Anvar, Amy Rydell (reprising her mother Joanne Linville's role from the original series), and Mark Meer. Part I features April Hebert in the role of Rear Admiral Thesp, who was the longest-tenured cast member of Star Trek: The Experience at the time of its closing. Jason Isaacs (Captain Gabriel Lorca from Star Trek: Discovery) also provides a vocal cameo in Part II, although credited under the pseudonym Jason Lorca.

== Production ==
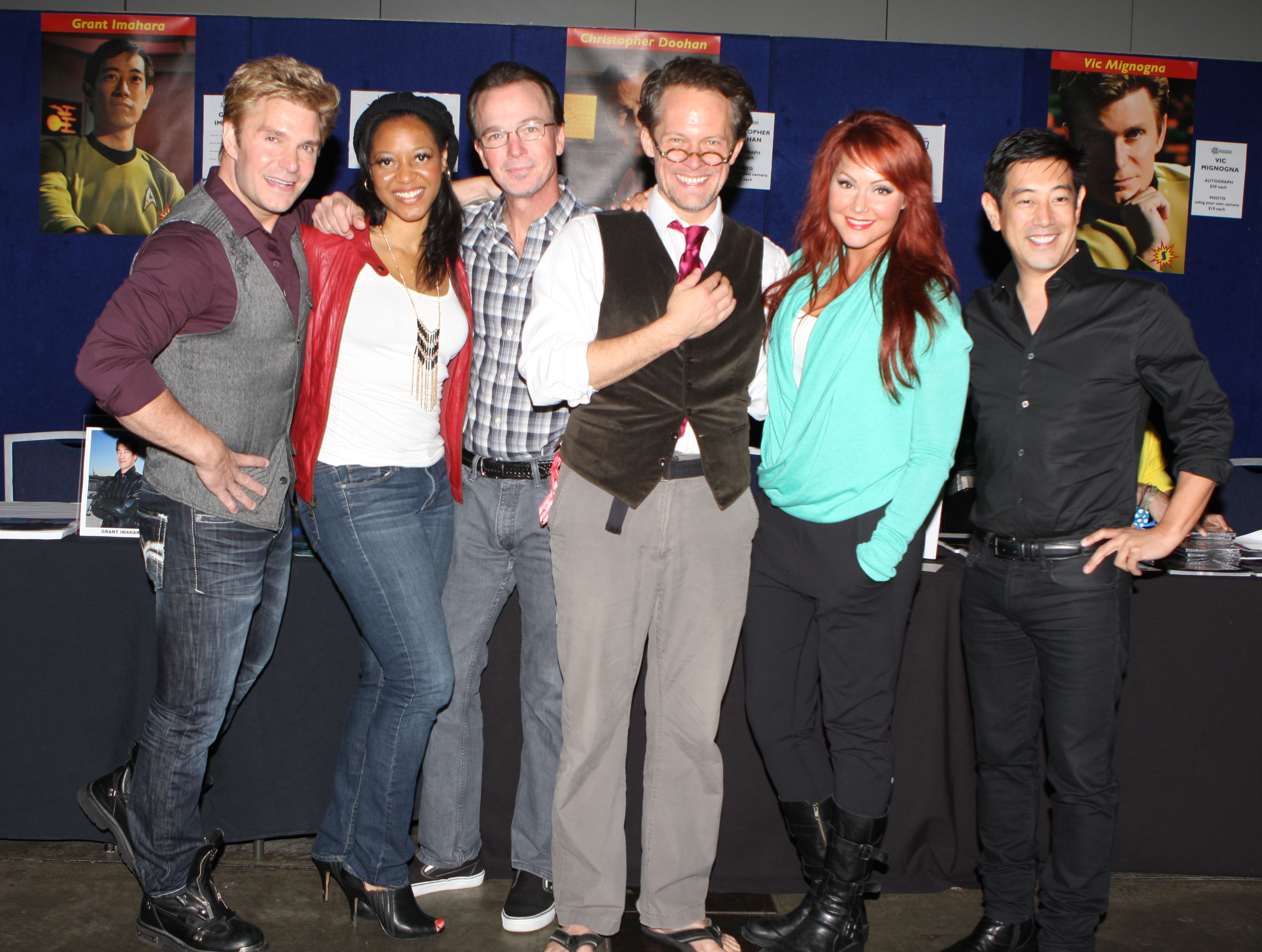
The cast of Star Trek Continues at Supanova 2014: From left to right: Vic Mignogna, Kim Stinger, Christopher Doohan, Chuck Huber, Michele Specht, and Grant Imahara

After directing an episode of Starship Farragut for Farragut Films, Mignogna proposed to the companies involved in its production to form a partnership to support the development of a new web series, aimed at continuing the episodes of TOS.

A facility of 9,600 ft^{2} (891 m^{2}) was acquired in Kingsland, Georgia, to host the sets of the Enterprise, which were built from the original soundstage blueprints.

On March 23, 2012, Farragut Films announced the official cast of the series that, among other professionals, included Chris Doohan (son of James Doohan) and MythBusters' Grant Imahara.

Mignogna and the production team recreated the style of the original series in its sets, cinematography, costumes, acting, and storytelling style. They duplicated the four-act structure used in the original because of the need for commercial breaks. They primarily used the original series' incidental music, as well as the original theme song and credit typography. Starting with the fifth episode, original music by composer Andy Farber was included. They shot the episodes in 4:3 aspect ratio to duplicate the original series' TV format.

The first episode, "Pilgrim of Eternity", premiered at Phoenix Comicon on May 24, 2013, and was released to the public the same day. "Lolani", the second episode, finished shooting in November 2013 with guest stars Lou Ferrigno and Erin Gray. The episode was released online in February 2014 after premiering at Dallas Sci-Fi Expo in Dallas, Texas. Episode three, "Fairest of Them All", began principal photography that month, with a premiere at Supanova 2014 in Sydney, Australia in June 2014. Pre-production on the fourth episode of the series, "The White Iris", began in November 2014, with a release on May 29, 2015, at Phoenix Comicon. The fifth episode premiered on September 25, 2015, at Salt Lake Comic Con followed by a public release on the following day.

According to the ending credits of "Fairest of Them All", a scene of the episode was shot on location at NASA's Space Center Houston, home of the restored life-sized prop of the original Star Trek Galileo shuttlecraft.

In early 2015, Star Trek Continues announced the acquisition of the remainder of the Kingsland facility, totaling 18,500 ft^{2}, under exclusive ownership of Trek Continues Inc. The studio was rebranded as "Stage 9", a homage to the original series' soundstage at Desilu.

=== Kickstarter campaigns ===
After releasing the first episode, funded by Mignogna, new funds for the continuation of the series were raised in part from a successful Kickstarter campaign, humorously dubbed a "Kirkstarter". It was held from October 7 to November 6, 2013, and raised $126,028 from 2,981 backers, surpassing the set goal of $100,000, to cover funding for episodes 2, 3, and 4.

A second Kickstarter campaign ran from January 17 to February 16, 2015. It successfully raised $214,584, exceeding its goal of $100,000. The sum covered the production costs of episodes 5, 6, and 7, and facilitated the construction of an engineering room and planet set.

A third and final crowdfunding campaign—this time organized via Indiegogo—was held in early 2016, raising $199,049. Shortly thereafter, the producers announced that additional private donations to the Trek Continues Inc. charity allowed the company to exceed its fundraising goal of $350,000, thus enabling the production of four additional episodes.

== Episodes ==
=== Full episodes ===
No.	Title	Stardate	Directed by	Written by	Original release date
1	"Pilgrim of Eternity"	6147.3	Vic Mignogna	Steve Frattarola & Jack Treviño (teleplay); Vic Mignogna & Jack Marshall (story)	May 24, 2013
An ill and much older Apollo appears on the Enterprise, creating havoc and leaving Captain Kirk with the problem of deciding his fate.
2	"Lolani"	6154.1	Chris White	Huston Huddleston and Paul Bianchi (teleplay); Vic Mignogna & Huston Huddleston (story)	February 8, 2014
Captain Kirk and his crew are torn by the moral dilemmas that arise when they rescue an Orion slave from a distressed Tellarite ship, and receive an order to return her to an abusive Orion master to avert a war.
3	"Fairest of Them All"	Unknown	James Kerwin	James Kerwin & Vic Mignogna (teleplay); Vic Mignogna (story)	June 15, 2014
In this continuation of the TOS episode "Mirror, Mirror", Spock confronts Kirk in order to set a more peaceful course for the troubled Terran Empire.
4	"The White Iris"	6182.3	James Kerwin	James Kerwin & Chris White & Vic Mignogna (teleplay); Vic Mignogna & Chris White (story)	May 29, 2015
Kirk deals with guilt from his past while Chalcis, a world that wants to join the Federation, finds itself in danger from a missile attack by its twin planet Eretria, and Kirk's infection renders him unable to recall the password he set on the missile defense system.
5	"Divided We Stand"	6202.1	Vic Mignogna	Marc Cushman & Susan Osborn (teleplay); Vic Mignogna (story)	September 26, 2015
Kirk and McCoy are trapped in US Civil War history while the Enterprise fights off mysterious nanite intruders that have invaded their brains to run this simulation.
6	"Come Not Between the Dragons"	6257.4	Julian Higgins	Greg Dykstra and James Kerwin & Vic Mignogna (teleplay); Greg Dykstra (story)	May 28, 2016
A troubled rock creature pierces the Enterprise hull, pitting the crew against a pursuer that fires anger-causing waves at the Enterprise.
7	"Embracing the Winds"	6295.3	James Kerwin	James Kerwin & Vic Mignogna (teleplay); James Kerwin (story)	September 3, 2016
The Enterprise is assigned to salvage a starship that lost its crew under mysterious circumstances, while Kirk and Spock are summoned to a starbase for a classified briefing and get involved in a debate about the employment of female captains on Constitution-class starships.
8	"Still Treads the Shadow"	6563.4	Julian Higgins	Judy Burns	April 2, 2017
The Enterprise discovers a lost starship on the edge of an interphasic portal. It carries an elderly duplicate Kirk from a subspace divergence field, who reprogrammed its computer into an AI that nearly destroys the entire sector with a dark-matter experiment to reach its goal of getting Kirk home. After the Enterprise provides a Trojan-horse program to disable the AI, elderly Kirk must fly back into the rift to avert the destruction.
9	"What Ships Are For"	6892.3	Vic Mignogna	Kipleigh Brown (teleplay); Vic Mignogna & James Kerwin & Kipleigh Brown (story)	July 30, 2017
Kirk must convince an unenlightened alien species to embrace their most hated adversaries, on a world that is entirely devoid of color because its radiation impairs the functioning of cone cells but that is about to be shut off.
10	"To Boldly Go: Part I"	6988.4	James Kerwin	Robert J. Sawyer (teleplay); Vic Mignogna & James Kerwin and Robert J. Sawyer (story)	October 18, 2017
To solve the ultimate mystery, the Enterprise must return to where Kirk's five-year mission began and face Federation rebels who have strong psionic ability.
11	"To Boldly Go: Part II"	6995.1	James Kerwin	Robert J. Sawyer and James Kerwin (teleplay); Vic Mignogna & James Kerwin and Robert J. Sawyer (story)	November 13, 2017
The iconic mission of the U.S.S. Enterprise comes to an end, as Kirk and his crew battle the ultimate adversary.

=== Vignettes ===
Before screening the first episode, a series of three short videos, called vignettes, was released from July 31 to November 30, 2012. The first vignette is an extended ending of the last episode of the original series, "Turnabout Intruder", created to present the fan production as a direct continuation of it.

No.	Title	Stardate	Directed by	Written by	Original release date
V1	"Turnabout Intruder"	5928.5	Jack Marshall	Arthur H. Singer (original 1969 teleplay), Vic Mignogna (new material)	July 31, 2012
After a temporary swap of bodies occurred between Kirk and Dr. Janice Lester, the captain and the crew resume their duties. This sequence was filmed shot for shot from the original series.
V2	"You've Got the Conn"	Unknown	Vic Mignogna	Vic Mignogna & Jack Marshall	September 30, 2012
Uhura, Chekov and Sulu have a bit of fun with the captain's chair during a night shift but are caught in the act by an unexpected Captain Kirk.
V3	"Happy Birthday, Scotty"	Unknown	Vic Mignogna	Vic Mignogna	November 30, 2012
Though Scotty welcomes the arrival of an improved hand phaser, McCoy is not particularly happy about being told to practise with it.

== Reaction ==
=== Reception ===
The reception of Star Trek Continues has been very positive, with critics and reviewers highlighting the quality of the production and the resemblance of the episodes with those of the original series. On July 12, 2013, Dan Roth of SyFy's Blastr wrote: "Lots of people try to make fan versions of Trek. None of them look like this." Slice of SciFi's Sam Sloan wrote: "They have certainly raised the bar for independent Star Trek episodic film making", an opinion shared by other reviewers as well. On June 18, 2014, Bill Watters of TrekMovie.com wrote: "Star Trek Continues does deserve the 'Continues' in its title as they do a really strong job at capturing (and yes, 'continuing') the atmosphere of TOS."

On December 16, 2013, about a month after the ending of the Kickstarter campaign, Kevin Pollak's Chat Show published a video interview with Tom Hanks in which the actor highly praises a Star Trek fan production and its "people that recreate with incredibly, startlingly great production values unseen Star Trek episodes", adding that "it looks exactly like the starship Enterprise". Although he could not put a name to the series, he described it citing information compatible with the identity of Star Trek Continues, which motivated the producers and a few sources to assume and claim that the actor was referring to them.

On July 31, 2014, Rod Roddenberry attended an official screening of "Fairest of Them All" in Las Vegas and endorsed the project, stating: "I do have to say, and I said this after 'Lolani', I'm pretty damn sure my dad would consider this canon. The fact that you do stories that mean something, that have depth, that make us all think a little bit, I really think he would applaud you guys, and I applaud you guys, and as far as I am concerned, it is canon. So thank you."

The publication Wired has dedicated to Star Trek Continues five videos of its video series Obsessed, that aims to highlight "what happens when people live out their obsessions to the fullest." Obsessed shows Mignogna and other people of the staff explaining to what extent they have paid attention to detail to recreate the Enterprise set and the visual style of the original series. The videos have been published from June 13 to July 1, 2014, on the Obsessed website.

=== Awards and nominations ===
Year	Award	Category	Result
2013	Lost Episode Festival Toronto	Best Feature	Won
2013	71st World Science Fiction Convention	Best Fan Film ("Pilgrim of Eternity")	Won
2014	The Geekie Awards	Best Web Series	Won
2014	Burbank International Film Festival	Best New Media – Drama ("Fairest of Them All")	Won
2015	Telly Awards	People's Telly ("Fairest of Them All")	Won
2015	Telly Awards	Online Drama ("Fairest of Them All")	Bronze (2nd)
2015	Telly Awards	Film/Video Production ("Fairest of Them All")	Bronze (2nd)
2015	Accolade Competition	Webisode ("Lolani")	Award of Merit
2015	Accolade Competition	Makeup ("Lolani")	Award of Merit
2015	Accolade Competition	Webisode ("Fairest of Them All")	Award of Excellence
2015	Accolade Competition	Cinematography ("Fairest of Them All")	Award of Excellence
2015	Accolade Competition	Directing ("Fairest of Them All")	Award of Excellence
2015	Accolade Competition	Webisode ("The White Iris")	Award of Excellence
2015	Accolade Competition	Webisode ("Divided We Stand")	Award of Excellence
2015	Accolade Competition	Directing ("Divided We Stand")	Award of Excellence
2015	Accolade Competition	Actor (Vic Mignogna) ("Divided We Stand")	Award of Merit
2015	Independent Star Trek Fan Film Awards	Best Production Design ("Lolani," "Fairest of Them All")	Finalist
2015	Independent Star Trek Fan Film Awards	Best Visual Effects ("Lolani," "Fairest of Them All")	Finalist
2015	Independent Star Trek Fan Film Awards	Best Soundtrack ("Lolani," "Fairest of Them All")	Finalist
2015	Independent Star Trek Fan Film Awards	Best Original Story or Screenplay ("Lolani")	Finalist
2015	Independent Star Trek Fan Film Awards	Best Original Story or Screenplay ("Fairest of Them All")	Finalist
2015	Independent Star Trek Fan Film Awards	Best Actor or Actress (Vic Mignogna, "Lolani," "Fairest of Them All")	Won
2015	Independent Star Trek Fan Film Awards	Best Director (James Kerwin, "Fairest of Them All")	Finalist
2015	Independent Star Trek Fan Film Awards	Best Director (Chris White, "Lolani")	Finalist
2015	Independent Star Trek Fan Film Awards	Best Dramatic Presentation, Long Form ("Fairest of Them All")	Won
2015	Independent Star Trek Fan Film Awards	Best Dramatic Presentation, Long Form ("Lolani")	Finalist
2016	20th Annual Webby Awards	Drama: Long Form or Series	Nominated
2016	20th Annual Webby Awards	People's Voice Drama: Long Form or Series	Won
2016	Telly Awards	Film/Video Directing ("The White Iris")	Bronze (2nd)
2016	Independent Star Trek Fan Film Awards	Best Production Design ("Divided We Stand," "The White Iris")	Finalist
2016	Independent Star Trek Fan Film Awards	Best Special & Visual Effects ("Divided We Stand")	Finalist
2016	Independent Star Trek Fan Film Awards	Best Special & Visual Effects ("The White Iris")	Finalist
2016	Independent Star Trek Fan Film Awards	Best Sound Design, Editing & Mixing ("Divided We Stand")	Finalist
2016	Independent Star Trek Fan Film Awards	Best Sound Design, Editing & Mixing ("The White Iris")	Finalist
2016	Independent Star Trek Fan Film Awards	Best Original Music ("The White Iris")	Won
2016	Independent Star Trek Fan Film Awards	Best Makeup & Hairstyling ("Divided We Stand")	Finalist
2016	Independent Star Trek Fan Film Awards	Best Makeup & Hairstyling ("The White Iris")	Finalist
2016	Independent Star Trek Fan Film Awards	Best Costuming ("The White Iris")	Finalist
2016	Independent Star Trek Fan Film Awards	Best Guest Actor or Actress (Colin Baker, "The White Iris")	Won
2016	Independent Star Trek Fan Film Awards	Best Guest Actor or Actress (Martin Bradford, "Divided We Stand")	Finalist
2016	Independent Star Trek Fan Film Awards	Best Guest Actor or Actress (Tiffany Brouwer, "The White Iris")	Finalist
2016	Independent Star Trek Fan Film Awards	Best Supporting Actor or Actress (Michele Specht, "Divided We Stand," "The White Iris")	Won
2016	Independent Star Trek Fan Film Awards	Best Supporting Actor or Actress (Grant Imahara, "Divided We Stand," "The White Iris")	Finalist
2016	Independent Star Trek Fan Film Awards	Best Supporting Actor or Actress (Wyatt Lenhart, "Divided We Stand," "The White Iris")	Finalist
2016	Independent Star Trek Fan Film Awards	Best Lead Actor or Actress (Todd Haberkorn, "Divided We Stand," "The White Iris")	Won
2016	Independent Star Trek Fan Film Awards	Best Lead Actor or Actress (Vic Mignogna, "Divided We Stand," "The White Iris")	Finalist
2016	Independent Star Trek Fan Film Awards	Best Director (James Kerwin, "The White Iris")	Finalist
2016	Independent Star Trek Fan Film Awards	Best Director (Vic Mignogna, "Divided We Stand")	Finalist
2016	Independent Star Trek Fan Film Awards	Best Original Story or Screenplay ("Divided We Stand")	Finalist
2016	Independent Star Trek Fan Film Awards	Best Original Story or Screenplay ("The White Iris")	Finalist
2016	Independent Star Trek Fan Film Awards	Best Dramatic Presentation, Long Form ("The White Iris")	Won
2016	Independent Star Trek Fan Film Awards	Best Dramatic Presentation, Long Form ("Divided We Stand")	Finalist
2017	Burbank International Film Festival	Best New Media – Drama ("What Ships Are For")	Won
2017	International Independent Film Awards	Actor In a Leading Role – Vic Mignogna ("Still Treads the Shadow")	Platinum Award
2017	International Independent Film Awards	Sound Editing/Design ("Still Treads the Shadow")	Platinum Award
2017	International Independent Film Awards	Special Effects Make-up ("Still Treads the Shadow")	Platinum Award
2017	International Independent Film Awards	Webisode ("Still Treads the Shadow")	Platinum Award
2017	International Independent Film Awards	Production Design ("Still Treads the Shadow")	Platinum Award
2017	Independent Star Trek Fan Film Awards	Best Special & Visual Effects ("Come Not Between the Dragons")	Finalist
2017	Independent Star Trek Fan Film Awards	Best Sound Design, Editing & Mixing ("Come Not Between the Dragons")	Won
2017	Independent Star Trek Fan Film Awards	Best Sound Design, Editing & Mixing ("Embracing the Winds")	Finalist
2017	Independent Star Trek Fan Film Awards	Best Original Music ("Come Not Between the Dragons")	Finalist
2017	Independent Star Trek Fan Film Awards	Best Makeup & Hairstyling ("Come Not Between the Dragons")	Won
2017	Independent Star Trek Fan Film Awards	Best Makeup & Hairstyling ("Embracing the Winds")	Finalist
2017	Independent Star Trek Fan Film Awards	Best Costuming ("Come Not Between the Dragons")	Won
2017	Independent Star Trek Fan Film Awards	Best Costuming ("Embracing the Winds")	Finalist
2017	Independent Star Trek Fan Film Awards	Best Guest Actor or Actress (Gigi Edgley, "Come Not Between the Dragons")	Won
2017	Independent Star Trek Fan Film Awards	Best Guest Actor or Actress (Erin Gray, "Embracing the Winds")	Finalist
2017	Independent Star Trek Fan Film Awards	Best Guest Actor or Actress (Clare Kramer, "Embracing the Winds")	Finalist
2017	Independent Star Trek Fan Film Awards	Best Supporting Actor or Actress (Michele Specht, "Come Not Between the Dragons," "Embracing the Winds")	Won
2017	Independent Star Trek Fan Film Awards	Best Supporting Actor or Actress (Grant Imahara, "Come Not Between the Dragons," "Embracing the Winds")	Finalist
2017	Independent Star Trek Fan Film Awards	Best Supporting Actor or Actress (Cat Roberts, "Come Not Between the Dragons," "Embracing the Winds")	Finalist
2017	Independent Star Trek Fan Film Awards	Best Supporting Actor or Actress (Kim Stinger, "Come Not Between the Dragons," "Embracing the Winds")	Finalist
2017	Independent Star Trek Fan Film Awards	Best Lead Actor or Actress (Chris Doohan, "Come Not Between the Dragons," "Embracing the Winds")	Finalist
2017	Independent Star Trek Fan Film Awards	Best Lead Actor or Actress (Vic Mignogna, "Come Not Between the Dragons," "Embracing the Winds")	Finalist
2017	Independent Star Trek Fan Film Awards	Best Director (James Kerwin, "Embracing the Winds")	Won
2017	Independent Star Trek Fan Film Awards	Best Director (Julian Higgins, "Come Not Between the Dragons")	Finalist
2017	Independent Star Trek Fan Film Awards	Best Original Story or Screenplay ("Embracing the Winds")	Finalist
2017	Independent Star Trek Fan Film Awards	Best Original Story or Screenplay ("Come Not Between the Dragons")	Finalist
2017	Independent Star Trek Fan Film Awards	Best Dramatic Presentation, Long Form ("Come Not Between the Dragons")	Finalist
2017	Independent Star Trek Fan Film Awards	Best Dramatic Presentation, Long Form ("Embracing the Winds")	Finalist
2018	Telly Awards	People's Telly ("To Boldly Go: Part II")	Won
2018	Telly Awards	Scripted Webseries	Won
2018	Bjo Awards	Best Special & Visual Effects ("To Boldly Go, Part II")	Won
2018	Bjo Awards	Best Special & Visual Effects ("Still Treads the Shadow")	Finalist
2018	Bjo Awards	Best Special & Visual Effects ("To Boldly Go, Part I")	Finalist
2018	Bjo Awards	Best Special & Visual Effects ("What Ships Are For")	Finalist
2018	Bjo Awards	Best Sound Design, Editing & Mixing ("To Boldly Go, Part II")	Won
2018	Bjo Awards	Best Sound Design, Editing & Mixing ("Still Treads the Shadow")	Finalist
2018	Bjo Awards	Best Sound Design, Editing & Mixing ("To Boldly Go, Part I")	Finalist
2018	Bjo Awards	Best Sound Design, Editing & Mixing ("What Ships Are For")	Finalist
2018	Bjo Awards	Best Original Music ("To Boldly Go, Part I")	Finalist
2018	Bjo Awards	Best Original Music ("What Ships Are For")	Finalist
2018	Bjo Awards	Best Makeup & Hairstyling ("To Boldly Go, Part II")	Won
2018	Bjo Awards	Best Makeup & Hairstyling ("To Boldly Go, Part I")	Finalist
2018	Bjo Awards	Best Makeup & Hairstyling ("What Ships Are For")	Finalist
2018	Bjo Awards	Best Costuming ("To Boldly Go, Part II")	Won
2018	Bjo Awards	Best Costuming ("Still Treads the Shadow")	Finalist
2018	Bjo Awards	Best Costuming ("What Ships Are For")	Finalist
2018	Bjo Awards	Best Guest Actor or Actress (Amy Rydell, "To Boldly Go, Part I," "To Boldly Go, Part II")	Won
2018	Bjo Awards	Best Guest Actor or Actress (Nicola Bryant, "To Boldly Go, Part II")	Finalist
2018	Bjo Awards	Best Guest Actor or Actress (John de Lancie, "What Ships Are For")	Finalist
2018	Bjo Awards	Best Guest Actor or Actress (Anne Lockhart, "What Ships Are For")	Finalist
2018	Bjo Awards	Best Guest Actor or Actress (Elizabeth Maxwell, "What Ships Are For")	Finalist
2018	Bjo Awards	Best Supporting Actor or Actress (Michele Specht, "What Ships Are For," "To Boldly Go, Part I")	Won
2018	Bjo Awards	Best Supporting Actor or Actress (Kipleigh Brown, "To Boldly Go, Part II")	Finalist
2018	Bjo Awards	Best Supporting Actor or Actress (Grant Imahara, "To Boldly Go, Part II")	Finalist
2018	Bjo Awards	Best Lead Actor or Actress (Vic Mignogna, "What Ships Are For," "To Boldly Go, Part I," "To Boldly Go, Part II")	Won
2018	Bjo Awards	Best Lead Actor or Actress (Chris Doohan, "To Boldly Go, Part I")	Finalist
2018	Bjo Awards	Best Lead Actor or Actress (Todd Haberkorn, "Still Treads the Shadow," "To Boldly Go, Part II")	Finalist
2018	Bjo Awards	Best Director (Vic Mignogna, "What Ships Are For")	Won
2018	Bjo Awards	Best Director (Julian Higgins, "Still Treads the Shadow")	Finalist
2018	Bjo Awards	Best Director (James Kerwin, "To Boldly Go, Part II")	Finalist
2018	Bjo Awards	Best Original Story or Screenplay ("What Ships Are For")	Won
2018	Bjo Awards	Best Original Story or Screenplay ("To Boldly Go, Part I")	Finalist
2018	Bjo Awards	Best Original Story or Screenplay ("To Boldly Go, Part II")	Finalist
2018	Bjo Awards	Best Dramatic Presentation, Long Form ("To Boldly Go, Part II")	Won
2018	Bjo Awards	Best Dramatic Presentation, Long Form ("To Boldly Go, Part I")	Finalist
2018	Bjo Awards	Best Dramatic Presentation, Long Form ("What Ships Are For")	Finalist

== See also ==
- Star Trek: New Voyages: another fan made series modeled on the original Star Trek series
