= Michele Specht =

American actress

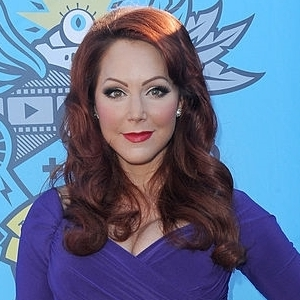
- Specht at the 2014 Geekie Awards
- Born: Lincoln, Nebraska
- Occupations: Actress; comedian
- Years active: 2001–present
- Partner: Vic Mignogna (2006–2018)

Michele Specht (/ˈspɛkt/) is an American actress and comedian, known for playing Katie in the VH1 series I Hate My 30's and Doctor McKennah in the web series Star Trek Continues.

== Biography ==
The middle of three daughters, Specht was born in Lincoln, Nebraska and raised in Colorado. She attended Air Academy High School and later earned degrees in Classical Vocal Music Performance and Theatre at College of Saint Benedict and Saint John's University.

== Personal life ==
Specht was in a relationship with actor Vic Mignogna from 2006 to May 2018.

== Filmography ==
=== Live action ===
Year	Series	Role	Notes
2003	The Movie Hero	Secretary	
2004	Deliverance: The Musical		
2005	CSI:NY	Assistant Medical Examiner	
2007	I Hate My 30's	Katie (9 episodes)	Specht's first major role
2008	Carpoolers	Suzy	
2010	Politics of Love	Liz Moore	
2010	Backyard Wedding	Dori	
2010	The Last Godfather	Lily, the Burlesque Club owner	
2011	Through the Eye	Annie	
2012	Kickin' It	Carlotta	Episode The Dream Chasers
2013	Aperture R&D	Betty	
2013	Fallout: Nuka Break	Red	
2013	Star Trek: New Voyages	Kali	Episode 8: Kitumba
2013-2017	Star Trek Continues	Doctor Elise McKennah	

=== Web originals and short films ===
Year	Series	Role	Notes
2001	Silent Story		
2007	Love Conquers Al	Bridgette	
2009	Addicted to Facebook	Roxy	
2009	ShopNation	Rita	
2011	Nuka Break	Red	
2012	Todd of the Rings	Gimli	Part of a series called The Tribute Wars

=== Animated roles ===
Year	Series	Role	Notes
2006	Ouran High School Host Club	Maid to the Hitatchin twins	
2006-2007	MÄR: Märchen Awakens Romance	Pano	
2007	Darker than Black: Kuro no Keiyakusha	Anni	
2007	Claymore (anime)	Veronica	
2007	Strain: Strategic Armored Infantry	Mary	
2007, 2009	Tsubasa Chronicle	Mikado Amaterasu	
2008	Madagascar: Escape 2 Africa	Nurse Sandy	Feature Film Role
2009	Linebarrels of Iron	Yurianne	

=== Video game roles ===
Year	Series	Role	Notes
2007	Clive Barker's Jericho	Corporal Simone Cole	grouped under Cast
2008	Emergency Mayhem	Dispatcher	
2008	Race Driver: Grid	Manageress	
2011	Dynasty Warriors 7: Xtreme Legends	Wang Yi	Uncredited
2013	Dynasty Warriors 8	Wang Yi	Uncredited
2014	Smite	Nox	
2014	Lightning Returns: Final Fantasy XIII	Additional Voices	
2016, 2018	Star Trek Online	Krog, Loriss	
