= Fallout: Nuka Break =

American fan-made TV series

- Season 1 promotional poster
- Genre: Action; Adventure; Post-apocalyptic
- Created by: Zack Finfrock
- Written by: Brian Clevinger
- Directed by: Vincent Talenti
- Starring: Zack Finfrock; Aaron Giles; Tybee Diskin
- Narrated by: Vic Mignogna
- Composer: Dan Martinez
- Country of origin: United States
- Original language: English
- No. of seasons: 3
- No. of episodes: 15 + 1 pilot + 1 special

Production
- Executive producers: Zack Finfrock; Melaine Wagor
- Producers: Zack Finfrock; Melaine Wagor
- Production location: Nevada, United States
- Cinematography: Aaron Scott Moorhead Matt Ryan
- Production company: Wayside Creations

Original release
- Network: YouTube

Fallout: Nuka Break is a live-action fan-made web series made by Wayside Creations and set in the Fallout video game universe. Its direct setting is derived from both Fallout 3 and Fallout: New Vegas. Nuka Break features three main characters, a "Vault dweller, his ghoul companion, and a slave they freed from New Vegas". Along with the sets, puppets are used for some of the scenes, while CGI is used for the gun battles and other scenes. The series features actor Doug Jones as a guest star, playing Mayor Conners, and voice actor Vic Mignogna as the merchant/narrator.

== Development ==
The series was originally conceived as a film titled Fallout: Nuka Break – The Movie, which was released in early 2011 on YouTube. The film was so popular that Wayside Creations, a non-profit made up of "a team of Fallout fans", decided to turn it into a full miniseries, with the first episode being released in September 2011. A second season, funded via Kickstarter, was released on October 28, 2013. Wayside also made a second film called Red Star, which is set between the original fan film and the first season. Another project, a three-part miniseries called Tales from the Wasteland, was successfully funded via Kickstarter.

Members of the original cast and writing team resigned from their affiliation with Wayside Creations and weren't involved with Tales from the Wasteland or future Wayside projects. Wayside released a prequel series Fallout: The Wanderer focusing on the Ranger character in three episodes by early 2018. In 2024, in the lead up to the Fallout TV show, Zach announced a Kickstarter for a new short film sequel to the series titled Fallout: Breaking.

== Reception ==
Gizmodo France wrote of the environment depicted in the series, "the desert landscapes are very beautiful and focus on the highlights (with an image that is a bit reminiscent of films by Jean-Pierre Jeunet)." According to GameFront, the original film "actually captures the feel of Fallout pretty well. The ghoul looks really cool, VATS is in there, and the whole point is to find some Nuka-Cola. It's totally worth your time to watch it." The Portland Mercury commented that, while Bethesda may eventually shut down the series with a cease and desist order, until then "we can all enjoy the sweet metafiction that Bethesda has so long denied us."

Contrary to these concerns, Bethesda's official blog has linked to the series and called it a "great work" and Obsidian Entertainment (the developer of Fallout: New Vegas under license from Bethesda) developer and project direct of Fallout: New Vegas Joshua Sawyer has confirmed that the Nuka Breaker DLC item is a reference to the series.
