= Adonais =

1821 poem written by Percy Bysshe Shelley

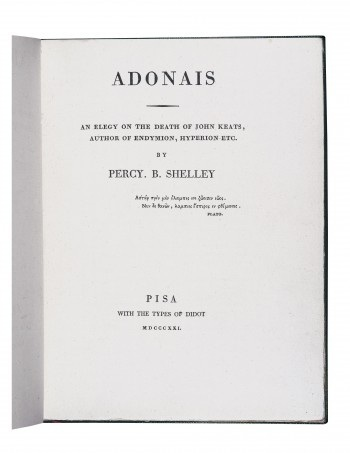
1821 title page, Pisa, Italy: Ollier.

Adonais: An Elegy on the Death of John Keats, Author of Endymion, Hyperion, etc. (/ˌædoʊˈneɪ.ɪs/) is a pastoral elegy written by Percy Bysshe Shelley for John Keats in 1821, and widely regarded as one of Shelley's best and best-known works. The poem, which is in 495 lines in 55 Spenserian stanzas, was composed in the spring of 1821 immediately after 11 April, when Shelley heard of Keats's death (seven weeks earlier). It is a pastoral elegy, in the English tradition of John Milton's Lycidas. Shelley had studied and translated classical elegies. The title of the poem is modelled on ancient works, such as Achilleis (a poem about Achilles), an epic poem by the 1st-century AD Roman poet Statius, and refers to the untimely death of the Greek Adonis, a god of fertility. Some critics suggest that Shelley used Virgil's tenth Eclogue, in praise of Cornelius Gallus, as a model.

It was published by Charles Ollier in July 1821 (see 1821 in poetry) with a preface in which Shelley made the mistaken assertion that Keats had died from a rupture of the lung induced by rage at the unfairly harsh reviews of his verse in the Quarterly Review and other journals. He also thanked Joseph Severn for caring for Keats in Rome. This praise increased literary interest in Severn's works.

== Background ==
Shelley was introduced to Keats in Hampstead towards the end of 1816 by their mutual friend, Leigh Hunt, who was to transfer his enthusiasm from Keats to Shelley. Shelley's initial admiration of Keats was ambiguous: his reception to Keats' Endymion was largely unfavourable, while he found his later work, Hyperion, to be the highest example of contemporary poetry. Keats found some of Shelley's advice patronising (the suggestion, for example, that Keats should not publish his early work). It is also possible that Keats resented Hunt's transferred allegiance. Despite this, the two poets exchanged letters after Shelley and his wife moved to Italy. When Keats fell ill, the Shelleys invited him to stay with them in Pisa, but Keats only made it as far as Rome, accompanied by the painter Severn. Shelley's concern for Keats's health remained undimmed, until he learned months after the fact that Keats had died in Rome, prompting the composition of Adonais. Shelley said of Keats, after inviting him to stay with him in Pisa after the latter fell ill: "I am aware indeed that I am nourishing a rival who will far surpass me and this is an additional motive & will be an added pleasure."

Shelley regarded Adonais as the "least imperfect" of his works. In a 5 June 1821 letter to John and Maria Gisborne, Shelley wrote about the work: "It is a highly wrought piece of art, perhaps better in point of composition than anything I have written."

== Summary ==
The poet weeps for John Keats, who is dead and who will be long mourned. He calls on Urania to mourn for Keats who died in Rome (sts. I–VII). The poet summons the subject matter of Keats's poetry to weep for him. It comes and mourns at his bidding (sts. VIII–XV). Nature, celebrated by Keats in his poetry, mourns him. Spring, which brings nature to new life, cannot restore him (sts. XVI–XXI). Urania rises, goes to Keats's death chamber and laments that she cannot join him in death (sts. XXII–XXIX). Fellow poets mourn the death of Keats: Byron, Thomas Moore, Shelley, and Leigh Hunt (sts. XXX–XXXV). The anonymous Quarterly Review critic is blamed for Keats's death and chastised (sts. XXXVI–XXXVII).

The poet urges the mourners not to weep any longer. Keats has become a portion of the eternal and is free from the attacks of reviewers. He is not dead; it is the living who are dead. He has gone where "envy and calumny and hate and pain" cannot reach him. He is "made one with Nature." His being has been withdrawn into the one Spirit which is responsible for all beauty. In eternity, other poets, among them Thomas Chatterton, Sir Philip Sidney, and the Roman poet Lucan, come to greet him (sts. XXXVIII–XLVI). Let anyone who still mourns Keats send his "spirit's light" beyond space and be filled with hope, or let him go to Rome where Keats is buried. Let him "Seek shelter in the shadow of the tomb. / What Adonais is, why fear we to become?" He is with the unchanging Spirit, Intellectual Beauty, or Love in heaven. By comparison with the clear light of eternity, life is a stain (sts. XLVII–LII).

The poet tells himself he should now depart from life, which has nothing left to offer. The One, which is Light, Beauty, Benediction, and Love, now shines on him. He feels carried "darkly, fearfully, afar" to where the soul of Keats glows like a star, in the dwelling where those who will live forever are (sts. LIII–LV).

== Synopsis ==
=== Stanzas 1–35 ===
Adonais begins with the announcement of his death and the mourning that followed: "I weep for Adonais—he is dead!" In Stanzas 2 through 35 a series of mourners lament the death of Adonais. The mother of Adonais, Urania, is invoked to arise to conduct the ceremony at his bier. The allusion is to Urania, the goddess of astronomy, and to the goddess Venus, who is also known as Venus Urania.

The over-riding theme is one of despair. Mourners are implored to "weep for Adonais—he is dead!" In Stanza 9 the "flocks" of the deceased appear, representing his dreams and inspirations. In Stanza 13, the personifications of the thoughts, emotions, attitudes, and skills of the deceased appear. In Stanza 22, Urania is awakened by the grief of Misery and the poet. The lament is invoked: "He will awake no more, oh, never more!" Urania pleads in vain for Adonais to awake and to arise.

In Stanzas 30 through 34, a series of human mourners appears. The "Pilgrim of Eternity" is Lord Byron, George Gordon, who had met and was a friend of Shelley's but who had never met Keats. The Irish poet Thomas Moore then appears who laments the sadness and loss that time causes. Shelley himself and Leigh Hunt are also part of the "procession of mourners". In Stanzas 31 through 34 the mourner is described as "one frail Form" who has "fled astray", "his branded and ensanguined brow" a brow "like Cain's or Christ's".

=== Stanzas 36–55 ===
The sense of despair and hopelessness continues. In Stanza 37 the poet muses over a just punishment for the "nameless worm" and "noteless blot" who is the anonymous (now known to be John Wilson Croker, not the editor, William Gifford) and highly critical reviewer of Keats's Endymion (1818), who, in Shelley's opinion, traumatised John Keats, worsening his condition. The worst punishment that Shelley can contrive is that such a scoundrel should live: "Live thou, whose infamy is not thy fame!/ Live!" Faced with the contradiction that he would wish a long life upon the miscreant who took his hero's life, in stanza 38 the poet bursts open the gates of consolation that are required of the pastoral elegy: "Nor let us weep that our delight is fled/ Far from these carrion kites." In stanza 39, he uses the imagery of worms as symbolic of death: "And cold hopes swarm like worms within our living clay." In stanzas 45 and 46, Shelley laments that—like Thomas Chatterton, Sir Philip Sidney, and Lucan—Keats died young and did not live to develop as a poet. Keats transcends human life and has been unified with the immortal: "He has outsoared the shadow of our night;/Envy and calumny and hate and pain,/ ... Can touch him not and torture not again.... He is made one with Nature." Keats is as one with Nature, the Power, the One, and the one Spirit.

Adonais "is not dead, he doth not sleep, he hath awaken'd from the dream of life." "Who mourns for Adonais?" he asks in stanza 47. Shelley turns his grief from Adonais to "we" who must live on and "decay/ Like corpses in a charnel," and after a series of stanzas (39–49) in which he celebrates the richer and fuller life that Adonais must now be experiencing, the poet becomes mindful that he is in Rome, itself a city rife with visible records of loss and decay. Moreover, he is in the Protestant cemetery there, where Shelley's three-year-old son is buried as well; and yet, as if mocking all despair, a "light of laughing flowers along the grass is spread." Nature does not abhor death and decay, he sees; it is humans, who fear and hate in the midst of life, who do. "What Adonais is, why fear we to become?" he asks in stanza 51.

It is life's worldly cares—that obscuring and distracting "dome of many-coloured glass"—not Death that is the enemy and the source of human despair. "Follow where all is fled," he urges, and he goads his own heart into having the courage to face not extinction but "that Light whose smile kindles the Universe." The poem concludes by imagining Adonais to be a part of "the white radiance of Eternity." At the end of the elegy, "like a star," the soul of the dead poet "Beacons from the abode where the Eternal are."

The section on Rome (stanzas 48–52) is significant in the poem not only because Keats and Shelley's son are buried in the Protestant cemetery there but also because the section offers an alternative way of understanding themes already expressed in the poem. Beginning with a statement of alternativeness ("Or go to Rome"), the section provides an alternative way for the continuing mourner to imagine Adonais as part of the World Soul and so cease mourning. To imagine this by means of the conceptual exercise prescribed in stanza 47 may be too difficult for the mourner, who may not be able to imagine omnipresence—presence at the same time throughout the whole of space as well as at each individual point in space—but who would be able to imagine eternality—presence in the same place throughout the whole of time or of history. This latter concept is embodied in the idea of Rome as the "Eternal" city. Since both Rome and the particular cemetery symbolise (through the imagery used) the dominance of eternity, the mourner can doubly conceive of Keats as part of eternity—as absorbed into it and diffused throughout it—and thus conceive of him as part of the World Soul, among whose aspects is eternity as well as omnipresence.

In addition, the description of Keats's spirit as part of "Eternal" Rome shows parallels with the earlier description, in stanzas 44–46, of his spirit becoming part of the "firmament" of eternal stars which are the immortal spirits of great poets. And in stanza 52, as "The One" is to the "many" and "heaven's light" is to "Earth's shadows" and the "white radiance of Eternity" is to multicolored Life, so "The glory" of the World Soul is to aspects of Rome that represent death but symbolise eternity. By means of these parallels, the Rome section becomes fully integrated into the poem.

== Notable performances ==
Mick Jagger of the Rolling Stones read a part of Adonais at the Brian Jones concert at London's Hyde Park on 5 July 1969. Jones, founder and guitarist of the Stones, had drowned 3 July 1969 in his swimming pool. Before an audience estimated at 250,000 to 300,000, Jagger read the following verses from Adonais:

Peace, peace! he is not dead, he doth not sleep
He hath awakened from the dream of life
'Tis we, who lost in stormy visions, keep
With phantoms an unprofitable strife,
And in mad trance, strike with our spirit's knife
Invulnerable nothings. — We decay
Like corpses in a charnel; fear and grief
Convulse us and consume us day by day,
And cold hopes swarm like worms within our living clay.

The One remains, the many change and pass;
Heaven's light forever shines, Earth's shadows fly;
Life, like a dome of many-coloured glass,
Stains the white radiance of Eternity,
Until Death tramples it to fragments. — Die,
If thou wouldst be with that which thou dost seek!
Follow where all is fled!

Actor Vincent Price read Adonais on a Caedmon Records recording which was released, originally in 1956, as an LP record and a cassette recording, Caedmon CPN 1059 and TC 1059. The recording was re-released in 1996.

The English rock band The Cure has recorded a song entitled "Adonais" based on the Shelley elegy as a B-side single and on the collection Join the Dots: B-Sides and Rarities, 1978–2001 (2004). "Adonais" was originally the B-side to "The 13th", released in 1996.

== Sources ==
- "Percy Shelley: Adonais", John Keats (12 February 2004). Retrieved 30 June 2005.
- Sandy, Mark. 'Adonais (1821)', The Literary Encyclopaedia (20 September 2002). Retrieved 30 June 2005.
- Beatty, Bernard. "The Transformation of Discourse: Epipsychidion, Adonais, and some lyrics". In: Essays on Shelley, ed. Miriam Allott. Liverpool University Press, 1982.
- Becht, Ronald E. "Shelley's Adonais: Formal Design and the Lyric Speaker's Crisis of Imagination". Studies in Philology, Vol. 78, No. 2 (Spring, 1981), pp. 194–210.
- Bertoneche, Caroline. "From Poet to Poet or Shelley's Inconsistencies in Keats's Panegyric: Adonais as an Autobiographical Work of Art", 15 June 2007. Retrieved 7 May 2009.
- Brigham, Linda C. (1999). "Disciplinary Hybridity in Shelley's Adonais." Mosaic (Winnipeg), Vol. 32.
- Epstein, Andrew. (1999). "'Flowers that Mock the Corse Beneath': Shelley's Adonais, Keats, and Poetic Influence." KSJ, 48, pp. 90–128.
- Everest, Kelvin. (2007). "Shelley's Adonais and John Keats." Essays in Criticism, 57(3), pp. 237–264.
- Heffernan, James A. W. "Adonais: Shelley's Consumption of Keats." Studies in Romanticism, Vol. 23, No. 3, Percy Bysshe Shelley (Fall, 1984), pp. 295–315.
- MacEachen, Dougald B. CliffsNotes on Shelley's Poems. 18 July 2011.
- Mahony, Patrick. J. (1964). "An Analysis of Shelley's Craftsmanship in Adonais." SEL: Studies in English Literature 1500–1900, 4. pp. 555–68.
- Meirelles, Alexandre. Adonais. Book Review. 26 August 2007.
- O'Leary, Joseph S. "Plotinus in 'Mont Blanc' and 'Adonais'." Essays on Literary and Theological Themes.
- Roberts, Charles G.D. Shelley's Adonais and Alastor. NY: Silver, Burdett, 1902.
- Sacks, Peter. "Last Clouds: A Reading of Adonais." Studies in Romanticism, Vol. 23, No. 3, Percy Bysshe Shelley (Fall, 1984), pp. 379–400.
- Sharp, Michele Turner. (Summer, 2000). "Mirroring the Future: Adonais, Elegy, and the Life in Letters." Criticism, 42, 3.
- Silverman, Edwin B. Poetic Synthesis in Shelley's Adonais. The Hague and Paris: Mouton, 1972.
- Ulmer, William A. "Adonais and the Death of Poetry." Studies in Romanticism, Vol. 32, No. 3, Romantic Historicism (Fall, 1993), pp. 425–451.
- Ward, J.V. (2003). "The Constant Theme of Death in the Works of Keats and Shelley."
- Weeks, Jerome. "O, weep for Adonais — for he is being adapted by Hollywood." book/daddy, Jerome Weeks on books.
