= Chris Doohan =

Canadian actor

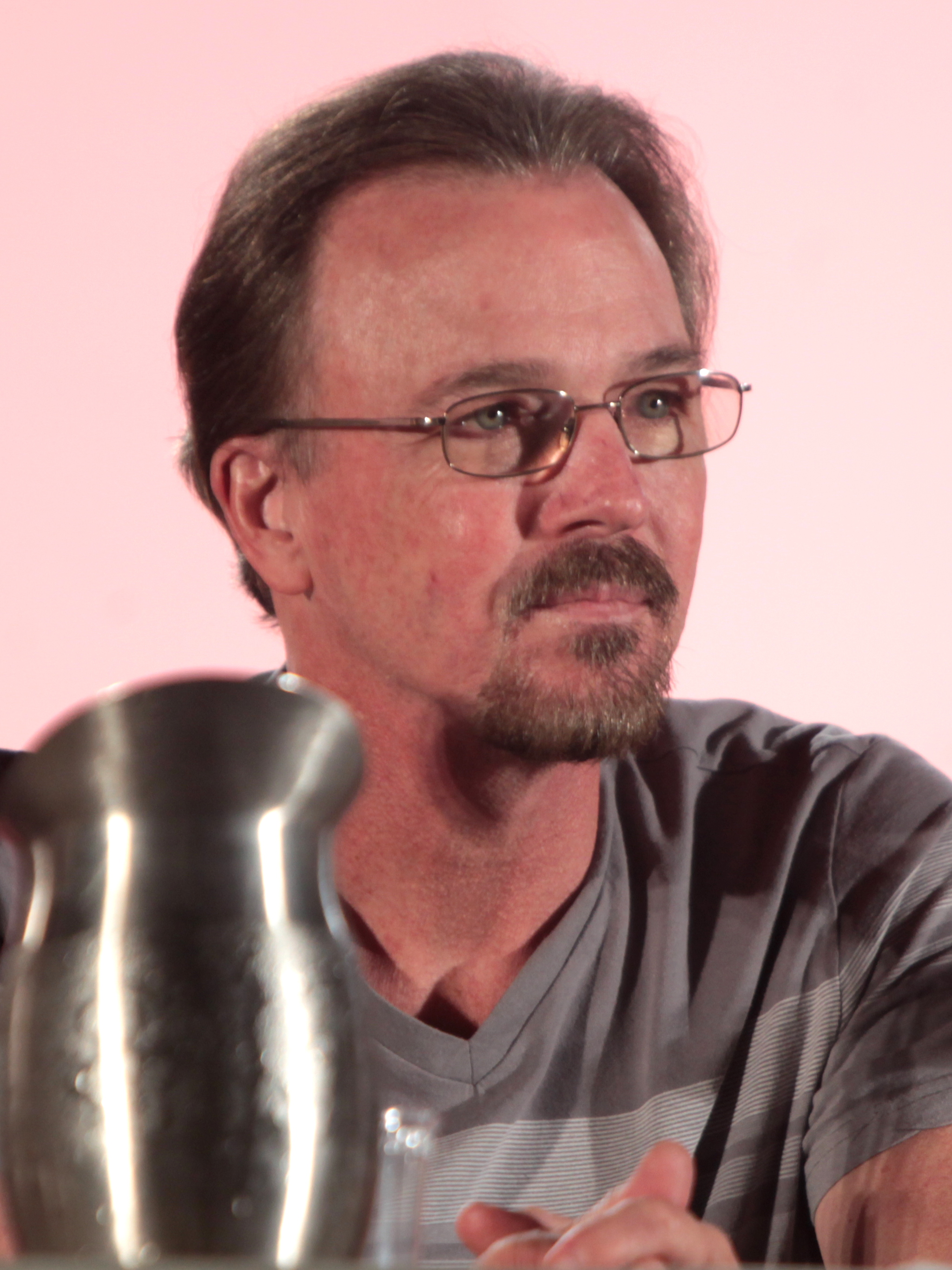
- Doohan at the 2015 Phoenix Comicon
- Born: Christopher Barrett Doohan; June 28, 1959 (age 67); Toronto, Ontario, Canada
- Occupation: Actor
- Years active: 1979–present
- Father: James Doohan

Christopher Barrett Doohan (born June 28, 1959) is a Canadian actor, one of twin sons of Star Trek actor James Doohan. Chris and his brother Montgomery made uncredited appearances as background extras in the first franchise movie: Star Trek: The Motion Picture.

== Career ==
Upon hearing that the role of Montgomery Scott would be recast for J. J. Abrams' film, Star Trek fans started a campaign asking other fans to write to Paramount Pictures in an attempt to persuade the studio and the filmmakers to allow either of the two brothers to play their father's role in the film, or, at the very least, to be extras in the film as they were for The Motion Picture.

The role of Scotty in the new film went to British actor Simon Pegg, but on November 5, 2007 it was announced that Doohan had auditioned for a "minor speaking role" in the film. Doohan stated he would not have even been given an audition had it not been for the support of the fans. He appeared alongside Scotty, assisting him in operating the transporter controls during the mission to the Narada. In 2012, it was announced that Chris Doohan won a credited speaking role in Star Trek Into Darkness as a Transport Officer.

In 2012, it was announced that Doohan would play Scotty in Star Trek Continues, a web-based film series. The first episode "Pilgrim of Eternity" premiered at the Phoenix Comicon to a crowd of over 3,500 fans. With most of the cast in attendance, they signed posters in the lobby for almost three hours. The second episode, "Lolani", premiered in March 2014 at the Dallas, Texas Comic Con. The episode also stars Lou Ferrigno and Erin Gray. He also appears as Scotty in Star Trek Online, with a major appearance in the "Agents of Yesterday" expansion pack released in July 2016.

== Partial filmography ==
=== Film ===
- Star Trek: The Motion Picture (1979) - Enterprise Crewmember (uncredited)
- Star Trek (2009) - Starfleet Officer (uncredited)
- Star Trek Into Darkness (2013) - Transport Officer
- Star Trek Continues (web series, 2013–2017) - Montgomery "Scotty" Scott

=== Video games ===
- Star Trek Online - Montgomery "Scotty" Scott
