= Bjo Awards =

Independent Star Trek fan film awards

The Bjo Awards
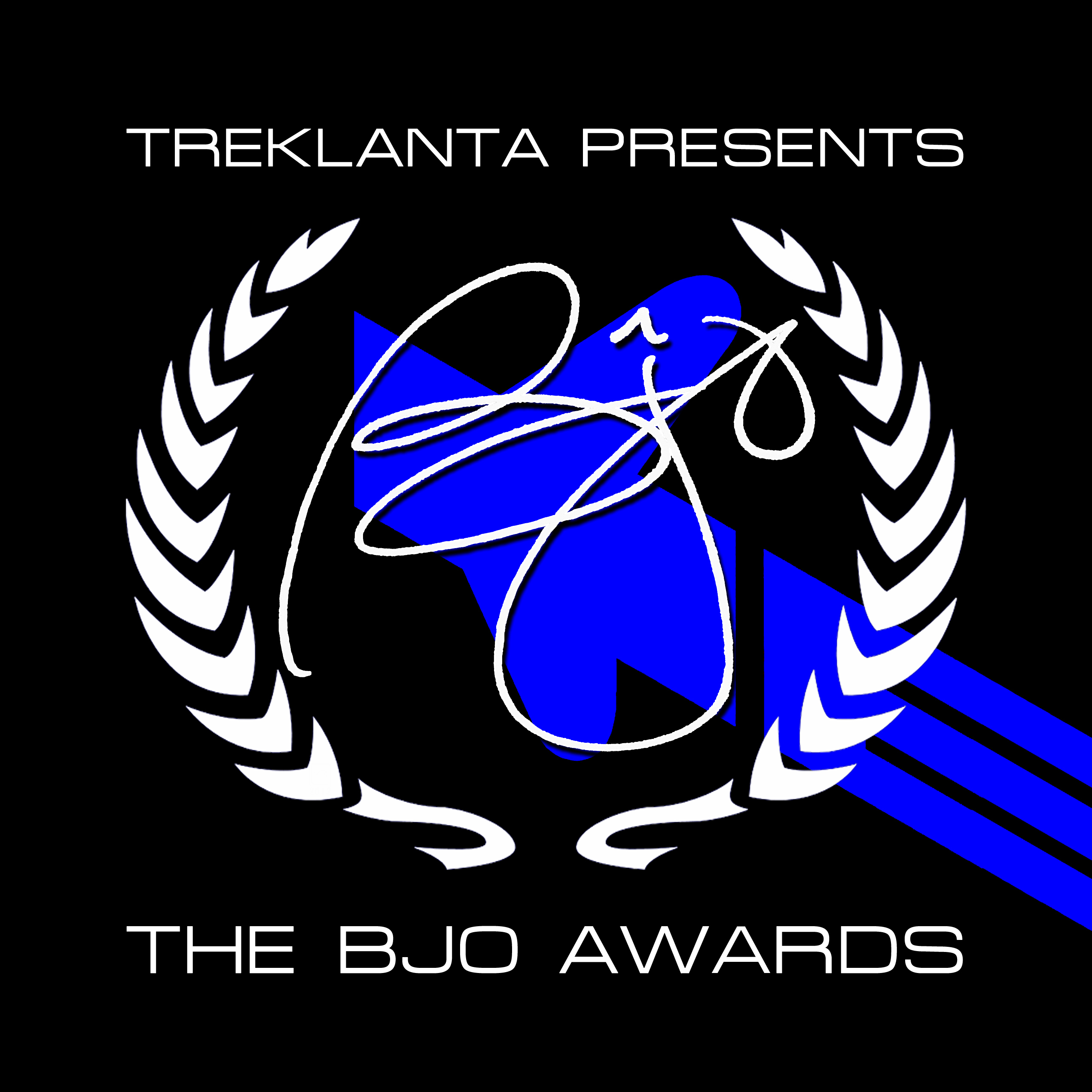
- Designed & Created by Eric L. Watts, 2018
- Awarded for: Achievement in excellence among independent Star Trek fan films
- Country: United States
- Presented by: Treklanta
- First award: April 26, 2015; 11 years ago
- Website: The Bjo Awards

The Bjo Awards (formerly The Independent Star Trek Fan Film Awards) is a set of annual awards to recognize achievement in excellence among independent Star Trek fan films released to the Internet during the previous calendar year. Inspired by the Hugo and Nebula Awards and based loosely on the Emmy, Oscar and Tony Awards, the Bjo Awards are presented at the annual Treklanta convention in Atlanta, Georgia. Created and produced by Treklanta founder and chairman Eric L. Watts, the Bjo Awards is a juried competition judged by a panel of industry professionals with established credits in the Star Trek franchise and/or notable Star Trek fans with professional experience in the entertainment industry.

Bjo Trimble—who coordinated the letter-writing campaigns that successfully saved the original Star Trek series from cancellation at the end of its second season and petitioned President Gerald R. Ford to rename NASA's first space orbiter "USS Enterprise" and who also wrote The Star Trek Concordance—and her husband John were guests of honor at the 2016 Treklanta and presenters of awards at that year's Independent Star Trek Fan Film Awards ceremony. At the end of the ceremony, Mrs. Trimble told Watts how impressed she was with the awards program, thanked all those who were involved in their creation, production and presentation, and graciously agreed, at Watts' request, to lend her name to them. The announcement of this name change was made at the 2017 awards ceremony and fully implemented by the time of the 2018 ceremony.

The actual award is an 8 x 10 wall plaque on a cherry wood board with a color back plate and sublimated inscription plate. Each plaque includes the award category; series name, episode title and name(s) of the winners; and date of the award inscribed on the inscription plate.

== Eligibility requirements ==
To be eligible for consideration in each year's awards, an independent Star Trek fan film must:

1. Be a live-action dramatic presentation set in the Star Trek universe, not animated or CGI, nor a satire or parody of Star Trek
2. Have "Based upon Star Trek, Created by Gene Roddenberry" (or similar) in the title sequence, opening credits or closing credits (Note: This requirement may be waived under certain circumstances at the sole discretion of Treklanta management. To date, the only film to be exempted from this requirement is "Prelude to Axanar" due to its "mockumentary" format)
3. Have been released to the Internet (YouTube, Vimeo, etc.) during the previous calendar year, and
4. Have an entry on IMDb.com with full cast and crew credits listed (Note: For awards presented to individuals, nominees must be listed on those films' IMDb page)

Although not explicitly stated as a requirement, only films in English or with English subtitles have been included in these awards due to the practical matter of judges not speaking the language of foreign-language films which otherwise meet all four eligibility requirements.

== 2015 ==
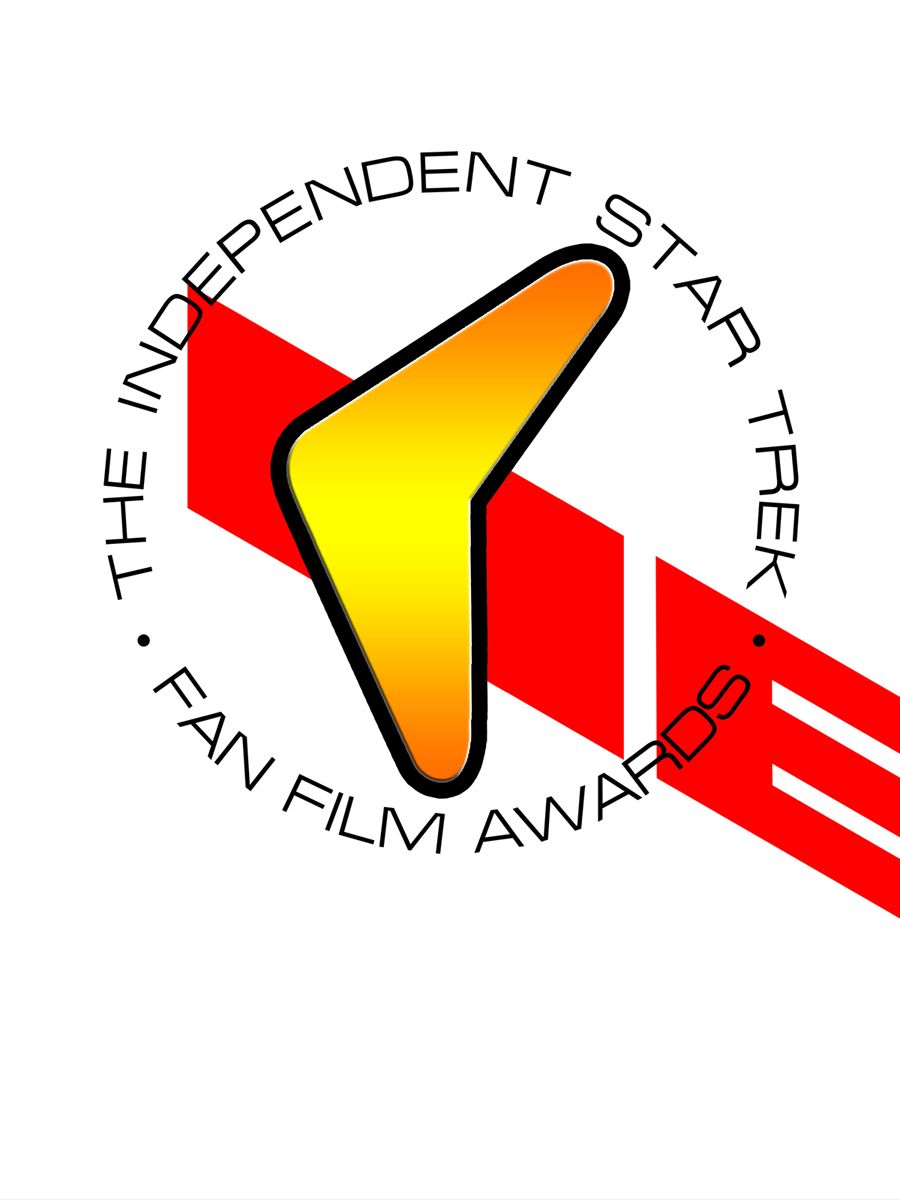
Original logo for the Independent Star Trek Fan Film Awards, 2015-2017

Sixteen independent Star Trek fan films released in calendar year 2014 with a total running time of eight hours, five minutes were deemed eligible for consideration for the 2015 Independent Star Trek Fan Film Awards.

Based loosely on the Emmy, Oscar and Tony awards, the original nine categories were Best Production Design; Best Visual Effects; Best Soundtrack; Best Original Story or Screenplay; Best Supporting Actor or Actress; Best Actor or Actress; Best Director; Best Dramatic Presentation, Short Form (30 minutes or less); and Best Dramatic Presentation, Long Form (31 minutes or longer).

The panel of judges for the 2015 awards included Diana Dru Botsford, Peter David, Keith R. A. DeCandido, Michael DeMeritt and Susan Sackett. The awards ceremony was held at Treklanta on April 26, 2015, hosted by Eric L. Watts and Brian Holloway. Awards presenters included Jason Carter, Keith R. A. DeCandido, Sean Kenney and Anne Lockhart.

=== Films eligible for consideration ===
Release Date	Series Name	Episode Title	Online Video	Run Time
1/8/2014	Star Trek Continues	"Lolani" (Note: Star Trek Continues, "Lolani" on IMDb)	Star Trek Continues, "Lolani" on YouTube	0:50:54
1/13/2014	Project: Potemkin	"The Night the Stars Fell from the Sky" (Note: Project: Potemkin, "The Night the Stars Fell from the Sky" on IMDb)	Project: Potemkin, "The Night the Stars Fell from the Sky" on YouTube	0:54:46
1/31/2014	Star Trek: Rendezvous	"The Inquiry" (Note: Star Trek: Rendezvous, "The Inquiry" on IMDb)	Star Trek: Rendezvous, "The Inquiry" on YouTube	0:16:25
4/5/2014	Star Trek: Secret Voyage	"Rise of the Gongdea" (Note: Star Trek: Secret Voyage, "Rise of the Gongdea" on IMDb)	Star Trek: Secret Voyage, "Rise of the Gongdea" on YouTube	0:35:14
5/1/2014	Starship Exeter	"The Tressaurian Intersection" (Note: Starship Exeter, "The Tressaurian Intersection" on IMDb)	Starship Exeter, "The Tressaurian Intersection" on YouTube	0:51:46
5/28/2014	Star Trek: Reliant	"Supply and Demand" (Note: Star Trek: Reliant, "Supply and Demand" on IMDb)	Star Trek: Reliant, "Supply and Demand" on YouTube	0:22:23
6/15/2014	Star Trek Continues	"Fairest of Them All" (Note: Star Trek Continues, "Fairest of Them All" on IMDb)	Star Trek Continues, "Fairest of Them All" on YouTube	0:40:33
6/22/2014	Star Trek Nature's Hunger	"Star Trek Encounters Silence of the Lambs" (Note: Star Trek Natures Hunger, "Star Trek Encounters Silence of the Lambs" on IMDb)	Star Trek Nature's Hunger, "Star Trek Encounters Silence of the Lambs" on YouTube	0:09:45
7/4/2014	Starship Valiant	"Legacy" (Note: Starship Valiant, "Legacy" on IMDb)	Starship Valiant, "Legacy" on YouTube	0:19:47
7/14/2014	Project: Potemkin	"Command Decision" (Note: Project: Potemkin, "Command Decision" on IMDb)	Project: Potemkin, "Command Decision" on YouTube	0:06:14
8/4/2014	Starship Farragut	"Conspiracy of Innocence" (Note: Starship Farragut, "Conspiracy of Innocence" on IMDb)	Starship Farragut, "Conspiracy of Innocence" on YouTube	0:37:19
8/15/2014	Star Trek: Axanar	"Prelude to Axanar" (Note: Star Trek: Axanar, "Prelude to Axanar" on IMDb)	Star Trek: Axanar, "Prelude to Axanar" on YouTube	0:21:09
9/29/2014	Star Trek: Reliant	"Stalemate" (Note: Star Trek: Reliant, "Stalemate" on IMDb)	Star Trek: Reliant, "Stalemate" on YouTube	0:06:17
10/31/2014	Star Trek Nature's Hunger	"Dorothy's Awesome Shuttlecraft Adventure" (Note: Star Trek Natures Hunger, "Dorothy's Awesome Shuttlecraft Adventure" on IMDb)	Star Trek Nature's Hunger, "Dorothy's Awesome Shuttlecraft Adventure" on YouTube	0:22:26
11/11/2014	Project: Potemkin	"Holding Pattern" (Note: Project: Potemkin, "Holding Pattern" on IMDb)	Project: Potemkin, "Holding Pattern" on YouTube	0:12:13
12/24/2014	Star Trek New Voyages: Phase II	"Mind-Sifter" (Note: Star Trek New Voyages: Phase II, "Mind-Sifter" on IMDb)	Star Trek New Voyages: Phase II, "Mind-Sifter" on YouTube	1:17:48

=== Winners & finalists by category ===
Best Production Design
Series Name	Production Designer(s)	Result
Star Trek: Axanar	Scott Cobb	Winner
Star Trek Continues	Vic Mignogna	Finalist
Star Trek New Voyages: Phase II	James Cawley	Finalist
Starship Exeter	Joel Sarchet, David Weiberg	Finalist

Best Visual Effects
Series Name	Visual Effects Designer(s)/Artist(s)	Result
Star Trek: Axanar	Stefan Bellersheim, Al Dinelt, Adam Howard, Tommy Kraft, Koji Kuramura, Thomas Loeder, Chris Martin, Jennifer Marx, Oliver Nikelowski, Tobias Richter, Ali Ries, Arnold Sakowski, Trent Smith, Greg Stitz, Dan Uyeno, Enrico Weinert	Winner
Star Trek Continues	Roland Baron, Matt Boardman, Aurore de Blois, Daniel Dod, Doug Drexler, Brian Q. Kelley, Gary Kerr, Gabriel Köerner, Ali Ries, Roland Shaw, Kenneth Thomson Jr., Juvenal Vique	Finalist
Star Trek New Voyages: Phase II	Bing Bailey, Ryan Block, Daren Dochterman, Jeff Forsythe, Pony R. Horton, Tobias Richter, Lee Stringer	Finalist
Star Trek: Secret Voyage	Craig F. Sheeler	Finalist
Starship Exeter	Dennis Bailey, Matt Bellemare, Neil Breakwell, Bill Grant, Jimm Johnson, Chet Polo, Art Retallick, Joel Sarchet, Patricia Sasser, Thomas Sasser, Michael Struck, Kenneth Thomson Jr., Mel Vavaroutsos, David Weiberg, Zane Yarbrough	Finalist
Starship Valiant	Brady Foster, Craig Frey Jr.	Finalist

Best Soundtrack
Series Name	Individuals	Result
Star Trek: Axanar	Alexander Bornstein (Composer), Frank Serafine (Supervising Sound Designer/Editor), Jesse Akins (Sound Designer), Ramsey Mellette (Sound Mixer)	Winner
Star Trek Continues	Vic Mignogna, Ralph M. Miller, Michelle Siles, Fred Steiner	Finalist
Star Trek New Voyages: Phase II	George Duning, Gerald Fried, Sol Kaplan, Mark Edward Lewis, Joseph Mullendore, Fred Steiner (Composers); Jeff Bond (Music Editor)	Finalist
Starship Exeter	Christopher Budd, Stephen Cadena, Stan Ginsley, Hetoryn, Graham Hutchins	Finalist

Best Original Story or Screenplay
Series Name	Episode Title	Authors/Writers	Result
Star Trek: Axanar	"Prelude to Axanar"	Christian Gossett, Alec Peters	Winner
Star Trek Continues	"Fairest of Them All"	James Kerwin, Vic Mignogna	Finalist
Star Trek Continues	"Lolani"	Paul Bianchi, Huston Huddleston, Vic Mignogna	Finalist
Star Trek New Voyages: Phase II	"Mind-Sifter"	Rick Chambers, Shirley Maiewski	Finalist
Starship Exeter	"The Tressaurian Intersection"	Dennis Bailey, Joshua Caleb, Jimm Johnson, Maurice Molyneaux	Finalist

Best Supporting Actor or Actress
Actor or Actress	Character	Series Name	Result
Clay Sayre	Kor	Star Trek New Voyages: Phase II	Winner
April Chamberlain	Ensign Torres	Starship Valiant	Finalist
Robert Withrow	Admiral Withrow	Star Trek New Voyages: Phase II	Finalist
Rivkah Raven Wood	Dr. Hamlin	Star Trek New Voyages: Phase II	Finalist

Best Actor or Actress
Actor or Actress	Character	Series Name	Result
Vic Mignogna	Captain James T. Kirk	Star Trek Continues	Winner
Richard Hatch	Commander Kharn	Star Trek: Axanar	Finalist
J. G. Hertzler	Admiral Samuel Travis	Star Trek: Axanar	Finalist
Tony Todd	Admiral Marcus Ramirez	Star Trek: Axanar	Finalist

Best Director
Director	Series Name	Episode Title	Result
Christian Gossett	Star Trek: Axanar	"Prelude to Axanar"	Winner
James Kerwin	Star Trek Continues	"Fairest of Them All"	Finalist
Mark Edward Lewis	Star Trek New Voyages: Phase II	"Mind-Sifter"	Finalist
Chris White	Star Trek Continues	"Lolani"	Finalist

Best Dramatic Presentation, Short Form
Series Name	Episode Title	Result
Star Trek: Axanar	"Prelude to Axanar"	Winner
Project: Potemkin	"Command Decision"	Finalist
Project: Potemkin	"Holding Pattern"	Finalist
Starship Valiant	"Legacy"	Finalist

Best Dramatic Presentation, Long Form
Series Name	Episode Title	Result
Star Trek Continues	"Fairest of Them All"	Winner
Starship Farragut	"Conspiracy of Innocence"	Finalist
Star Trek Continues	"Lolani"	Finalist
Star Trek New Voyages: Phase II	"Mind-Sifter"	Finalist

=== Summary ===
Star Trek: Axanar won six of nine awards (Best Production Design; Best Visual Effects; Best Soundtrack; Best Original Story or Screenplay; Best Director and Best Dramatic Presentation, Short Form), Star Trek Continues won two awards (Best Actor or Actress and Best Dramatic Presentation, Long Form) and Star Trek New Voyages: Phase II won one award (Best Supporting Actor or Actress).

== 2016 ==
Eighteen independent Star Trek fan films released in calendar year 2015 with a total running time of six hours, fifty minutes were deemed eligible for consideration for the 2016 Independent Star Trek Fan Film Awards.

For 2016, the category of Best Visual Effects was broadened to include Special Effects and renamed Best Special & Visual Effects, and Best Actor or Actress was renamed Best Lead Actor or Actress. Additionally, the Best Soundtrack category was split into Best Original Music and Best Sound Design, Editing & Mixing; and categories for Best Guest Actor or Actress, Best Costuming and Best Makeup & Hairstyling were added, increasing the total number of categories from nine to thirteen.

The panel of judges for the 2016 awards included Diana Dru Botsford, Keith R. A. DeCandido, Ken Feinberg, Matthew M. Foster, Andrew Greenberg, David Orange, Emmett Plant and Rick Sternbach. The awards ceremony was held at Treklanta on April 17, 2016, hosted by Eric L. Watts and Brian Holloway. Awards presenters included Tracee Lee Cocco, Jack Stauffer, Carel Struycken and John & Bjo Trimble.

=== Films eligible for consideration ===
Release Date	Series Name	Episode Title	Online Video	Run Time
1/10/2015	Star Trek Nature's Hunger	"Why Toto Can't Join Starfleet" (Note: Star Trek: Natures Hunger, "Why Toto Can't Join Starfleet" on IMDb)	Star Trek Nature's Hunger, "Why Toto Can't Join Starfleet" on YouTube	0:13:01
1/30/2015	Project: Potemkin	"We Few..." (Note: Project: Potemkin, "We Few..." on IMDb)	Project: Potemkin, "We Few..." on YouTube	0:11:01
3/15/2015	Project: Potemkin	"Frazier's Angels" (Note: Project: Potemkin, "Frazier's Angels" on IMDb)	Project: Potemkin, "Frazier's Angels" on YouTube	0:08:07
3/27/2015	Project: Potemkin	"The Chair" (Note: Project: Potemkin, "The Chair" on IMDb)	Project: Potemkin, "The Chair" on YouTube	0:06:14
4/29/2015	Star Trek Nature's Hunger	"The Starfleet Screw Up" (Note: Star Trek: Natures Hunger, "The Starfleet Screw Up" on IMDb)	Star Trek Nature's Hunger, "The Starfleet Screw Up" on YouTube	0:09:15
6/19/2015	Star Trek Continues	"The White Iris" (Note: Star Trek Continues, "The White Iris" on IMDb)	Star Trek Continues, "The White Iris" on YouTube	0:47:54
7/7/2015	Project: Potemkin	"Third Watch" (Note: Project: Potemkin, "Third Watch" on IMDb)	Project: Potemkin, "Third Watch" on YouTube	0:07:06
8/9/2015	Project: Potemkin	"Do No Harm" (Note: Project: Potemkin, "Do No Harm" on IMDb)	Project: Potemkin, "Do No Harm" on YouTube	0:12:44
8/24/2015	Star Trek: Renegades	"Pilot" (Note: Star Trek: Renegades, "Pilot" on IMDb)	Star Trek: Renegades, "Pilot" on YouTube	1:28:04
9/3/2015	Star Trek: Intrepid	"Transposition" (Note: Star Trek: Intrepid, "Transposition" on IMDb)	Star Trek: Intrepid, "Transposition" on YouTube	0:06:26
9/13/2015	Battlecruiser Kupok	"Battle of Alawanir" (Note: Battlecruiser Kupok, "Battle of Alawanir" on IMDb)	Battlecruiser Kupok, "Battle of Alawanir" on YouTube	0:13:22
9/20/2015	Project: Potemkin	"Ladies Night Out" (Note: Project: Potemkin, "Ladies Night Out" on IMDb)	Project: Potemkin, "Ladies Night Out" on YouTube	0:08:17
9/26/2015	Star Trek Continues	"Divided We Stand" (Note: Star Trek Continues, "Divided We Stand" on IMDb)	Star Trek Continues, "Divided We Stand" on YouTube	0:42:45
10/2/2015	Dreadnought Dominion	"Anchors Aweigh" (Note: Dreadnought Dominion, "Anchors Aweigh" on IMDb) and "Haunted" (Note: Dreadnought Dominion, "Haunted" on IMDb)	Dreadnought Dominion, "Anchors Aweigh" and "Haunted" on YouTube	0:36:03
12/8/2015	Starship Tristan	"Moving Day" (Note: Starship Tristan, "Moving Day" on IMDb)	Starship Tristan, "Moving Day" on YouTube	0:10:38
12/24/2015	Star Trek: Eye of the Tempest	"Part 1" (Note: Star Trek: Eye of the Tempest, "Part 1" on IMDb)	Star Trek: Eye of the Tempest, "Part 1" on Vimeo	0:35:40
12/29/2015	Star Trek: Eye of the Tempest	"Part 2" (Note: Star Trek: Eye of the Tempest, "Part 2" on IMDb)	Star Trek: Eye of the Tempest, "Part 2" on Vimeo	0:31:37
12/31/2015	Star Trek Nature's Hunger	"Scorned at the Captain's Table" (Note: Star Trek: Natures Hunger, "Scorned at the Captain's Table" on IMDb)	Star Trek Nature's Hunger, "Scorned at the Captain's Table" on YouTube	0:21:14

=== Winners & finalists by category ===
Best Production Design
Series Name	Episode Title(s)	Production Designer(s)	Result
Star Trek: Renegades	"Pilot"	Scott Nakada	Winner
Star Trek Continues	"Divided We Stand," "The White Iris"	Vic Mignogna	Finalist
Star Trek: Eye of the Tempest	"Part 1" and "Part 2"	George Beau Kayaian, Kenneth Thomson Jr.	Finalist
Star Trek: Intrepid	"Transposition"	Nicholas J. Cook	Finalist

Best Special & Visual Effects
Series Name	Episode Title	Special & Visual Effects Designer(s)/Artist(s)	Result
Star Trek: Renegades	"Pilot"	Bing Bailey, Roland Baron, Keith Beltramini, Matt Boardman, Chris Dawson, Keaira Finlay, Justin Gates, Adrianne Grady, Marc Hampson, Tommy Kraft, Gina Lockhart, Jon Macht, Jose L. Marin, Julie McCartney, Kevin Quattro, Tobias Richter, Ali Ries, Michael Struck, Ronnie Ursenbach, Yoshi Vu, Jesse Woodward	Winner
Star Trek Continues	"Divided We Stand"	Roland Baron, Matt Boardman, Glenn Campbell, Daniel Dod, Doug Drexler, Matthew Gabriel, Tammy Klein, Randy Little	Finalist
Star Trek Continues	"The White Iris"	Roland Baron, Matt Boardman, Daniel Dod, Doug Drexler, Randy Little, Ali Ries, Sam Rooks, Kenneth Thomson Jr., Royal Weaver	Finalist
Star Trek: Intrepid	"Transposition"	Lee Andrew, Jon Carling, Martin Lejeune	Finalist

Best Sound Design, Editing & Mixing
Series Name	Episode Title(s)	Sound Designer(s)/Editor(s)/Mixer(s)	Result
Star Trek: Renegades	"Pilot"	Adrianne Grady, Tom Haigh, Ralph M. Miller	Winner
Star Trek Continues	"Divided We Stand"	Mark Cochran, Adrianne Grady, Ralph M. Miller	Finalist
Star Trek Continues	"The White Iris"	Ben Burtt, Douglas H. Grindstaff, Ralph M. Miller	Finalist
Star Trek Nature's Hunger	"The Starfleet Screw Up," "Scorned at the Captain's Table"	Rob Lopez	Finalist

Best Original Music
Series Name	Episode Title(s)	Musician(s)	Result
Star Trek Continues	"The White Iris"	Ivan Ditmars, George Duning, Andy Farber, Gerald Fried, Vic Mignogna	Winner
Project: Potemkin	"Do No Harm," "Frazier's Angels," "Ladies Night Out," "The Chair," "Third Watch," "We Few..."	Tony Lunn	Finalist
Star Trek: Intrepid	"Transposition"	Bodo Hartwig	Finalist
Star Trek: Renegades	"Pilot"	Justin R. Durban	Finalist

Best Makeup & Hairstyling
Series Name	Episode Title	Makeup Artist(s)/Hairstylist(s)	Result
Star Trek: Renegades	"Pilot"	Rick L. Baker, Jacqueline Goehner, Lisa Hansell, Kwame Head, Corina Hernandez, Ryan T. Husk, Jyll King, Ana Laverde, Christy Maurer, Monique Paredes, Tommy Pietch, Calli Rammel, Vyvy Tran, Tim Vittetoe, Cody J. Wilkins, Aubriana Zurilgen	Winner
Battlecruiser Kupok	"Battle of Alawanir"	Eric Holt, Ashley Longacre	Finalist
Star Trek Continues	"Divided We Stand"	Najla Arrington, Byron Batista, Shaquanta Green, Stephanie Hall, Lisa Hansell, Tim Vittetoe, Hayley Warner, Randilee Warner, Scotty Whitehurst	Finalist
Star Trek Continues	"The White Iris"	Najla Arrington, Byron Batista, Shaquanta Green, Stephanie Hall, Lisa Hansell, Monique Hyman, April Metcalf, Michele Specht, Tim Vittetoe, Hayley Warner, Randilee Warner	Finalist

Best Costuming
Series Name	Episode Title(s)	Costumer(s)	Result
Star Trek: Renegades	"Pilot"	Jodi Freeman, Deborah Hartwell, Chen Chheav Ly	Winner
Star Trek Continues	"The White Iris"	Hannah Barucky, Dorothy Booraem, Ginger Holley	Finalist
Star Trek: Eye of the Tempest	"Part 1" and "Part 2"	John Broughton, Kim Haas, John Sims	Finalist
Star Trek: Intrepid	"Transposition"	Nicholas J. Cook	Finalist

Best Guest Actor or Actress
Actor or Actress	Character	Series Name	Episode Title	Result
Colin Baker	Amphidamas	Star Trek Continues	"The White Iris"	Winner
Martin Bradford	Dr. M'Benga	Star Trek Continues	"Divided We Stand"	Finalist
Tiffany Brouwer	Miramanee	Star Trek Continues	"The White Iris"	Finalist
David M. Graham	Dr. Sam Anderson	Starship Tristan	"Moving Day"	Finalist
Eric L. Watts	Korgoth	Project: Potemkin	"Ladies Night Out"	Finalist

Best Supporting Actor or Actress
Actor or Actress	Character(s)	Series Name	Episode Title(s)	Result
Michele Specht	Dr. Elise McKennah	Star Trek Continues	"Divided We Stand", "The White Iris"	Winner
John Carrigan	Admiral D'Agosto and Klingon Captain	Star Trek: Renegades	"Pilot"	Finalist
Kevin Fry	Jaro Ruk	Star Trek: Renegades	"Pilot"	Finalist
Grant Imahara	Sulu	Star Trek Continues	"Divided We Stand", "The White Iris"	Finalist
Wyatt Lenhart	Chekov	Star Trek Continues	"Divided We Stand", "The White Iris"	Finalist
Vic Mignogna	Garis	Star Trek: Renegades	"Pilot"	Finalist

Best Lead Actor or Actress
Actor or Actress	Character	Series Name	Episode Title(s)	Result
Todd Haberkorn	Mr. Spock	Star Trek Continues	"Divided We Stand", "The White Iris"	Winner
Walter Koenig	Admiral Chekov	Star Trek: Renegades	"Pilot"	Finalist
Vic Mignogna	Captain James T. Kirk	Star Trek Continues	"Divided We Stand", "The White Iris"	Finalist
Adrienne Wilkinson	Lexxa Singh	Star Trek: Renegades	"Pilot"	Finalist

Best Director
Director	Series Name	Episode Title	Result
Tim Russ	Star Trek: Renegades	"Pilot"	Winner
Joe Cepeda	Star Trek Nature's Hunger	"The Starfleet Screw Up"	Finalist
James Kerwin	Star Trek Continues	"The White Iris"	Finalist
Vic Mignogna	Star Trek Continues	"Divided We Stand"	Finalist

Best Original Story or Screenplay
Series Name	Episode Title	Author(s)/Writer(s)	Result
Star Trek: Renegades	"Pilot"	Ethan H. Calk, Sky Douglas Conway, Jack Treviño	Winner
Star Trek Continues	"Divided We Stand"	Marc Cushman, Vic Mignogna, Susan Osborn	Finalist
Star Trek Continues	"The White Iris"	James Kerwin, Vic Mignogna, Chris White	Finalist
Star Trek: Intrepid	"Transposition"	Nicholas J. Cook	Finalist

Best Dramatic Presentation, Short Form
Series Name	Episode Title	Result
Starship Tristan	"Moving Day"	Winner
Battlecruiser Kupok	"Battle of Alawanir"	Finalist
Project: Potemkin	"We Few..."	Finalist
Star Trek: Intrepid	"Transposition"	Finalist
Star Trek Nature's Hunger	"Scorned at the Captain's Table"	Finalist

Best Dramatic Presentation, Long Form
Series Name	Episode Title	Result
Star Trek Continues	"The White Iris"	Winner
Star Trek Continues	"Divided We Stand"	Finalist
Star Trek: Renegades	"Pilot"	Finalist

=== Summary ===
Star Trek: Renegades won seven of thirteen awards (Best Production Design; Best Special & Visual Effects; Best Sound Design, Editing & Mixing; Best Makeup & Hairstyling; Best Costuming; Best Director and Best Original Story or Screenplay), Star Trek Continues won five awards (Best Original Music; Best Guest Actor or Actress; Best Supporting Actor or Actress; Best Lead Actor or Actress and Best Dramatic Presentation, Long Form) and Starship Tristan won one award (Best Dramatic Presentation, Short Form).

== 2017 ==
Thirty-three independent Star Trek fan films released in calendar year 2016 with a total running time of eleven hours, forty-nine minutes were deemed eligible for consideration for the 2017 Independent Star Trek Fan Film Awards.

For 2017, the category of Best Production Design was deleted, decreasing the total number of categories from thirteen to twelve.

The panel of judges for the 2017 awards included Diana Dru Botsford, Keith R. A. DeCandido, John DeSentis, Matthew M. Foster, Andrew Greenberg, Robert Greenberger, Cheralyn Lambeth and Archie H. Waugh. The awards ceremony was held at Treklanta on April 30, 2017, hosted by Eric L. Watts and Brian Holloway. Awards presenters included David Gerrold, James Horan, Gary Graham and John G. Hertzler.

=== Films eligible for consideration ===
Release Date	Series Name	Episode Title	Online Video	Run Time
1/17/2016	Needs of the Many (Note: Needs of the Many on IMDb)		Needs of the Many on YouTube	0:06:28
1/31/2016	Star Trek: New Voyages	"The Holiest Thing" (Note: Star Trek: New Voyages, "The Holiest Thing" on IMDb)	Star Trek: New Voyages, "The Holiest Thing" on YouTube	1:03:53
2/26/2016	Star Trek: Horizon (Note: Star Trek: Horizon on IMDb)		Star Trek: Horizon on YouTube	1:42:35
3/9/2016	Starship Deimos	"The Lucky One" (Note: Starship Deimos, "The Lucky One" on IMDb)	Starship Deimos, "The Lucky One" on YouTube	0:07:05
3/12/2016	Starship Farragut	"The Crossing" (Note: Starship Farragut, "The Crossing" on IMDb)	Starship Farragut, "The Crossing" on YouTube	1:12:37
3/16/2016	Red Shirt (Note: Red Shirt on IMDb)		Red Shirt on YouTube	0:24:31
3/28/2016	Battlecruiser Kupok	"Sanctuary" (Note: Battlecruiser Kupok, "Sanctuary" on IMDb)	Battlecruiser Kupok, "Sanctuary" on YouTube	0:07:56
4/2/2016	Star Trek Nature's Hunger	"The Darkside of Starfleet Justice" (Note: Star Trek: Natures Hunger, "The Darkside of Starfleet Justice" on IMDb)	Star Trek Nature's Hunger, "The Darkside of Starfleet Justice" on YouTube	0:15:42
4/3/2016	Star Trek: Intrepid	"Nemo Me Impune Lacessit" (Note: Star Trek: Intrepid, "Nemo Me Impune Lacessit" on IMDb)	Star Trek: Intrepid, "Nemo Me Impune Lacessit" on YouTube	0:11:10
4/10/2016	Starship Tristan	"Relics and Regrets" (Note: Starship Tristan, "Relics and Regrets" on IMDb)	Starship Tristan, "Relics and Regrets" on YouTube	0:07:14
4/17/2016	Project: Potemkin	"The Last Child" (Note: Project: Potemkin, "The Last Child" on IMDb)	Project: Potemkin, "The Last Child" on YouTube	0:20:53
4/21/2016	Starship Deimos	"Aftermath" (Note: Starship Deimos, "Aftermath" on IMDb)	Starship Deimos, "Aftermath" on YouTube	0:06:09
4/27/2016	Project: Potemkin	"The Talinar Incident" (Note: Project: Potemkin, "The Talinar Incident" on IMDb)	Project: Potemkin, "The Talinar Incident" on YouTube	0:08:11
5/4/2016	Project: Potemkin	"The Hunt" (Note: Project: Potemkin, "The Hunt" on IMDb)	Project: Potemkin, "The Hunt" on YouTube	0:10:31
5/28/2016	Star Trek Continues	"Come Not Between the Dragons" (Note: Star Trek Continues, "Come Not Between the Dragons" on IMDb)	Star Trek Continues, "Come Not Between the Dragons" on YouTube	0:42:20
5/31/2016	Project: Potemkin	"Inquiry" (Note: Project: Potemkin, "Inquiry" on IMDb)	Project: Potemkin, "Inquiry" on YouTube	0:05:39
6/9/2016	Star Trek: Revenge (Note: Star Trek: Revenge on IMDb)		Star Trek: Revenge on YouTube	0:02:00
6/28/2016	Starship Tristan	"The Chronicles of Lanclos" (Note: Starship Tristan, "The Chronicles of Lanclos" on IMDb)	Starship Tristan, "The Chronicles of Lanclos" on YouTube	0:08:59
7/17/2016	Project: Potemkin	"All in a Day's Work" (Note: Project: Potemkin, "All in a Day's Work" on IMDb)	Project: Potemkin, "All in a Day's Work" on YouTube	0:08:27
9/1/2016	Assignment: Earth	"Boredom" (Note: Assignment: Earth, "Boredom" on IMDb)	Assignment: Earth, "Boredom" on YouTube	0:04:28
9/3/2016	Star Trek Continues	"Embracing the Winds" (Note: Star Trek Continues, "Embracing the Winds" on IMDb)	Star Trek Continues, "Embracing the Winds" on YouTube	0:43:56
9/11/2016	Starship Tristan	"The Greater Good" (Note: Starship Tristan, "The Greater Good" on IMDb)	Starship Tristan, "The Greater Good" on YouTube	0:06:27
9/20/2016	Project: Potemkin	"Destinies" (Note: Project: Potemkin, "Destinies" on IMDb)	Project: Potemkin, "Destinies" on YouTube	0:07:37
9/27/2016	Trek Isolation	"Out of the Fire" (Note: Trek Isolation, "Out of the Fire" on IMDb)	Trek Isolation, "Out of the Fire" on YouTube	0:06:41
10/12/2016	The Federation Files	"His Name Is Mudd" (Note: The Federation Files, "His Name Is Mudd" on IMDb)	The Federation Files, "His Name Is Mudd" on YouTube	0:47:25
10/18/2016	Starship Tristan	"Be Careful What You Wish For" (Note: Starship Tristan, "Be Careful What You Wish For" on IMDb)	Starship Tristan, "Be Careful What You Wish For" on YouTube	0:15:00
10/21/2016	Star Trek: Raven	"Voyager Continues" (Note: Star Trek: Raven, "Voyager Continues" on IMDb)	Star Trek: Raven, "Voyager Continues" on YouTube	0:32:03
10/24/2016	Project: Potemkin	"Room Service" (Note: Project: Potemkin, "Room Service" on IMDb)	Project: Potemkin, "Room Service" on YouTube	0:07:37
10/26/2016	USS Danubia	"Force Contact" (Note: USS Danubia, "Force Contact" on IMDb)	USS Danubia, "Force Contact" on YouTube	0:28:50
11/3/2016	Dreadnought Dominion	"Chain of Command" (Note: Dreadnought Dominion, "Chain of Command" on IMDb)	Dreadnought Dominion, "Chain of Command" on YouTube	0:07:38
11/10/2016	Starship Deimos	"Pas de Trois" (Note: Starship Deimos, "Pas de Trois" on IMDb)	Starship Deimos, "Pas de Trois" on YouTube	0:14:51
12/9/2016	Starship Valiant	"Crosses to Bear" (Note: Starship Valiant, "Crosses to Bear" on IMDb)	Starship Valiant, "Crosses to Bear" on YouTube	0:22:33
12/10/2016	Star Trek: Dark Armada	"Out of Time" (Note: Star Trek: Dark Armada, "Out of Time" on IMDb)	Star Trek: Dark Armada, "Out of Time" on YouTube	0:31:20

=== Winners & finalists by category ===
Best Special & Visual Effects
Series Name or Film Title	Episode Title	Special & Visual Effects Designers/Artists	Result
Star Trek: Horizon		Jeffrey Forsyth, Eric Henry, Harrison Hummel-Li, Alexander Klemm, Tommy Kraft, Dave McCarty, Ryan McClure, Ali Ries, Ryan Webber	Winner
Red Shirt		James Campbell, Sean Roberts	Finalist
Star Trek Continues	"Come Not Between the Dragons"	Marc Bell, Ali Ries, Juvenal Vique	Finalist
Star Trek: Dark Armada	"Out of Time"	Tamar Bannink, Matthijs de Boer, Jordy de Lat, Gwen Demulder, Peter Freling, Robin Hiert, Ronald Janse, Mark Rademaker, Martin van Buuren, Nicole van den Berg	Finalist
Star Trek: New Voyages	"The Holiest Thing"	Howard Brown, Pony R. Horton, Tobias Richter	Finalist

Best Sound Design, Editing & Mixing
Series Name or Film Title	Episode Title	Sound Designer(s)/Editor(s)/Mixer(s)	Result
Star Trek Continues	"Come Not Between the Dragons"	Ralph M. Miller, Michelle Siles	Winner
Star Trek Continues	"Embracing the Winds"	Ralph M. Miller	Finalist
Star Trek: Dark Armada	"Out of Time"	Matthijs de Boer, Martin van Buuren	Finalist
Star Trek: Horizon		Michael Huang, Matthew Raetzel	Finalist
Star Trek: New Voyages	"The Holiest Thing"	Jesse Akins, Coleman Clarke, Tony Falvo, Mark Edward Lewis	Finalist

Best Original Music
Series Name or Film Title	Episode Title	Musician(s)	Result
Star Trek: Horizon		Tommy Kraft	Winner
Needs of the Many		Zak Belica	Finalist
Red Shirt		Jai Sun	Finalist
Star Trek Continues	"Come Not Between the Dragons"	Andy Farber, Jonathan Kruger, David Raiklen, Michael Staffeldt	Finalist
Star Trek: Dark Armada	"Out of Time"	Justin R. Durban, Wendell Jones	Finalist

Best Makeup & Hairstyling
Series Name or Film Title	Episode Title	Makeup Artists/Hairstylists	Result
Star Trek Continues	"Come Not Between the Dragons"	Amber Burch, Shaquanta Green, Thomas Green, Stephanie Hall, Lisa Hansell, Tim Vittetoe, Aubrey Warner, Randilee Warner	Winner
Star Trek Continues	"Embracing the Winds"	Sally Barnes, Shaquanta Green, Thomas Green, Stephanie Hall, Lisa Hansell, Tim Vittetoe, Aubrey Warner, Randilee Warner	Finalist
Star Trek: Horizon		Lisa Hansell, Vera Khzouz, Tim Vittetoe	Finalist
Star Trek: New Voyages	"The Holiest Thing"	Jim Bray, Rob Burman, Brian Holloway, Dale Morton, William J. Teegarden, Rivkah Raven Wood	Finalist
Starship Farragut	"The Crossing"	Eve Gidion, Gina Hernandez, Paul Sieber	Finalist

Best Costuming
Series Name or Film Title	Episode Title	Costumer(s)	Result
Star Trek Continues	"Come Not Between the Dragons"	Hannah Barucky, Ginger Holley, Liz Wagner	Winner
Needs of the Many		Gina Vanderkley	Finalist
Star Trek Continues	"Embracing the Winds"	Ginger Holley	Finalist
Star Trek: Horizon		Tommy Kraft	Finalist
Star Trek: New Voyages	"The Holiest Thing"	James Cawley, Gwendolyn Wilkins, Patty Wright	Finalist
Starship Valiant	"Crosses to Bear"	Chrissie Harvey, Chaé Wall	Finalist
USS Danubia	"Force Contact"	Monika Konz, Petra Unglaub	Finalist

Best Guest Actor or Actress
Actor or Actress	Character	Series Name	Episode Title	Result
Gigi Edgley	Eliza Taylor	Star Trek Continues	"Come Not Between the Dragons"	Winner
Jason Carter	The Priest	Project: Potemkin	"Room Service"	Finalist
Erin Gray	Commodore Gray	Star Trek Continues	"Embracing the Winds"	Finalist
Jacy King	Doctor Carol Marcus	Star Trek: New Voyages	"The Holiest Thing"	Finalist
Clare Kramer	Commander Garrett	Star Trek Continues	"Embracing the Winds"	Finalist

Best Supporting Actor or Actress
Actor or Actress	Character	Series Name or Film Title	Episode Titles	Result
Michele Specht	Dr. Elise McKennah	Star Trek Continues	"Come Not Between the Dragons," "Embracing the Winds"	Winner
Grant Imahara	Sulu	Star Trek Continues	"Come Not Between the Dragons," "Embracing the Winds"	Finalist
Tim Kaiser	Admiral Gardner	Star Trek: Horizon		Finalist
Cat Roberts	Palmer	Star Trek Continues	"Come Not Between the Dragons," "Embracing the Winds"	Finalist
Kim Stinger	Uhura	Star Trek Continues	"Come Not Between the Dragons," "Embracing the Winds"	Finalist
Matthew Trammell	Doctor Mathias	Project: Potemkin	"The Last Child," "The Talinar Incident"	Finalist

Best Lead Actor or Actress
Actor or Actress	Character	Series Name or Film Title	Episode Titles	Result
Harriet Fettis	Elisabeth	Needs of the Many		Winner
Christopher Doohan	Mr. Scott	Star Trek Continues	"Come Not Between the Dragons," "Embracing the Winds"	Finalist
Aaron Jay	Ben	Needs of the Many		Finalist
Paul Lang	Capt. Harrison Hawke	Star Trek: Horizon		Finalist
Vic Mignogna	Captain James T. Kirk	Star Trek Continues	"Come Not Between the Dragons," "Embracing the Winds"	Finalist

Best Director
Director(s)	Series Name or Film Title	Episode Title	Result
James Kerwin	Star Trek Continues	"Embracing the Winds"	Winner
Julian Higgins	Star Trek Continues	"Come Not Between the Dragons"	Finalist
Tommy Kraft	Star Trek: Horizon		Finalist
Wayland Strickland and Scotty Whitehurst	Starship Farragut	"The Crossing"	Finalist
Aaron Vanderkley	Needs of the Many		Finalist

Best Original Story or Screenplay
Series Name	Episode Title	Author(s)/Writer(s)	Result
Star Trek: Horizon		Tommy Kraft	Winner
Needs of the Many	Aaron Vanderkley		Finalist
Star Trek Continues	"Embracing the Winds"	James Kerwin, Vic Mignogna	Finalist
Star Trek Continues	"Come Not Between the Dragons"	Greg Dykstra, James Kerwin, Vic Mignogna	Finalist
Starship Farragut	"The Crossing"	Dave Galanter, Paul Sieber	Finalist

Best Dramatic Presentation, Short Form
Series Name or Film Title	Episode Title	Executive Producer(s) (or Equivalent)	Result
Needs of the Many		Aaron Vanderkley	Winner
Project: Potemkin	"The Last Child"	Rick Foxx, Randall Landers	Finalist
Red Shirt		Kynan Dencio	Finalist
Starship Valiant	"Crosses to Bear"	Michael L. King	Finalist
Trek Isolation	"Out of the Fire"	John Broughton, Eric Moran	Finalist

Best Dramatic Presentation, Long Form
Series Name or Film Title	Episode Title	Executive Producers (or Equivalent)	Result
Star Trek: Horizon		Tommy Kraft, Leom Tait, Glen L. Wolfe	Winner
Star Trek Continues	"Come Not Between the Dragons"	Steven Dengler, Vic Mignogna	Finalist
Star Trek Continues	"Embracing the Winds"	Matt Bucy, Doug Drexler, Lisa Hansell, James Kerwin, Ralph M. Miller, Kasey Shafsky	Finalist
Star Trek: New Voyages	"The Holiest Thing"	James Cawley, Daren Dochterman, Gary Evans, Gregory L. Schnitzer	Finalist
Starship Farragut	"The Crossing"	Michael Bednar, John Broughton	Finalist

=== Summary ===
Star Trek Continues won six of twelve awards (Best Sound Design, Editing & Mixing; Best Makeup & Hairstyling; Best Costuming; Best Guest Actor or Actress; Best Supporting Actor or Actress and Best Director), Star Trek: Horizon won four awards (Best Special & Visual Effects; Best Original Music; Best Original Story or Screenplay and Best Dramatic Presentation, Long Form) and Needs of the Many won two awards (Best Lead Actor or Actress and Best Dramatic Presentation, Short Form).

== 2018 ==
Twenty-one independent Star Trek fan films released in calendar year 2017 with a total running time of eight hours, fifteen minutes were deemed eligible for consideration for the 2018 Bjo Awards.

For 2018, no changes were made to the previous year's twelve award categories.

The panel of judges for the 2018 awards included Rigel Ailur, Diana Dru Botsford, Meldrena Chapin, Keith R. A. DeCandido, Andrew Greenberg and Geoffrey Thorne. The awards ceremony was held at Treklanta on May 27, 2018, hosted by Eric L. Watts and Brian Holloway. Awards presenters included Conrad Coates, Gary Graham and Robert O'Reilly.

=== Films eligible for consideration ===
Release Date	Series Name	Episode Title	Online Video	Run Time
1/1/2017	Star Trek Nature's Hunger	"Sting of the Prosecution" (Note: Star Trek: Natures Hunger, "Sting of the Prosecution" on IMDb)	Star Trek Nature's Hunger, "Sting of the Prosecution" on YouTube	0:14:58
1/4/2017	Starship Tristan	"Between Two Worlds" (Note: Starship Tristan, "Between Two Worlds" on IMDb)	Starship Tristan, "Between Two Worlds" on YouTube	0:30:05
1/11/2017	Starship Intrepid	"Duty of Care" (Note: Starship Intrepid, "Duty of Care" on IMDb)	Starship Intrepid, "Duty of Care" on YouTube	0:08:26
1/13/2017	Starship Deimos	"The Archive" (Note: Starship Deimos, "The Archive" on IMDb)	Starship Deimos, "The Archive" on YouTube	0:11:33
2/1/2017	Chance Encounter (Note: Chance Encounter on IMDb)		Chance Encounter on YouTube	0:20:42
2/10/2017	Starship Tristan	"Departures" (Note: Starship Tristan, "Departures" on IMDb)	Starship Tristan, "Departures" on YouTube	0:07:49
2/20/2017	Quark's Space Station	"Too Much Traffic" (Note: Quark's Space Station, "Too Much Traffic" on IMDb)	Quark's Space Station, "Too Much Traffic" on YouTube	0:57:20
4/2/2017	Star Trek Continues	"Still Treads the Shadow" (Note: Star Trek Continues, "Still Treads the Shadow" on IMDb)	Star Trek Continues, "Still Treads the Shadow" on YouTube	0:54:11
4/4/2017	Starship Tristan	"The Monsters Are With Us" (Note: Starship Tristan, "The Monsters Are With Us" on IMDb)	Starship Tristan, "The Monsters Are With Us" on YouTube	0:14:17
4/29/2017	Survivors (Note: Survivors on IMDb)		Survivors on YouTube	0:15:00
5/26/2017	Starship Deimos	"No Greater Love" (Note: Starship Deimos, "No Greater Love" on IMDb)	Starship Deimos, "No Greater Love" on YouTube	0:14:09
7/30/2017	Star Trek Continues	"What Ships Are For" (Note: Star Trek Continues, "What Ships Are For" on IMDb)	Star Trek Continues, "What Ships Are For" on YouTube	0:49:13
7/31/2017	Starship Tristan	"The Voice of Your Blood" (Note: Starship Tristan, "The Voice of Your Blood" on IMDb)	Starship Tristan, "The Voice of Your Blood" on YouTube	0:14:31
8/13/2017	Starship Tristan	"Seeing Red" (Note: Starship Tristan, "Seeing Red" on IMDb)	Starship Tristan, "Seeing Red" on YouTube	0:07:56
8/18/2017	The Federation Files	"Walking Bear, Running Wolf" (Note: The Federation Files, "Walking Bear, Running Wolf" on IMDb)	The Federation Files, "Walking Bear, Running Wolf" on YouTube	0:28:20
9/8/2017	The Derelict (Note: The Derelict on IMDb)		The Derelict on YouTube	0:12:18
10/18/2017	Star Trek Continues	"To Boldly Go, Part I" (Note: Star Trek Continues, "To Boldly Go, Part I" on IMDb)	Star Trek Continues, "To Boldly Go, Part I" on YouTube	0:46:34
11/13/2017	Star Trek Continues	"To Boldly Go, Part II" (Note: Star Trek Continues, "To Boldly Go, Part II" on IMDb)	Star Trek Continues, "To Boldly Go, Part II" on YouTube	0:58:10
12/14/2017	Starship Triton	"New Orders" (Note: Starship Triton, "New Orders" on IMDb)	Starship Triton, "New Orders" on YouTube	0:05:47
12/29/2017	Star Trek: The Mirror Frontier (Note: Star Trek: The Mirror Frontier on IMDb)		Star Trek: The Mirror Frontier on YouTube	0:10:13
12/30/2017	The Federation Files	"Extraction" (Note: The Federation Files, "Extraction" on IMDb)	The Federation Files, "Extraction" on YouTube	0:13:35

=== Winners & finalists by category ===
Best Special & Visual Effects
Series Name or Film Title	Episode Title	Special & Visual Effects Designer(s)/Artist(s)	Result
Star Trek Continues	"To Boldly Go, Part II"	Stephen Bailey, Marc Bell, Matt Boardman, Daniel Dod, John Knoll, Gabriel Köerner, Tom Martinek, Michael Struck, Kenneth Thomson Jr.	Winner
Star Trek Continues	"Still Treads the Shadow"	Marc Bell, Matt Boardman	Finalist
Star Trek Continues	"To Boldly Go, Part I"	Stephen Bailey, Marc Bell, Matt Boardman, Michael Struck	Finalist
Star Trek Continues	"What Ships Are For"	Marc Bell, Matt Boardman	Finalist
Survivors		Matthew Lee Blackburn	Finalist

Best Sound Design, Editing & Mixing
Series Name or Film Title	Episode Title	Sound Designer(s)/Editor(s)/Mixer(s)	Result
Star Trek Continues	"To Boldly Go, Part II"	Stephen Cevallos, Ralph M. Miller, Dan Scanlan, Michelle Siles	Winner
Star Trek Continues	"Still Treads the Shadow"	Ralph M. Miller	Finalist
Star Trek Continues	"To Boldly Go, Part I"	Ralph M. Miller	Finalist
Star Trek Continues	"What Ships Are For"	Ralph M. Miller, Michelle Siles	Finalist
Starship Tristan	"Between Two Worlds"	Randall Landers	Finalist
Survivors		Matthew Lee Blackburn	Finalist

Best Original Music
Series Name	Episode Title	Musician(s)	Result
The Federation Files	"Walking Bear, Running Wolf"	Konora, Dan R. Reynolds	Winner
Star Trek Continues	"To Boldly Go, Part I"	Andy Farber, Vic Mignogna	Finalist
Star Trek Continues	"What Ships Are For"	Vic Mignogna	Finalist
Starship Intrepid	"Duty of Care"	Jared Cowing	Finalist
Starship Tristan	"Departures"	Anthony Johnson	Finalist

Best Makeup & Hairstyling
Series Name or Film Title	Episode Title	Makeup Artist(s)/Hairstylist(s)	Result
Star Trek Continues	"To Boldly Go, Part II"	Genie Bolet, Crystal Broedel, Amanda Denkler, Lisa Hansell, Monique Paredes, Thomas E. Surprenant, Matthew Turull, Tim Vittetoe, Aubrey Warner, Randilee Warner, Hillary Warren	Winner
Star Trek Continues	"To Boldly Go, Part I"	Genie Bolet, Crystal Broedel, Amanda Denkler, Lisa Hansell, Monique Paredes, Thomas E. Surprenant, Matthew Turull, Tim Vittetoe, Aubrey Warner, Randilee Warner, Hillary Warren	Finalist
Star Trek Continues	"What Ships Are For"	Genie Bolet, Crystal Broedel, Amanda Denkler, Stephanie Hall, Lisa Hansell, Thomas E. Surprenant, Tim Vittetoe, Randilee Warner, Hillary Warren	Finalist
Starship Intrepid	"Duty of Care"	Laura Adam, Roisin McCallum	Finalist
The Derelict		Andrew David	Finalist

Best Costuming
Series Name or Film Title	Episode Title	Costumer(s)	Result
Star Trek Continues	"To Boldly Go, Part II"	Hannah Barucky, Nora Brand, Michelle Brooks, Hiba Faouri, Ginger Holley, Miguel A. Moreta	Winner
Star Trek Continues	"Still Treads the Shadow"	Hannah Barucky, Angelica Chica, Amanda Costigan, Ginger Holley	Finalist
Star Trek Continues	"What Ships Are For"	Hannah Barucky, Hiba Faouri, Ginger Holley, Miguel A. Moreta	Finalist
Starship Intrepid	"Duty of Care"	Nicholas J. Cook	Finalist
The Derelict		Gina Vanderkley	Finalist

Best Guest Actor or Actress
Actor or Actress	Character	Series Name	Episode Title(s)	Result
Amy Rydell	Romulan Commander	Star Trek Continues	"To Boldly Go, Part I" and "To Boldly Go, Part II""	Winner
Nicola Bryant	Lana	Star Trek Continues	"To Boldly Go, Part II"	Finalist
John de Lancie	Galisti	Star Trek Continues	"What Ships Are For"	Finalist
Anne Lockhart	Thaius	Star Trek Continues	"What Ships Are For"	Finalist
Elizabeth Maxwell	Sekara	Star Trek Continues	"What Ships Are For"	Finalist

Best Supporting Actor or Actress
Actor or Actress	Character	Series Name	Episode Title(s)	Result
Michele Specht	Dr. Elise McKennah	Star Trek Continues	"What Ships Are For" and "To Boldly Go, Part I"	Winner
Kipleigh Brown	Smith	Star Trek Continues	"To Boldly Go, Part II"	Finalist
Grant Imahara	Sulu	Star Trek Continues	"To Boldly Go, Part II"	Finalist
M. Brooke Wilkins	Kira	Quark's Space Station	"Too Much Traffic"	Finalist

Best Lead Actor or Actress
Actor or Actress	Character	Series Name or Film Title	Episode Title(s)	Result
Vic Mignogna	Capt. James T. Kirk	Star Trek Continues	"What Ships Are For," "To Boldly Go, Part I" and "To Boldly Go, Part II"	Winner
Christopher Doohan	Mr. Scott	Star Trek Continues	"To Boldly Go, Part I"	Finalist
Todd Haberkorn	Mr. Spock	Star Trek Continues	"Still Treads the Shadow" and "To Boldly Go, Part II"	Finalist
Roisin McCallum	Parker	Starship Intrepid	"Duty of Care"	Finalist
Hayward Morse	Dr. Goode	Chance Encounter		Finalist

Best Director
Director	Series Name or Film Title	Episode Title	Result
Vic Mignogna	Star Trek Continues	"What Ships Are For"	Winner
Matthew Lee Blackburn	Survivors		Finalist
Nicholas J. Cook	Starship Intrepid	"Duty of Care"	Finalist
Julian Higgins	Star Trek Continues	"Still Treads the Shadow"	Finalist
James Kerwin	Star Trek Continues	"To Boldly Go, Part II"	Finalist
Aaron Vanderkley	The Derelict		Finalist

Best Original Story or Screenplay
Series Name or Film Title	Episode Title	Author(s)/Writer(s)	Result
Star Trek Continues	"What Ships Are For"	Kipleigh Brown, James Kerwin, Vic Mignogna	Winner
Chance Encounter		Paul Laight, Gary O'Brien	Finalist
Star Trek Continues	"To Boldly Go, Part I"	James Kerwin, Vic Mignogna, Robert J. Sawyer	Finalist
Star Trek Continues	"To Boldly Go, Part II"	James Kerwin, Vic Mignogna, Robert J. Sawyer	Finalist
The Derelict		Aaron Vanderkley	Finalist

Best Dramatic Presentation, Short Form
Series Name or Film Title	Episode Title	Executive Producer(s) (or Equivalent)	Result
The Derelict		Aaron Vanderkley	Winner
Chance Encounter		Paul Laight, Gary O'Brien	Finalist
Star Trek: The Mirror Frontier		Arthur Bellfield, David Eaton, Cameron Sullivan, Christian Vasquez	Finalist
Starship Deimos	"The Archive"	Randall Landers	Finalist
Starship Intrepid	"Duty of Care"	Nicholas J. Cook	Finalist
Survivors		Matthew Lee Blackburn, Daniel McIntyre	Finalist

Best Dramatic Presentation, Long Form
Series Name	Episode Title	Executive Producer(s) (or Equivalent)	Result
Star Trek Continues	"To Boldly Go, Part II"	Steven Dengler, Vic Mignogna	Winner
Quark's Space Station	"Too Much Traffic"	Bob Brandys	Finalist
Star Trek Continues	"To Boldly Go, Part I"	Steven Dengler, Vic Mignogna	Finalist
Star Trek Continues	"What Ships Are For"	Steven Dengler, Vic Mignogna	Finalist
Starship Tristan	"Between Two Worlds"	Randall Landers	Finalist

=== Summary ===
Star Trek Continues won ten of twelve awards (Best Special & Visual Effects; Best Sound Design, Editing & Mixing; Best Makeup & Hairstyling; Best Costuming; Best Guest Actor or Actress; Best Supporting Actor or Actress; Best Lead Actor or Actress; Best Director; Best Original Story or Screenplay and Best Dramatic Presentation, Long Form), The Federation Files won one award (Best Original Music) and The Derelict won one award (Best Dramatic Presentation, Short Form).

== 2019 ==
Twenty-six independent Star Trek fan films released in calendar year 2018 with a total running time of six hours, thirty-nine minutes were deemed eligible for consideration for the 2019 Bjo Awards.

For 2019, because only two of the twenty-six eligible films had running times longer than thirty minutes, the categories of Best Dramatic Presentation, Short Form (30 minutes or less) and Best Dramatic Presentation, Long Form (31 minutes or longer) were combined into a single category, Best Dramatic Presentation, decreasing the total number of categories from twelve to eleven.

The panel of judges for the 2019 awards included Rigel Ailur, Diana Dru Botsford, Andrew Greenberg, Jason P. Hunt, William Schlichter and Andrew Wallace. The awards ceremony was held at Treklanta on May 26, 2019, hosted by Eric L. Watts and Marc B. Lee. Awards presenters included Aron Eisenberg, Bill Blair and Nichole McAuley.

=== Films eligible for consideration ===
Release Date	Series Name	Episode Title	Online Video	Run Time
1/27/2018	Good Men (Note: Good Men on IMDb)		Good Men on YouTube	0:09:08
2/18/2018	Starship Intrepid	"The Story" (Note: Starship Intrepid, "The Story" on IMDb)	Starship Intrepid, "The Story" on YouTube	0:06:26
3/1/2018	Starship Tristan	"Sepulchre" (Note: Starship Tristan, "Sepulchre" on IMDb)	Starship Tristan, "Sepulchre" on YouTube	0:10:30
3/7/2018	Starship Tristan	"Pride and Prejudice" (Note: Starship Tristan, "Pride and Prejudice" on IMDb)	Starship Tristan, "Pride and Prejudice" on YouTube	0:14:45
3/16/2018	Star Trek: Natures Hunger	"Quest for a Champion" (Note: Star Trek: Natures Hunger, "Quest for a Champion" on IMDb)	Star Trek: Natures Hunger, "Quest for a Champion" on YouTube	0:14:58
5/5/2018	Starship Deimos	"Prodigal Daughter" (Note: Starship Deimos, "Prodigal Daughter" on IMDb)	Starship Deimos, "Prodigal Daughter" on YouTube	0:11:06
5/10/2018	Starship Deimos	"Shattered Sky" (Note: Starship Deimos, "Shattered Sky" on IMDb)	Starship Deimos, "Still Treads the Shadow" on YouTube	0:14:19
5/26/2018	Starship Deimos	"The Deimos Factor" (Note: Starship Deimos, "The Deimos Factor" on IMDb)	Starship Deimos, "The Deimos Factor" on YouTube	0:08:46
6/18/2018	The Fall of Starbase One (Note: The Fall of Starbase One on IMDb)		The Fall of Starbase One on YouTube	0:14:27
7/2/2018	Starship Tristan	"A Look in the Mirror" (Note: Starship Tristan, "A Look in the Mirror" on IMDb)	Starship Tristan, "A Look in the Mirror" on YouTube	0:08:46
7/27/2018	Star Trek: Eagle	"Patterns of Destruction" (Note: Star Trek: Eagle, "Patterns of Destruction" on IMDb)	Star Trek: Eagle, "Patterns of Destruction" on YouTube	1:01:25
7/31/2018	The Adventures of the USS Parkview	"The Bunny Incident" (Note: The Adventures of the USS Parkview, "The Bunny Incident" on IMDb)	The Adventures of the USS Parkview, "The Bunny Incident" on YouTube	0:06:02
8/25/2018	Starship Antyllus	"247" (Note: Starship Antyllus, "247" on IMDb)	Starship Antyllus, "247" on YouTube	0:44:18
8/25/2018	Hospital Ship Marie Curie	"The Beast" (Note: Hospital Ship Marie Curie, "The Beast" on IMDb)	Hospital Ship Marie Curie, "The Beast" on YouTube	0:12:05
9/1/2018	Starship Tristan	"Deception" (Note: Starship Tristan, "Deception" on IMDb)	Starship Tristan, "Deception" on YouTube	0:05:12
9/8/2018	Starship Triton	"The Crown Jewels of Xantharus" (Note: Starship Triton, "The Crown Jewels of Xantharus" on IMDb)	Starship Triton, "The Crown Jewels of Xantharus" on YouTube	0:12:35
9/20/2018	Starship Tristan	"Distant Echoes, Part One" (Note: Starship Tristan, "Distant Echoes, Part One" on IMDb)	Starship Tristan, "Distant Echoes, Part One" on YouTube	0:10:49
9/27/2018	Starship Tristan	"Distant Echoes, Part Two" (Note: Starship Tristan, "Distant Echoes, Part Two" on IMDb)	Starship Tristan, "Distant Echoes, Part Two" on YouTube	0:09:58
12/18/2018	Starship Endeavour	"The Monolith, Part One" (Note: Starship Endeavour, "The Monolith, Part One" on IMDb)	Starship Endeavour, "The Monolith, Part One" on YouTube	0:11:36
12/18/2018	Starship Endeavour	"The Monolith, Part Two" (Note: Starship Endeavour, "The Monolith, Part Two" on IMDb)	Starship Endeavour, "The Monolith, Part Two" on YouTube	0:07:30
12/19/2018	Starship Deimos	"Where They Have Gone, We Follow" (Note: Starship Deimos, "Where They Have Gone, We Follow" on IMDb)	Starship Deimos, "Where They Have Gone, We Follow" on YouTube	0:16:58
12/21/2018	Battlecruiser Kupok	"Spirit in the Star" (Note: Battlecruiser Kupok, "Spirit in the Star" on IMDb)	Battlecruiser Kupok, "Spirit in the Star" on YouTube	0:12:24
12/23/2018	Star Trek Enterprise E	"Assimilation" (Note: Star Trek Enterprise E, "Assimilation" on IMDb)	Star Trek Enterprise E, "Assimilation" on YouTube	0:15:57
12/28/2018	The Federation Files	"Galaxy Hopper" (Note: The Federation Files, "Galaxy Hopper" on IMDb)	The Federation Files, "Galaxy Hopper" on YouTube	0:16:11
12/30/2018	Last Survivor (Note: Last Survivor on IMDb)		Last Survivor on YouTube	0:15:00
12/31/2018	Avalon Universe	"Ghost Ship" (Note: Avalon Universe, "Ghost Ship" on IMDb)	Avalon Universe, "Ghost Ship" on YouTube	0:27:11

=== Winners & finalists by category ===
Best Special & Visual Effects
Series Name or Film Title	Episode Title	Special & Visual Effects Designer(s)/Artist(s)	Result
Avalon Universe	"Ghost Ship"	Samuel Cockings, Earl Hale	Winner
Last Survivor		Matthew Lee Blackburn	Finalist
The Adventures of the USS Parkview	"The Bunny Incident"	Robert McConnell	Finalist
The Federation Files	"Galaxy Hopper"	Samuel Cockings, Josiah Reynolds, Dan R. Reynolds	Finalist

Best Sound Design, Editing & Mixing
Series Name or Film Title	Episode Title	Sound Designer(s)/Editor(s)/Mixer(s)	Result
Last Survivor		Matthew Lee Blackburn	Winner
Starship Antyllus	"247"	Jack Finlay, Doug Grindstaff, George Kayaian, Joseph G. Sorokin	Finalist
Starship Deimos	"Shattered Sky," "The Deimos Factor," "Where They Have Gone, We Follow," "The Monolith, Part One," "The Monolith, Part Two"	Randall Landers	Finalist
The Federation Files	"Galaxy Hopper"	Lonnie P. Howard, Dan R. Reynolds	Finalist

Best Original Music
Series Name	Episode Title	Musician(s)	Result
The Adventures of the USS Parkview	"The Bunny Incident"	Kevin Croxton	Winner
Avalon Universe	"Ghost Ship"	Nicholas McFarland	Finalist
Battlecruiser Kupok	"Spirit in the Star"	Anthony Johnson, Tony Lunn	Finalist
Last Survivor		Roland Mair-Gruber	Finalist

Best Makeup & Hairstyling
Series Name or Film Title	Episode Title	Makeup Artist(s)/Hairstylist(s)	Result
Avalon Universe	"Ghost Ship"	Lezlie Sawyer	Winner
Last Survivor		Matthew Lee Blackburn	Finalist
Starship Triton	"The Crown Jewels of Xantharus"	Ann Elliott Drew, Renda Carr, Lezlie Cohen, Tilcia Furman, Randall Landers, Heather Spates	Finalist
The Adventures of the USS Parkview	"The Bunny Incident"	Audrea Martin, Lindsay Jerden	Finalist

Best Costuming
Series Name or Film Title	Episode Title	Costumer(s)	Result
Good Men and The Fall of Starbase One		Gina Vanderkley	Winner
Starship Triton	"The Crown Jewels of Xantharus"	Lezlie Cohen, Ann Elliott Drew, Tilcia Furman, Sara Jean	Finalist
The Adventures of the USS Parkview	"The Bunny Incident"	Dottie Smith	Finalist
The Federation Files	"Galaxy Hopper"	Emma Patricia Roberts	Finalist

Best Guest Actor or Actress
Actor or Actress	Character	Series Name	Episode Title(s)	Result
Shelton E. Walker	Commodore Alwine	Starship Endeavour	"The Monolith, Part One" and "The Monolith, Part Two"	Winner
Lezlie Cohen	Commander Mona	Starship Triton	"The Crown Jewels of Xantharus"	Finalist
James Dougherty	Jim Graham	Starship Antyllus	"247"	Finalist
Tilcia Furman	Commander Mona	Hospital Ship Marie Curie	"The Beast"	Finalist
Tom Hagale	Governor Cruz	Starship Endeavour	"The Monolith, Part One" and "The Monolith, Part Two"	Finalist
Sarah Tompkins	Karas	Starship Deimos	"Prodigal Daughter"	Finalist

Best Supporting Actor or Actress
Actor or Actress	Character	Series Name	Episode Title(s)	Result
Lezlie Sawyer	Communications Officer	Avalon Universe	"Ghost Ship"	Winner
Jose E. Cepeda	Engineer Ramses	The Federation Files	"Galaxy Hopper"	Finalist
Jack Ryan	MACO Soldier	The Fall of Starbase One		Finalist
Cheryl Sahawneh	Romulan Commander	Starship Triton	"The Crown Jewels of Xantharus"	Finalist
Abby Shepherd	Yeoman	The Adventures of the USS Parkview	"The Bunny Incident"	Finalist
Sarah Tompkins	Navigator Anaya	Starship Deimos	"Shattered Sky," "Where They Have Gone, We Follow"	Finalist

Best Lead Actor or Actress
Actor or Actress	Character	Series Name or Film Title	Episode Title(s)	Result
Daniel Buckle	Ambassador Sultek	The Fall of Starbase One		Winner
Rachel Kahan	Mackenzie	The Fall of Starbase One		Finalist
Victoria Fox	Lt. Amanda Beck	Avalon Universe	"Ghost Ship"	Finalist
Ben Peer	Captain	The Adventures of the USS Parkview	"The Bunny Incident"	Finalist

Best Director
Director	Series Name or Film Title	Episode Title	Result
Aaron Vanderkley	The Fall of Starbase One		Winner
Kevin Croxton	The Adventures of the USS Parkview	"The Bunny Incident"	Finalist
Joshua Michael Irwin	Avalon Universe	"Ghost Ship"	Finalist
Aaron Vanderkley	Good Men		Finalist

Best Original Story or Screenplay
Author(s)/Writer(s)	Series Name or Film Title	Episode Title	Result
Kevin Croxton	The Adventures of the USS Parkview	"The Bunny Incident"	Winner
Joshua Michael Irwin	Avalon Universe	"Ghost Ship"	Finalist
Alex McVey, Aaron Vanderkley	Good Men		Finalist
Aaron Vanderkley	The Fall of Starbase One		Finalist
Glen L. Wolfe	The Federation Files	"Galaxy Hopper"	Finalist

Best Dramatic Presentation
Series Name or Film Title	Episode Title	Executive Producer(s) (or Equivalent)	Result
Avalon Universe	"Ghost Ship"	Joshua Michael Irwin	Winner
Last Survivor		Katie Blackburn, Matthew Lee Blackburn, Daniel McIntyre	Finalist
The Adventures of the USS Parkview	"The Bunny Incident"	Kevin Croxton	Finalist
The Fall of Starbase One		Aaron Vanderkley	Finalist

=== Summary ===
Avalon Universe, "Ghost Ship" won four of eleven awards (Best Special & Visual Effects, Best Makeup & Hairstyling, Best Supporting Actor or Actress, Best Dramatic Presentation); The Adventures of the USS Parkview, "The Bunny Incident" won two awards (Best Original Music, Best Original Story or Screenplay); The Fall of Starbase One won two awards (Best Lead Actor or Actress, Best Director) and shared one with Good Men (Best Costuming); Last Survivor won one award (Best Sound Design, Editing & Mixing); and Starship Endeavour, "The Monolith, Part One" and "The Monolith, Part Two" won one award (Best Guest Actor or Actress).

== 2020 ==
Thirty-three independent Star Trek fan films released in calendar year 2019 with a total running time of ten hours, nine minutes were deemed eligible for consideration for the 2020 Bjo Awards. Eleven of these films were one-half of a two-part film. Because the casts and crews of these eleven films are identical in both parts, the ballot listed them as single two-part films in order to not pad the ballot with double entries for essentially the same film. (One film, the 16-minute first half of a two-parter, was withdrawn from the ballot because the second part was not released until 2020, reducing the total run time of the remaining films to nine hours, fifty-four minutes. This excluded film will be included on the 2021 ballot.) As a result, the remaining ten films, each one half of an episode, became five two-parters, with two of them exceeding 30 minutes in running time. There were also five single-part films that exceeded 30 minutes, bringing the total number of films, as listed on the ballot, that exceeded 30 minutes to seven. Accordingly, the category of Best Dramatic Presentation was once again divided into two categories: Best Dramatic Presentation, Short Form (30 minutes or less) and Best Dramatic Presentation, Long Form (31 minutes or longer), bringing the total number of award categories back up to twelve. The remaining ten unchanged categories were Best Original Story or Screenplay; Best Director; Best Lead Actor or Actress; Best Supporting Actor or Actress; Best Guest Actor or Actress; Best Costuming; Best Makeup & Hairstyling; Best Original Music; Best Sound Design, Editing & Mixing; and Best Special & Visual Effects.

The panel of judges for the 2020 awards included Rigel Ailur, Troy Bernier, Michael A. Burstein, Melissa Carter, Matthew M. Foster, Andrew Greenberg, Robert Greenberger, Mark McCray, Jeremy Roberts, William Schlichter and Andrew Wallace. The awards ceremony was held at Neutral Zone Studios in Kingsland, Georgia, on December 11, 2021, hosted by Eric L. Watts and Pixi "Ilia" Nereid. The awards presenter was Pixi "Ilia" Nereid.

=== Films eligible for consideration ===
Release Date	Series or Film Name	Episode Title	Online Video	Run Time
1/31/2019	Temporal Anomaly	"Part 1" (Note: Temporal Anomaly, "Part 1" on IMDb)	Temporal Anomaly, "Part 1" on YouTube	0:26:46
1/31/2019	Temporal Anomaly	"Part 2" (Note: Temporal Anomaly, "Part 2" on IMDb)	Temporal Anomaly, "Part 2" on YouTube	0:24:19
2/2/2019	Avalon Universe	"Avalon Lost" (Note: Avalon Universe, "Avalon Lost" on IMDb)	Avalon Universe, "Avalon Lost" on YouTube	0:16:02
2/16/2019	Starship Deimos	"Diplomatic Relations" (Note: Starship Deimos, "Diplomatic Relations" on IMDb)	Starship Deimos, "Diplomatic Relations" on YouTube	0:08:45
4/30/2019	Starship Antyllus	"Desperate Gambit" (Note: Starship Antyllus, "Desperate Gambit" on IMDb)	Starship Antyllus, "Desperate Gambit" on YouTube	0:30:39
5/12/2019	The Holy Core (Note: The Holy Core on IMDb)		The Holy Core on YouTube	0:30:47
5/25/2019	Starship Deimos	"Children of Eberus" (Note: Starship Deimos, "Children of Eberus" on IMDb)	Starship Deimos, "Children of Eberus" on YouTube	0:10:54
5/25/2019	Starship Triton	"Confrontations" (Note: Starship Triton, "Confrontations" on IMDb)	Starship Triton, "Confrontations" on YouTube	0:15:05
6/11/2019	Tales from The Neutral Zone	"The Looking Glass, Part 1" (Note: Tales from The Neutral Zone, "The Looking Glass, Part 1" on IMDb)	Tales from The Neutral Zone, "The Looking Glass, Part 1" on YouTube	0:11:27
6/12/2019	Tales from The Neutral Zone	"The Looking Glass, Part 2" (Note: Tales from The Neutral Zone, "The Looking Glass, Part 2" on IMDb)	Tales from The Neutral Zone, "The Looking Glass, Part 2" on YouTube	0:11:21
6/15/2019	Dreadnought Dominion	"Redemption at Red Medusa" (Note: Dreadnought Dominion, "Redemption at Red Medusa" on IMDb)	Dreadnought Dominion, "Redemption at Red Medusa" on YouTube	0:23:30
6/21/2019	To Have Boldly Gone	"Part 1" (Note: To Have Boldly Gone, "Part 1" on IMDb)	To Have Boldly Gone, "Part 1" on YouTube	0:15:31
6/21/2019	To Have Boldly Gone	"Part 2" (Note: To Have Boldly Gone, "Part 2" on IMDb)	To Have Boldly Gone, "Part 2" on YouTube	0:14:10
6/22/2019	Starship Tristan	"Repercussions, Part One" (Note: Starship Tristan, "Repercussions, Part One" on IMDb)	Starship Tristan, "Repercussions, Part One" on YouTube	0:15:02
7/21/2019	Star Trek: Unity	"The Lewis Inquiry" (Note: Star Trek: Unity, "The Lewis Inquiry" on IMDb)	Star Trek: Unity, "The Lewis Inquiry" on YouTube	0:44:40
7/27/2019	Line of Duty (Note: Line of Duty on IMDb)		Line of Duty on YouTube	0:20:01
7/27/2019	Starship Tristan	"Repercussions, Part Two" (Note: Starship Tristan, "Repercussions, Part Two" on IMDb)	Starship Tristan, "Repercussions, Part Two" on YouTube	0:14:43
9/14/2019	Star Trek: Unity	"Tabula Rasa" (Note: Star Trek: Unity, "Tabula Rasa" on IMDb)	Star Trek: Unity, "Tabula Rasa" on YouTube	0:02:51
10/9/2019	The Human Adventure (Note: The Human Adventure on IMDb)		The Human Adventure on YouTube	0:13:31
10/21/2019	Starship Deimos	"The Solomon Gamble" (Note: Starship Deimos, "The Solomon Gamble" on IMDb)	Starship Deimos, "The Solomon Gamble" on YouTube	0:11:27
10/29/2019	The Federation Files	"Galaxy Hopper" (Note: The Federation Files, "Galaxy Hopper" on IMDb)	The Federation Files, "Galaxy Hopper" on YouTube	0:14:48
10/30/2019	Avalon Universe	"Demons, Part 1" (Note: Avalon Universe, "Demons, Part 1" on IMDb)	Avalon Universe, "Demons, Part 1" on YouTube	0:19:12
10/31/2019	Dreadnought Dominion	"The Heist" (Note: Dreadnought Dominion, "The Heist" on IMDb)	Dreadnought Dominion, "The Heist" on YouTube	0:17:02
11/7/2019	Avalon Universe	"Demons, Part 2" (Note: Avalon Universe, "Demons, Part 2" on IMDb)	Avalon Universe, "Demons, Part 2" on YouTube	0:16:36
11/17/2019	Battlecruiser Kupok	"A Matter of Trust" (Note: Battlecruiser Kupok, "A Matter of Trust" on IMDb)	Battlecruiser Kupok, "A Matter of Trust" on YouTube	0:09:53
12/7/2019	Shakedown (Note: Shakedown on IMDb)		Shakedown on YouTube	0:13:51
12/7/2019	Break Free (Note: Break Free on IMDb)		Break Free on YouTube	0:32:01
12/7/2019	Eleventh Hour (Note: Eleventh Hour on IMDb)		Eleventh Hour on YouTube	0:11:25
12/7/2019	All Roads Lead to Home (Note: All Roads Lead to Home on IMDb)		All Roads Lead to Home on YouTube	0:17:09
12/7/2019	The Scribbler (Note: The Scribbler on IMDb)		The Scribbler on YouTube	0:16:20
12/18/2019	Starship Antyllus	"As It Is Written..." (Note: Starship Antyllus, "As It Is Written..." on IMDb)	Starship Antyllus, "As It Is Written..." on YouTube	0:39:09
12/31/2019	The Federation Files	"The Equinox Effect" (Note: The Federation Files, "The Equinox Effect" on IMDb)	The Federation Files, "The Equinox Effect" on YouTube	0:25:22

=== Winners & finalists by category ===
Best Special & Visual Effects
Series Name or Film Title	Episode Title	Special & Visual Effects Designer(s)/Artist(s)	Result
Line of Duty		Samuel Cockings	Winner
Avalon Universe	"Avalon Lost"	Samuel Cockings, Joshua Michael Irwin	Finalist
Avalon Universe	"Demons" Part 1 and Part 2	Samuel Cockings, Joshua Michael Irwin	Finalist
The Holy Core		David Combe, Jim Riker, Gary O'Brien	Finalist
Temporal Anomaly	"Part 1" and "Part 2"	Samuel Cockings	Finalist

Best Sound Design, Editing & Mixing
Series Name or Film Title	Episode Title	Sound Designer(s)/Editor(s)/Mixer(s)	Result
Avalon Universe	"Demons" Part 1 and Part 2	Joshua Michael Irwin	Winner
Avalon Universe	"Avalon Lost"	Joshua Michael Irwin	Finalist
The Holy Core		Gary O'Brien	Finalist
Tales from The Neutral Zone	"The Looking Glass" Part 1 and Part 2	Cliff Stoner, Dan Scanlan, Michael Heath Jr.	Finalist
To Have Boldly Gone	"Part 1" and "Part 2"	Dan Scanlan	Finalist

Best Original Music
Series Name	Episode Title	Musician(s)	Result
Avalon Universe	"Demons" Part 1 and Part 2	Nicholas McFarland	Winner
All Roads Lead to Home		Adam Mullen	Finalist
Avalon Universe	"Avalon Lost"	Nicholas McFarland	Finalist
The Federation Files	"The Equinox Effect"	Kevin McLeod	Finalist
Temporal Anomaly	"Part 1" and "Part 2"	Matt Milne	Finalist

Best Makeup & Hairstyling
Series Name or Film Title	Episode Title	Makeup Artist(s)/Hairstylist(s)	Result
Line of Duty		Sankari Sivaramalingam	Winner
Avalon Universe	"Avalon Lost"	Victoria Fox	Finalist
Avalon Universe	"Demons" Part 1 and Part 2	Emmanuel J. Rodriguez, Leah French, Victoria Fox, Heather Meré	Finalist
Battlecruiser Kupok	"A Matter of Trust"	Randall Landers, Ann Elliott Drew	Finalist
The Federation Files	"The Equinox Effect"	Leah French, Stephania Masco, Michelle Reynolds, K.T. Blessing	Finalist
Starship Tristan	"Repercussions" Part One and Part Two	Renda Carr, Ann Elliott Drew, Randall Landers	Finalist

Best Costuming
Series Name or Film Title	Episode Title	Costumer(s)	Result
Line of Duty		Gina Vanderkley	Winner
Avalon Universe	"Avalon Lost"	Joshua Michael Irwin, Victoria Fox	Finalist
Avalon Universe	"Demons" Part 1 and Part 2	Victoria Fox, Glen L. Wolfe	Finalist
The Federation Files	"The Equinox Effect"	Glen L. Wolfe, Emma Patricia Roberts	Finalist
Tales from The Neutral Zone	"The Looking Glass" Part 1 and Part 2	Stephanie Mann	Finalist

Best Guest Actor or Actress
Actor or Actress	Character	Series Name	Episode Title(s)	Result
John Laws	James Laws	Avalon Universe	"Demons" Part 1 and Part 2	Winner
David Butler Agrinsonis	Excalibur Helmsman	Avalon Universe	"Demons" Part 1 and Part 2	Finalist
Lillian Cole	Captain Gaia Starr	Battlecruiser Kupok	"A Matter of Trust"	Finalist
Tracie Frank	Lt. Commander Pyper	Dreadnought Dominion	"Redemption at Red Medusa"	Finalist
Glen L. Wolfe	Captain Harris	Avalon Universe	"Demons" Part 1 and Part 2	Finalist

Best Supporting Actor or Actress
Actor or Actress	Character	Series Name	Episode Title(s)	Result
Paul Walencamp	Captain	Line of Duty		Winner
Victoria Archer	Engineer Jamie Archer	Avalon Universe	"Avalon Lost"	Finalist
Victoria Fox	Bartley/T'Xi	Break Free		Finalist
Victoria Fox	Lt. Mary Bartley	Shakedown		Finalist
Emma Long	Commander Eleanor	Star Trek: Unity	"The Lewis Inquiry"	Finalist
Jessica Niven	Fletcher	Line of Duty		Finalist
Sankari Sivaramalingam	Doctor	Line of Duty		Finalist
Gill Sutton	President Jillian/Laura Lee	Star Trek: Unity	"The Lewis Inquiry"	Finalist

Best Lead Actor or Actress
Actor or Actress	Character	Series Name or Film Title	Episode Title(s)	Result
Juliet Godwin	Hero	Line of Duty		Winner
Hannaj Bang Bendz	Commander Boltzmann	The Holy Core		Finalist
Mary Jane Blystone	Janessa Mitchell	All Roads Lead to Home		Finalist
Marcus Churchill	Ensign Sam Harriman	Temporal Anomaly	"Part 1" and "Part 2"	Finalist
Victoria Fox	Commander Beck	Avalon Universe	"Demons" Part 1 and Part 2	Finalist
Will Leach	Charlie	Line of Duty		Finalist

Best Original Story or Screenplay
Author(s)/Writer(s)	Series Name or Film Title	Episode Title	Result
Paul Laight, Gary O'Brien	The Holy Core		Winner
Joshua Michael Irwin, Victoria Fox	Avalon Universe	"Avalon Lost"	Finalist
Aaron Vanderkley	Line of Duty		Finalist
Randall Landers	Starship Deimos	"Children of Eberus"	Finalist
Samuel Cockings	Temporal Anomaly	"Part 1" and "Part 2"	Finalist

Best Director
Director	Series Name or Film Title	Episode Title	Result
Aaron Vanderkley	Line of Duty		Winner
Joshua Michael Irwin, Victoria Fox	Avalon Universe	"Avalon Lost"	Finalist
Victoria Fox	Avalon Universe	"Demons" Part 1 and Part 2	Finalist
Gary O'Brien	The Holy Core		Finalist
Samuel Cockings	Temporal Anomaly	"Part 1" and "Part 2"	Finalist
Lawrence Fleming	To Have Boldly Gone	"Part 1" and "Part 2"	Finalist

Best Dramatic Presentation, Short Form
Series Name or Film Title	Episode Title	Executive Producer(s) (or Equivalent)	Result
Line of Duty		Aaron Vanderkley	Winner
Avalon Universe	"Avalon Lost"	Joshua Michael Irwin, Victoria Fox	Finalist
Eleventh Hour		Vance Major	Finalist
Starship Deimos	"Children of Eberus"	Randall Landers	Finalist

Best Dramatic Presentation, Long Form
Series Name or Film Title	Episode Title	Executive Producer(s) (or Equivalent)	Result
The Holy Core		Alexander Mayer	Winner
Avalon Universe	"Demons" Part 1 and Part 2	Joshua Michael Irwin, Victoria Fox	Finalist
Temporal Anomaly	"Part 1" and "Part 2"	Samuel Cockings, Alex Nikitin, Glen L. Wolfe	Finalist

=== Summary ===
Line of Duty won seven of twelve awards (Best Special & Visual Effects; Best Makeup & Hairstyling; Best Costuming; Best Supporting Actor or Actress; Best Lead Actor or Actress; Best Director; Best Dramatic Presentation, Short Form); Avalon Universe, "Demons" Part 1 and Part 2 won three awards (Best Sound Design, Editing & Mixing; Best Original Music; Best Guest Actor or Actress); and The Holy Core won two awards (Best Original Story or Screenplay; Best Dramatic Presentation, Long Form).
