= The White Iris =

- Star Trek Continues episode
- Episode no.: Episode 4
- Directed by: James Kerwin
- Story by: Vic Mignogna; Chris White
- Teleplay by: James Kerwin; Chris White; Vic Mignogna
- Cinematography by: Matt Bucy
- Original air date: May 29, 2015
- Running time: 47:54

Guest appearances
- Colin Baker as Amphidamas; Nakia Burrise as Nakia; Tiffany Brouwer as Miramanee; Adrienne Wilkinson as Edith Keeler; Sarai Duenas as Miramanee's Child; Marina Sirtis as Computer voice; Kipleigh Brown as Smith; Gabriela Fresquez as Rayna

Episode chronology
| ← Previous "Fairest of Them All" | Next → "Divided We Stand" |

"The White Iris" is a fan-produced Star Trek episode released in 2015, the fourth in the web series Star Trek Continues, which aims to continue the episodes of Star Trek: The Original Series replicating their visual and storytelling style. The episode is dedicated to Leonard Nimoy, who had died earlier in the year.

== Plot summary ==
Captain Kirk, Scotty, and Uhura are on the planet Chalcis to welcome its people to the Federation. To protect the Chalcidians from missile attacks by their warlike sister world of Eretria, the Federation has promised the Chalcidians a planetary defense grid. Kirk is struck in the back of the head by an Eretrian dissident, forcing an emergency beam out. In sickbay, Kirk has an hallucination of Rayna, an android girl who died after being overwhelmed by the emotions she developed by falling in love with Kirk. Spock had erased Rayna from Kirk's memory to save him from the emotional turmoil.

McCoy uses the experimental drug alkysine to save Kirk's life. Kirk appears to make a recovery, and proceeds to the bridge in order to activate the defense grid with his own personal password. However, Kirk is suddenly stopped by the image of a woman in an old Starfleet uniform. She vanishes and Kirk cannot remember the password. As Chekov and Scott try to initialize the grid, Kirk sees a little girl running in the halls.

On the bridge, Smith reports a missile from Eretria heading directly for Chalcis. The Chalcidian minister demands the password to activate the grid, but Spock is forced to stall for time while the captain recovers. In sickbay, Kirk once again sees the beautiful woman lying on a bio-bed. McCoy reports that his heart appears to be shutting down with no medical explanation. Kirk tells him about the woman he's been seeing in his hallucinations: Nakia, an officer he dated on the Farragut. She was killed along with 200 crewman at Tycho IV by the dikronium cloud creature.

McCoy believes Kirk's symptoms may be psychological, and that the injury or the alkysine may have unleashed emotions that Kirk's been keeping buried. McCoy suggests Dr. McKennah's help, but Kirk refuses and vows to return to the bridge. While arguing with Spock in the hallway, Kirk sees another old love: Edith Keeler, a woman he met on Earth in the 1930s, whom he allowed to die in order to restore history. Kirk suffers a brief but painful seizure.

Back on the bridge, Uhura reports that a replacement grid is four days away. Smith reports the Eretrian missile has vanished from sensors.

Spock, McKennah, and McCoy speculate as to the cause of the captain's condition, but once again Kirk is dismissive of McKennah's help. While Spock and McCoy try to plead with Kirk, he once again has another hallucination: this time of Miramanee, the American Indian princess whom he married during a memory lapse. Miramanee had become pregnant with Kirk's child, but subsequently died when Kirk was attacked by angry villagers. Kirk then experiences another seizure, but resolves to perform his duties.

On the bridge, Spock, Sulu, and Smith are able to detect and destroy the Eretrian warhead. But at a crucial moment, Kirk is tormented by the hallucinations of Nakia, Edith, and Miramanee. Disturbed, Kirk relieves himself of duty and hands control of the ship to Mr. Spock.

With McCoy in his quarters, Kirk wonders aloud about the women. Despite his love, he feels that they died because of him, since he had to "do his duty" in each case. Kirk has another seizure and sees all three women again; however, Spock mind-melds with him and witnesses the women as well. Spock is uncertain as to whether the women are figments of Kirk's imagination or actual katras (souls), and he suggests to Kirk that they may need closure in order to move on.

Kirk finally goes to see Dr. McKennah, who notes that he feels a tremendous amount of guilt. The feelings of grief that Kirk has kept buried for so long are coming out now, and it's not actually the women who need closure. It's Kirk himself.

Kirk goes to Scotty's experimental holographic rec room, and recreates the scenes in which he encountered each woman. In the 1930s he sees Edith, the woman he loved for her compassion and her intellect; the one who could see that humanity would find peace and explore the galaxy. Kirk informs her that she had to die in order for history to be restored properly, so that her dreams of a better future would eventually come into fruition. Understanding, she tells Kirk to be at peace. In sickbay on the Farragut, Kirk sees Nakia, the woman he loved in his youth. She tells him she knew the risks when she entered Starfleet, and that he needs to forgive himself. In the American Indian village, Miramanee is on her deathbed. Kirk tells her he sometimes wishes that he had not been found, as he was never happier than when he was with her. She was a gift he could never repay. Miramanee tells him that he made her very happy; that her place was by his side; that one does not repay a gift. Finally Kirk sees the android girl Rayna, whom he loved because she, too, was lonely. Rayna simply smiles and says nothing; she is at peace as well.

Smith reports that Eretria has launched a barrage of missiles, and Kirk orders the Enterprise to physically block them in order to protect Chalcis. He begins to head to the bridge when he encounters the little girl again. He asks her name, and she says he never gave her one. She then shows him a gift – a piece of beadwork with markings from Miramanee's headband – at which point Kirk realizes she is a vision of his unborn child. Kirk imagines hugging her, and she whispers the word "Irises." Remembering now that this is the password, Kirk is able to activate the defense grid.

After witnessing the grid's power, the Eretrians declare their intention to sue for peace. Kirk thanks McKennah for her help and notes that he now sees the benefit of having a counselor on board. Meanwhile, Spock and McCoy are perplexed as to why Kirk chose the password "Irises." Spock discovers a painting called Irises by Vincent van Gogh – a single white iris in a field of purple flowers, which van Gogh apparently used to symbolize his loneliness.

McCoy notes that, despite most of his heart shutting down, Kirk still persevered because part of his heart belongs to another special lady. Kirk smiles as he realizes McCoy's referring to the Enterprise herself.

== Production ==
Two Kickstarter campaigns raised a total of $250,000 to make five episodes of the series. For comparison a single episode in 1966 cost approximately $190,000 (equivalent to about $1,900,000 in 2025).

== Controversy ==
On June 1, 2015, the episode was removed from YouTube due to "copyright claims by CBS". However, the episode remained on Vimeo. Two days later, Mignogna announced on the production's official Facebook page that the removal of the episode was unintentional, per a vice president in the CBS legal department, and that "YouTube has been instructed to reinstate it immediately."

== Reception ==
Robert Lyons of TrekMovie.com gave it a positive review, he praised the story but found the tone a little bit off. He concluded "These episodes join a rich heritage of thoughtful and conscientious science fiction that has borne the Star Trek mantle for 50 years."
