= BJO =

Bjo or BJO may refer to:

- Bundesjugendorchester, the national youth orchestra of Germany
- Bjo Awards
- Bjo Trimble, American science fiction fan and writer
- British Journal of Ophthalmology
- British Junior Open Squash
