= Divided We Stand (Star Trek Continues) =

- Star Trek Continues episode
- Episode no.: Episode 5
- Directed by: Vic Mignogna
- Story by: Vic Mignogna
- Teleplay by: Marc Cushman; Susan Osborn
- Cinematography by: Matt Bucy
- Original air date: September 26, 2015
- Running time: 42:45

Guest appearances
- Martin Bradford as Dr. M'Benga; Scotty Whitehurst as Billy; Kipleigh Brown as Smith; Greg Dykstra as Dr. Heath; Blaque Fowler as Pappy

Episode chronology
← Previous "The White Iris"	Next → "Come Not Between The Dragons"

"Divided We Stand" is a fan-produced Star Trek episode released in 2015, the fifth in the web series Star Trek Continues, which aims to continue the episodes of Star Trek: The Original Series replicating their visual and storytelling style The episode is dedicated to Grace Lee Whitney, who had died earlier in the year.

== Plot synopsis ==
During an attempt to free the ship's computer from a nano-virus, an explosion puts Kirk and McCoy in a coma that leaves them awake in a turbulent moment in time - the American Civil War, with Kirk in a Union uniform and McCoy in a Confederate uniform - the Battle of Antietam.
