= Starship Exeter =

- Starship Exeter official logo
- Created by: Jimm & Josh Johnson
- Starring: James Culhane; Holly Guess; Michael Buford; Joshua Caleb
- Country of origin: United States
- No. of episodes: 2

Production
- Executive producer: Jimm Johnson

Original release
- Network: World Wide Web
- Release: December 19, 2002

Starship Exeter is a Star Trek fan film project, one of the earliest of the semi-professional fan film projects that have become an increasingly common fixture of the internet video scene. As with many other fan films, it created new stories and characters around an event of an established franchise. Starship Exeter is set within the continuity of the original Star Trek TV series, and features the new crew of a sister-ship to the famous USS Enterprise, the titular USS Exeter, whose previous crew were exterminated in the Star Trek episode "The Omega Glory". The films and their original characters are the brainchild of brothers Jimm and Joshua Johnson, who acted as producers and starred in the films, acting under pseudonyms.

== Episodes ==
Two episodes of Starship Exeter have been released.

"The Savage Empire," written and co-directed by the Johnson brothers, was released as downloadable video files via the internet on December 19, 2002. Production and post-production took several years, with shooting in Minnesota and Texas (and an insert scene recorded in Sydney), mixed between exterior locations and custom-built sets. The producers strove to make the film using non-digital effects techniques, using miniatures and in-camera effects wherever practical.

The second, a far more ambitious production titled "The Tressaurian Intersection", with a script by Nebula Award nominee Dennis Russell Bailey (who co-wrote the Star Trek: The Next Generation episode "Tin Man"), was shot in mid-2004. Played primarily aboard the titular starship and a wrecked sister ship, the film featured elaborate sets, some elements of which were "dumpster dived" from the Mike Judge film Idiocracy that was shooting on the same Austin Studios lot. In addition to CGI effects, the film also used elaborate miniatures to realize the interiors of both a shuttle and ruined starship courtesy of Minneapolis-based MNFX, and to portray wreckage both on a planet and in space as built by Thomas Sasser (not all of whose work made the final episode).

Released in segments, "The Tressaurian Intersection" film suffered a protracted post–production process, with the final complete episode being released via YouTube on May 1, 2014, just months shy of 10 years from the start of principal photography.

A third episode, "The Atlantis Invaders," was to have shipboard scenes shot during principal photography of the "Tressaurian" episode, but budget and scheduling problems caused it be postponed, and ultimately abandoned.

In addition to the two full-length episodes, a humorous vignette titled The Night Shift, written by Dennis Russell Bailey, was shot as a trial run and as camera tests at the start of principal photography of "The Tressaurian Intersection". It was released on the internet in August 2005.

== Legacy ==
Albeit not the first, Exeter's "The Savage Empire" is arguably the vanguard of the modern internet-distributed Trek fanfilm in terms of scope, production value, and large audience reached primarily through social media. A January 2, 2003 mention on SlashDot resulted in a deluge of traffic to the Exeter website and exceeded 10,000 hits per hour. The bandwidth demands proved more than Mac.Com could handle, forcing the film to be hosted on a private server. Immediately thereafter the Sci-Fi Channel website listed the Exeter website as their Site of the Week for January 21, 2003, stating, "The end result is an episode that's actually better than some of the 'official' Trek that's been produced, and it just goes to show what fans can do with today's technology and a heck of a lot of determination.". Exeter also topped the Hot Sites on USA Today's online Web Guide on February 2, 2003. (The today better-known Star Trek: New Voyages' first film would not bow for another year.)

The Exeter starship bridge set built for "The Tressaurian Intersection" was loaned to a fanfilm project in Oklahoma City, Oklahoma, restored and expanded, and eventually located in the vicinity of Harrison, Arkansas. The set was eventually scrapped with the closure of that studio.

The creators of several other Star Trek fanfilm productions—including Starship Farragut and Star Trek Intrepid—have cited Exeter as an inspiration for their efforts.

== Cast ==
=== Main characters ===
Character	Rank	Actor	Position
John Quincy Garrovick	Captain	James Culhane	Garrovick is the cousin of the Ensign Garrovick who joined Captain Kirk in an attempt to destroy a mist-creature in the original Star Trek episode "Obsession". Garrovick took command of the USS Exeter at the age of 37, following the demise of several veteran Starfleet captains.
Jo Harris	Commander	Holly Guess	Harris is the executive (first) officer as well as the science officer of the ship, following the pattern of Spock from the original series. Harris is a human from the United Kingdom on Earth.
Paul Cutty	Commander	Michael Buford	The ship's Chief Security Officer, he served with then-Commander Garrovick on board the USS Kongō where the two became close friends. The Kongō was commanded by an officer they both looked up to, Captain Kosnett (Garry Peters), who makes a cameo appearance in the second episode.
B'fuselek	Lieutenant	Joshua Caleb	The Exeter's communications officer, a blue-skinned, antennaed Andorian. The makeup is patterned on designs seen in the original series episodes "Journey to Babel" and "Whom Gods Destroy".
Vandi Richards	Ensign	Elizabeth Wheat	Richards is the Captain's assistant, essentially filling the "yeoman" role.

- "James Culhane" and "Joshua Caleb" are pseudonyms for the Johnson brothers.
