= Prelude to Axanar =

2014 fan-made film set in the Star Trek universe

- Film poster
- Directed by: Christian Gossett
- Screenplay by: Alec Peters; Christian Gossett
- Story by: Alec Peters
- Based on: Star Trek by Gene Roddenberry
- Produced by: Carter Smith; Neal Fischer; Jhennifer Webberley
- Starring: Richard Hatch; Tony Todd; Alec Peters
- Cinematography: Milton Santiago
- Edited by: Robert Meyer Burnett
- Music by: Alexander Bornstein
- Production company: Axanar Productions
- Distributed by: Axanar Productions
- Release date: July 26, 2014 (San Diego Comic-Con)
- Running time: 21 minutes
- Country: United States
- Language: English
- Budget: $80,000

Prelude to Axanar (working title: Star Trek: Prelude to Axanar, and long title: The Four Years War Part III: Prelude to Axanar) is a 2014 fan-made short film, directed by Christian Gossett and written by Gossett and Alec Peters. Funded through Kickstarter, production sought $10,000 in funding, but raised over $101,000. It had its public debut July 26, 2014, at San Diego Comic-Con.

Set in the Star Trek universe, the film stars Kate Vernon, Tony Todd, Richard Hatch, Gary Graham, and J. G. Hertzler, in a documentary-style film recounting the events surrounding the Battle of Axanar, mentioned without any detail in passing in the original Star Trek series episode "Whom Gods Destroy", here depicted as a decisive military engagement between the United Federation of Planets and the Klingon Empire.

== Plot ==
The film is presented as one episode of a Federation documentary pertaining to a "Four Years War" (a supplement of FASA's Star Trek: The Role Playing Game in the 1980s) with the Klingon Empire, narrated by fictional noted historian John Gill (who appeared in "Patterns of Force") and featuring interviews of participants on both sides. The events depicted reportedly precede Star Trek: The Original Series by two decades, with the war's opening battle at Arcanis IV, a prosperous Federation colony along the Klingon border. The Klingons, who did not consider the Federation to be a worthy adversary, maintained the initiative for the first six months of the war, with a number of victories under the leadership of their supreme commander, Kharn. The Vulcan diplomatic delegation under Ambassador Soval (who appeared on Star Trek: Enterprise), overseeing negotiations with the Klingons, are left with little room to maneuver.

In response to the losses suffered in the war, Starfleet appoints a new Commander-in-Chief, Admiral Marcus Ramirez, who pledges in a fleet-wide broadcast to defend "the dream of the Federation" against the Klingons' commitment to its destruction. Ramirez oversees the creation of the Ares-class cruisers, Starfleet's first warships, to counter the Klingons' mainstay, the D6 battlecruiser. The introduction of the Ares turns the tide against the Klingons, who begin to give Starfleet its due as a worthy opponent, and particularly take notice of Garth of Izar (who appeared in "Whom Gods Destroy"), the captain of the prototype USS Ares.

To counter the Ares cruisers, the Klingons order the construction of a newer and more advanced battlecruiser, the D7, that would restore the Klingons' technical and military advantage. In response, Starfleet begins developing their own next-generation heavy cruiser, the Constitution-class, but construction falls behind schedule. To gain more time to finish their new heavy cruiser, Starfleet approves a plan proposed by Garth to fight the Klingons at Axanar, the planet where Kharn's spies have reported the Constitution prototypes (revealed to be the Constitution and the Enterprise) are being built. The narrative concludes shortly before the battle at Axanar, when the first three D7s enter the war, leaving the audience to wonder what actually happened in the battle itself.

== Cast ==
- Richard Hatch as Kharn (also known as Kharn the Undying), Klingon Supreme Warlord
- Tony Todd as Admiral Marcus Ramirez, Starfleet Commander-in-Chief
- Kate Vernon as Captain Sonya Alexander, commanding officer of the USS Ajax
- J. G. Hertzler as Admiral Samuel Travis, former captain of the USS Hercules
- Gary Graham as Soval, Vulcan Ambassador to the Federation
- Alec Peters as Captain Kelvar Garth, commanding officer of the USS Ares

== Production ==
Alec Peters and his original production partner, co-writer, and director Christian Gossett began work on the film in 2010. Gossett's production company, Metamorfic, was brought on board, as Peters had no previous production experience. Prior to 2016, the Star Trek rights holders, primarily Paramount Pictures, had generally allowed fan-made projects to move forward just "as long as they agreed not to sell anything—including tickets, merchandise, or copies of the finished film or series". To circumvent these limitations, Peters employed both a Kickstarter campaign and a fan-funding drive that eventually exceeded his initial funding goal of $10,000, ultimately raising $101,171 from 2,123 backers.

The film was shot in two days, with a third day as a pickup to get plates of Admiral Ramirez's first speech as leader of the Federation of Planets. Cast includes Richard Hatch and J. G. Hertzler in principal roles, with Gary Graham reprising his role as Vulcan ambassador Soval. The filmmakers' stated purpose was to demonstrate that high-quality Star Trek films could be made on a low budget. The film's makeup was by Kevin Haney, sound design was by Frank Serafine, and visual effects were the work of Tobias Richter and Tommy Kraft.

== Reception ==
Jana Monji of RogerEbert.com spoke during the film's private red carpet screening at the Horton Plaza UA Cinema prior to its debut at San Diego Comic-Con, and offered that involvement of known acting talent dedicated to the genre and to Prelude to Axanar might increase Star Trek fan influence at such events. By way of example, the film's inclusion of Richard Hatch of the original TV series Battlestar Galactica would have the "fan-verse" of the two series collide in a positive manner.

Houston Press called it a functional example of "demonstration of concept", and urged Star Trek fans to see the film. They praised the cast, writing "actors (Richard Hatch, Tony Todd, etc.) have some serious chops", and noted that the film's visual effects "are stunning."

Home Media Magazine shared "the film's high production values, cinema-quality special effects and the involvement of actors from the canonical Star Trek series elevates Prelude to Axanar beyond the status of a mere fan film."

Author David Gerrold, writer of "The Trouble with Tribbles" and contributor to both the original Star Trek series and Star Trek: The Next Generation, after reading the Axanar script for the first time, stated "This is Star Trek." Gerrold later noted that his being credited as a creative consultant was a courtesy of Peters, as a result of Gerrold's earlier feedback on the Axanar draft, and the suggestion that Peters review World War II films for inspiration and understanding on both command decision making and strategic planning during wartime.

=== Awards ===
"Prelude to Axanar" won six of nine categories in the 2015 Independent Star Trek Fan Film Awards (Best Production Design; Best Visual Effects; Best Soundtrack; Best Original Story or Screenplay; Best Director; and Best Dramatic Presentation, Short Form), presented at and by Treklanta.

== Release ==
Prelude to Axanar released a three-minute teaser-trailer on June 11, 2014. The completed 21 minute short film had a private red carpet premiere July 26, 2014 at San Diego's Horton Plaza UA Cinema and its public debut screening at the 2014 San Diego Comic-Con. Available through the Axanar Productions YouTube page, the Prelude to Axanar film includes subtitles in eight languages: French, Spanish, German, Dutch, Czech and Portuguese, as well as both American and British English.

== Planned feature film ==
The Star Trek: Axanar feature-film Kickstarter campaign, launched in 2015, raised $638,471 from 8,548 backers against an initial goal of $100,000, and Peters went into pre-production with the feature originally slated to begin filming in October 2015, for an early 2016 release. Combined across the Kickstarter and Indiegogo campaigns, Axanar's total crowdfunding came to approximately $1.13 million. Approximately $200,000 of the feature campaign's total was raised in its final 49 hours, after Star Trek alum George Takei shared his interest publicly. The planned cast included Richard Hatch as Kharn the Undying (Klingon supreme commander); J. G. Hertzler as Admiral Samuel Travis (Captain of the USS Hercules); Gary Graham as Soval (Vulcan Ambassador to the Federation); and Kate Vernon as Captain Sonya Alexander (Captain of the USS Ajax').

On January 3, 2016, Alec Peters announced he would no longer portray Captain Kelvar Garth in the Axanar movie, stating that he wanted to hire a professional actor to fill the role, which would allow him to focus more on writing and producing.

In July 2020, a screenshot of actor Gary Graham's social media page showed his announcement that he had left the project. The following month, co-writer and director Paul Jenkins announced through his production company that his association with Axanar had ended. Graham died of a heart attack on January 22, 2024, at age 73, having previously reprised his Star Trek: Enterprise role of Soval in Prelude to Axanar.

In July 2022, Peters released a video on YouTube indicating that principal photography was wrapping up and that the project was proceeding to completion.

== Lawsuit ==
On December 29, 2015, CBS and Paramount Pictures filed a copyright lawsuit seeking damages in the US District Court for the Central District of California, alleging that the Axanar works infringed their rights by making use of the Klingon language and "innumerable copyrighted elements of Star Trek, including its settings, characters, species, and themes". In court filings, CBS and Paramount estimated Axanar's income from crowdfunding and related revenue at approximately $1.4 million, which informed their decision to seek actual damages rather than statutory damages of up to $150,000 per infringed work.

Reaction to the dispute among Star Trek alumni was not uniformly sympathetic to Axanar. Actor Wil Wheaton, who played Wesley Crusher on Star Trek: The Next Generation, wrote on his personal blog in March 2016 that Axanar's producers had "exploited the passion and love that Trekkies have for Star Trek to get money" and argued that the project had "put all fan films at risk" by drawing CBS and Paramount's legal scrutiny. Wheaton added his belief that they were "morally and ethically and legally in the wrong, and while I have a lot of problems with copyright and IP law, these guys are not the people I want to be the poster children for reforming those laws."

On March 28, 2016, Axanar Productions filed a motion to dismiss or strike Paramount and CBS' claims on the basis that the elements mentioned in the court filing were not protected by copyright and it was seeking premature relief from a work, the Axanar film, that did not exist.

On May 9, 2016, the motion to dismiss the lawsuit was denied. Later that month, J. J. Abrams said that "within the next few weeks, it will be announced this is going away". Abrams said he pushed the studio to stop the lawsuit, because "we realized this is not the appropriate way to deal with the fans". This statement by Abrams had no apparent effect on the lawsuit, since the case was scheduled for a jury trial in early 2017.

On June 23, 2016, Paramount and CBS released new fan film guidelines, which Axanar staff described as "disheartening" and "draconian". Alec Peters had several times suggested that the rights holders should issue guidelines to fan film makers, and even went so far as proposing his own list of guidelines after the lawsuit was filed and CBS announced their intent to release official guidelines. CBS cited crowdfunding as the reason for new and more strict Star Trek fan film guidelines.

On January 5, 2017, U.S. District Court judge R. Gary Klausner ruled that the Axanar productions were objectively substantially similar to Star Trek's copyrighted elements and rejected Axanar's fair-use defense, finding that "all four fair use factors weigh in favor of Plaintiffs"; the ruling left only the subjective "total concept and feel" question for a jury, setting the stage for a civil trial scheduled to go forward on January 31. On January 20, 2017, the parties announced that the lawsuit had been settled, with Peters and Axanar Productions promising to make "substantial changes" to Axanar and agreeing to abide by Paramount's and CBS' "Guidelines for Fan Films". Under the terms of the settlement, the filmmakers will be allowed to release two 15-minute movies, instead of their planned 90-minute feature.

Over five years later, CBS and Paramount began arbitration proceedings against Axanar Productions and Alec Peters on May 23, 2022, stemming from Peters' and Axanar's breaches of the settlement agreement. Hearings were held by JAMS on May 8 and May 9, 2023 with a final arbitration award entered on September 1, 2023. In that award, the arbiter found in support of plaintiffs CBS and Paramount, resulting in Peters owing $292,372.54 in attorney fees and costs, plus interest (at a rate of $80.10 USD per day).
