= Fairest of Them All =

- Star Trek Continues episode
- Official poster of "Fairest of Them All"
- Episode no.: Episode 3
- Directed by: James Kerwin
- Story by: Vic Mignogna
- Teleplay by: James Kerwin and Vic Mignogna
- Cinematography by: Matt Bucy
- Original air date: June 5, 2014
- Running time: 40:27

Guest appearances
- Asia DeMarcos as Marlena Moreau; Kipleigh Brown as Smith; Bobby Clark as Tharn; Michael Dorn as Computer voice

Episode chronology
← Previous "Lolani"	Next → "The White Iris"

"Fairest of Them All" is a fan-produced Star Trek episode released in 2014, the third in the web series Star Trek Continues, which aims to continue the episodes of Star Trek: The Original Series by replicating their visual and storytelling style. It was written by James Kerwin and Vic Mignogna from a story by Vic Mignogna and directed by James Kerwin. Fairest of Them All is a direct continuation of the original 1967 Star Trek episode "Mirror, Mirror". In 2014, "Fairest of Them All" won the Burbank International Film Festival award for Best New Media in Drama.

== Plot summary ==
The story begins with a recreation of the last few minutes of the original episode. In the mirror universe, "our" Kirk urges mirror universe-Spock to take command of the ISS Enterprise, spare the Halkans and find a way to make peace to prevent the Terran Empire from collapsing. He and his landing party are then transported back to the Federation "prime" universe, while their "evil" counterparts return in the alternate reality.

The evil Kirk, now in command again, is determined to either take the dilithium crystals from the Halkans or to destroy them as a show of force. When the Halkans refuse to hand over the crystals, Kirk orders a photon torpedo barrage on their planet, rejecting a diplomatic solution recommended by Spock. The pitiless attack not only wipes out the Halkans but also destroys the crystals. Spock points out that the loss of the crystals would not have happened if the Captain had followed his advice. Facing this unexpectedly strong criticism by his first officer, a visibly nervous Kirk leaves the bridge and reaches his quarters.

Meanwhile, three Andorian vessels have witnessed the attack on the Halkans and have communicated to the Enterprise that they will no longer recognize the authority of the Terran Empire, formalizing the start of a revolution. Spock informs Kirk of the Andorian ships' approach, but when Kirk orders him to destroy them if they try any aggressive moves, Spock refuses to comply. Kirk reacts to this act of insubordination by activating the Tantalus Field, a deadly device concealed in his quarters, to kill Spock. Unexpectedly, the machine does not seem to work. Kirk then calls his private guards and they head to the bridge to arrest Spock.

Spock, in the meantime, has left the bridge and has convinced Scotty to join the now explicit mutiny. They take possession of the auxiliary control room, from where they have full control of the navigation of the ship. Other crew members, sent by Kirk to eliminate Spock, are attracted to the peaceful philosophy promoted by the Vulcan and join the mutiny as well. Marlena reveals to Spock that she disabled the Tantalus Field when Kirk tried to kill him. She suggests that Spock use it to eliminate Kirk. Spock declines, replying that no revolution can succeed using the same methods applied by the previous regime.

The more time passes, the more Kirk is abandoned by his crew and feels helpless, to the point that he asks Spock to meet at the officer's lounge to discuss a potential compromise. Spock accepts the invitation, well aware that the meeting could hide a trap. When the two men face each other, Kirk tries to shoot Spock, but the Vulcan reveals that all the weapons have been disabled by a dampening field. Kirk, enraged at the failure of the attempt, attacks Spock and during a pause in the fight shouts his thoughts about the crew, stating that they are just expendable pawns to reach his goals. Unbeknownst to him, his statements are being broadcast to the entire ship by Spock, showing the crew the real nature of their leader. Two guards then enter the officer's lounge and, to Kirk's surprise, arrest and finally neutralize him.

Spock gives a shuttlecraft to Kirk and the few crew members still loyal to him, so that they can reach the nearest habitable system. Spock states that he is aware that the entire Terran fleet will try to stop the Enterprise and his attempts to build a peaceful Empire, but that he must try. In the last scene, Spock takes command of the bridge as Captain and gives the navigator the order to move "forward".

== Production and release ==
"Fairest of Them All" was one of the episodes of the series funded through a successful Kickstarter campaign held from October 7 to November 6, 2013.

As with every episode of Star Trek Continues, the shooting of the Enterprise scenes took place in Kingsland, Georgia, at the facility owned by Farragut Films and their partners. According to the end credits of the episode, a scene was shot on location at NASA's Space Center Houston, home of the restored life-size prop of the original Star Trek Galileo shuttlecraft.

Principal photography began in March 2014 and the shooting was completed in May 2014. According to director James Kerwin, one of the biggest production challenges for this episode was to create the alternate universe costumes for many cast members, which had to match as close as possible those worn in the "Mirror, Mirror" episode.

Guest cast for this episode included:

- Asia DeMarcos as Marlena Moreau
- Kipleigh Brown as Smith (Brown previously appeared as Jane Taylor in the Star Trek: Enterprise episode "The Forgotten")
- Bobby Clark as Council Leader Tharn (Clark previously played the Gorn Captain in The Original Series episode "Arena", as well as portraying Chekov's guard in "Mirror, Mirror")
- Bobby Quinn Rice as Crewman (Rice previously portrayed Lieutenant Ro Nevin in the online series Star Trek: Hidden Frontier, and Ensign Peter Kirk in the fan series Star Trek: Phase II, plus others)
- Michael Dorn as the computer of the ISS Enterprise (Dorn played Worf in Star Trek: The Next Generation and Star Trek: Deep Space Nine, and 5 Star Trek feature films)

On June 4, 2014, TrekMovie.com published exclusive photos of the cast, announcing also the date of the release of the episode. The episode was premiered at Supanova 2014 in Sydney, Australia, on June 15, 2014 and was at the same time released on the official Star Trek Continues YouTube and Vimeo channels.

== Reception ==
The reviews of "Fairest of Them All" have been very positive. Bill Watters of TrekMovie.com pointed out how the episode resembled one of those of TOS, writing: "Star Trek Continues does deserve the 'Continues' in its title as they do a really strong job at capturing (and yes, 'continuing') the atmosphere of TOS." and author John Birmingham shared a similar sentiment, stating: "As storytelling goes, it is fast paced, entertaining and captures that essence of the original series. In that regard, I'd give this episode a strong thumbs up."

Wired has dedicated to "Fairest of Them All" a copy of their video series Obsessed, that aims to highlight "what happens when people live out their obsessions to the fullest." In the video, Mignogna and other people of the staff are interviewed and explain to what extent they have paid attention to detail to recreate the same visual style of the original Star Trek episode "Mirror, Mirror".

The production values of the episode were highlighted, among others, by Sam Sloan of Slice of SciFi, who wrote: "Vic Mignogna and the cast and crew of Star Trek Continues have proven, once again with this episode of the ongoing voyage of the original Star Trek that this rendering of the show is on par with that original series and continues to amaze those who are watching it." and by Josh Edelglass of MotionPicturesComics.com, who stated: "Even more impressive for this episode, the production team has exactingly recreated the look of the Mirror Universe sets and costumes."

More than one reviewer praised the performance of Todd Haberkorn. Clive Burrell wrote on Some kind of Star Trek: "Todd Haberkorn is excellent as Spock, charting quite a change in the Mirror universe version of the character from cold, calculating officer to peacemaker in 40 minutes" and Josh Edelglass wrote: "Todd Haberkorn gets a real showcase as Mr. Spock in this episode, and he's great. He's a little stiff in that opening scene in the transporter room, but after that I think he turns in a stellar performance."

Both Slice of SciFi and Some Kind of Star Trek commented also on the strong resemblance between Asia DeMarcos and BarBara Luna, the actress who portrayed the character Marlena Moreau in "Mirror, Mirror".

In September 2014 Fairest of Them All won the award for Best New Media - Drama at Burbank International Film Festival.

== See also ==
- "Mirror, Mirror"
- Star Trek fan productions
- Snow White – the Brothers Grimm fairy tale from which the expression "fairest of them all" comes.
