= Yesterday Was a Lie =

2008 film by James Kerwin

- Theatrical release poster
- Directed by: James Kerwin
- Written by: James Kerwin
- Produced by: Chase Masterson
- Starring: Kipleigh Brown; Chase Masterson; John Newton
- Cinematography: Jason Cochard
- Edited by: James Kerwin
- Music by: Kristopher Carter
- Distributed by: Entertainment One; IndiePix Films
- Release dates: January 17, 2008 (Park City Film Music Fest.); December 11, 2009 (US)
- Running time: 89 minutes
- Country: United States
- Language: English
- Budget: $200,000

Yesterday Was a Lie is a 2008 neo-noir film written and directed by James Kerwin and starring Kipleigh Brown, Chase Masterson, John Newton, and Mik Scriba. In publicity materials, the film has been described as a combination of science fantasy and film noir. The film had its commercial release in 2009.

== Plot ==
A hard-drinking female investigator named Hoyle (Kipleigh Brown) sets out to locate a reclusive genius (John Newton) who may be able to distort reality. Instead she finds her life becoming more and more fragmented and surreal. Trusting only her partner (Mik Scriba) and a sexy lounge singer (Chase Masterson), she is shadowed by a dangerous man (Peter Mayhew).

== Cast ==
- Kipleigh Brown as Hoyle
- Chase Masterson as Singer
- John Newton as Dudas
- Mik Scriba as Trench Coat Man
- Nathan Mobley as Lab Assistant
- Warren Davis as Psychiatrist
- Megan Henning as Student
- Jennifer Slimko as Nurse
- Robert Siegel as Radio Interviewer
- Peter Mayhew as Dead Man

== Production ==
Yesterday Was a Lie was in production from August 13 to September 15, 2006. In March 2007, a trailer of the film premièred at San Francisco Wondercon. In August 2007, the film's official blog announced the completion of a test cut of the motion picture.

== Release ==
=== Festival run ===
The early cut of the film began a series of film festival screenings on January 17, 2008 at the Park City Film Music Festival, where it received a Director's Choice Award. The film went on to receive Best Feature awards at numerous festivals, including the ShockerFest International Film Festival, as well as a bronze Telly Award and the Best of Show Accolade Award. It was awarded the Best Director, Best Screenplay, and Best Cinematography trophies at Visionfest, the Best Actress prize (for Brown) at ShockerFest, and the Best Producer prize (for Masterson) at the LA Femme Film Festival.

In early July 2008, San Diego Comic-Con announced that the test cut of Yesterday Was a Lie would be presented as the closing film of its 2008 convention.

In October 2008, the film's official blog announced that a newer cut of the film would be shown at the St. Louis International Film Festival. In December 2008, the Beverly Hills Hi-Def Film Festival announced the new cut of the film would have its theatrical première at the closing night film of its 2009 festival.

=== Theatrical release ===
In August 2009, Yesterday Was a Lie was acquired by Entertainment One. According to the film's official blog, a new cut of the film, featuring an updated soundtrack and other changes, was created for the formal release. Yesterday Was a Lie was released theatrically in the U.S. on December 11, 2009.

=== Home video ===
The film was released on DVD on April 6, 2010.

In 2019, Yesterday Was a Lie was acquired by IndiePix Films. The film was remastered and given a "tenth anniversary" re-release in November on DVD, digital, and, for the first time, on Blu-ray. The re-released discs included deleted shots, outtakes presented by Brown and Kerwin, and video of the cast's WonderCon panel, in addition to the commentary track and behind-the-scenes special features which were included on the earlier Entertainment One DVDs.

== Reception ==
In a review published after the film's U.S. theatrical opening, Variety praised the film's "stunning black-and-white HD cinematography" and "impressively atmospheric tone" and its recreation of the "classical Hollywood [visual] aesthetic". The film's "sultry jazz score" was also singled out for mention. However, the review also criticized the casting of the film—calling the acting "stiff" and "hopelessly amateurish"—as well as the plot, which it described as a "clunky David Lynchian cosmic mystery" leading to "grand (yet underwhelming) revelations about the nature of reality."

Other mainstream reviewers were critical of the film as well. Kevin Thomas in the Los Angeles Times wrote that "The film seems like an atmospheric shampoo commercial in which glamorous models pose in gritty back alleys with fog machines going full force. ... There's lots of talk about the 'interconnected of consciousness' and 'the totality of consciousness' and how those who can plug into it can control reality ... [The] film is hard to connect with and is way too vague to inspire the urge to try to do so." while John Wheeler in LA Weekly wrote that the film's "pitch" was "'a metaphysical noir about a beautiful alcoholic detective searching for the key to understanding nonlinear time'" but commented that the "film can't hope to live up to that premise, and it doesn't." It comments that "the film jumps around aimlessly, repeating dialogue and images of Hoyle's search while using non sequitur discussions of Dalí and Eliot to justify its often impenetrably surreal structure." It praises the film as being in "gorgeous black-and-white and lit by some extremely competent artisans" but concludes that "the film is finally too disjointed and incomprehensible to be enjoyed as much else besides an exercise in style."

The Epoch Times newspaper, Collider.com, Ain't It Cool, and KGO resident film critic Dennis Willis all reviewed the film positively, with Willis calling Yesterday "nothing less than the arrival of a major filmmaker." Author Robert J. Sawyer blogged that the movie was "the most thoughtful and compelling science fiction film of 2009" (a quote subsequently used in press materials). The film received a positive review from The Numbers following its DVD release.

Yesterday Was a Lie has a rating of 83% on the Rotten Tomatoes website.

== Soundtrack ==
In February 2011, La-La Land Records announced the February 15 release of the Kristopher Carter score on CD and digital download, including songs performed by Masterson from the film. The physical CD included two bonus tracks, "Can You Help Me?" and "City Talks", not included in the digital download. The album was well received, with Daniel Schweiger of Film Music Magazine calling it "a top notch indie score in all respects."

== Spin-offs ==
=== Graphic novel ===
The film has been adapted into a limited edition graphic novel by artist James Hill, first released as a San Diego Comic-Con Exclusive at 2010's Comic-Con International.

=== Web series ===
A seven-episode Yesterday Was a Lie viral web series, based on Nathan Mobley's "Lab Assistant" character from the feature film, debuted on Blip.tv in January 2011, and is also viewable as an Easter egg on the film's official site.
