= Embracing the Winds =

- Star Trek Continues episode
- Episode no.: Episode 7
- Directed by: James Kerwin
- Story by: James Kerwin
- Teleplay by: James Kerwin; Vic Mignogna
- Cinematography by: Matt Bucy
- Original air date: September 3, 2016
- Running time: 43:56

Guest appearances
- Clare Kramer as Cmdr. Garrett; Erin Gray as Commodore Gray; Beau Billingslea as Vice Admiral Stomm; Marina Sirtis as Computer Voice

Episode chronology
← Previous "Come Not Between the Dragons"	Next → "Still Treads the Shadow"

"Embracing The Winds" is the seventh episode of the Star Trek fan series Star Trek Continues, which sought to emulate and continue the original Star Trek series. It first aired on 3 September 2016.

== Plot ==
Kirk and Spock are traveling to the Starbase at Corinth IV for a classified briefing, while Sulu and McKennah take some leisure time: Sulu to visit a museum, McKennah to chase up the social changes in Orion society following the Enterprise's incident with Zaminhon and the slave girl Lolani.

At the starbase, Kirk and Spock are greeted by Commodore Laura Gray, who informs them that the crew of the Hood has been lost due to life support systems failure. The Enterprise has been sent to tow the Hood home and due to several losses across the quadrant, when the Hood starts out again, it will need experienced officers assigned to it. She formally offers Spock a promotion to captain.

Meanwhile, with Scott in command, the Enterprise is investigating what happened to the Hood. Science officer Follet suggests it may be connected to the subspace anomaly they were investigating.

Back at Corinth IV, Gray informs Kirk and Spock of a complication. Commander Diana Garrett, first officer of Earth's Space Dock, had applied for the captaincy of the Hood but was turned down. She has now launched a formal appeal, stating she has been overlooked because she is a woman. Kirk and Spock are shocked at such an assertion in the 23rd century. Gray states that Tellarite diplomacy may be a factor, as 100 years ago the Federation was formed due to an alliance of humans, Vulcans, Andorians and Tellarites united against the Romulan incursion. Tellar Prime's resources played an important factor in the Federation's victory. Tellarite society frowns on females being starship captains, especially of constitution-class starships which are top-of-the-line, despite Starfleet having plenty of female captains in its history. However, although Starfleet and the Federation are not bound by Tellarite views, since the controversial admission of Coridan to the Federation, the Tellarites have indicated they may leave the Federation, robbing it of a vital resource and ally. Gray asks Kirk to interview Garrett and decide if she is a suitable candidate. Both Kirk and Spock are troubled by the notion that Starfleet may be engaging in undue bias against women, but also are both conflicted by the fact that Spock would have to leave the Enterprise.

On the Enterprise, all other systems on the Hood appear to be normal, nor is there any sign of the anomaly they were investigating. Scotty decides to learn more about what happened before they tow the ship home.

Spock confers with Dr. McKennah regarding Garrett and her claims. McKennah believes the Tellarite threats are not to be taken seriously, but there might be another issue at work. She states that how people evaluate others is a many-layered process and that if bias does exist, it is often subconscious. Spock, who knows what it is like to be treated differently agrees; however, he notes that there are incidents in Garrett's service record that warrant scrutiny, and this may be why she is being overlooked rather than her sex. McKennah asks Spock if Garrett would be under the same amount of scrutiny if she was male and Spock believes so although he cannot be sure if everyone else would concur.

Garrett arrives at Corinth IV with Vice Admiral Stomm, Kirk interviews her briefly and is impressed with her record; however, when he questions her about an incident she was involved in at Nimbus III where her captain was killed, Garrett refuses to discuss the incident and becomes defensive. She then calls a halt to the interview and leaves, leaving Kirk dumbfounded.

Later on, Gray informs Kirk that Garrett has now demanded a formal hearing to determine the captaincy of the Hood. The board will be presided by Gray, Stomm, and Kirk.

On the Enterprise, Ensign Chekov attempts to provide power to the Hood's engine room, long enough for several hours of life support to better determine what happened. However, he is disappointed when Uhura and Follet are selected to go on the away team and he is not. Uhura has noticed he feels overlooked and points out that while he has many skills, he is not focused and should prioritize which department will best suit his talent.

Back on Corinth IV, the hearing begins with Gray presiding. The Vulcan admiral Stomm questions Spock regarding his youth and whether his emotions and his human heritage played a part in his career choices, referring to when he turned down admission to the Vulcan Science Academy. Kirk objects as Spock's racial background should not have a bearing on his career outcome. Stomm counters by saying that the skills and abilities of all individuals are products of their race, religion, and even sex. Kirk, to quash any doubts of his favoring of Spock, states that while it is definitely time for a woman to command a frontline Constitution-class starship, he is not sure if Garrett is the right woman to do so.

When Garrett takes the stand, it is noted that she has a lot more qualifications and been decorated more times by Starfleet than Spock. On paper she would make an ideal captain; however, Gray brings up the Nimbus III incident, which concerns her. The official investigation into the incident suggested human error. Garrett disputes it by saying the report was conducted by a Tellarite, who may have had a bias against her and she protested the findings; it was determined that she was cleared of any wrongdoing. Gray also notes that Garrett and her other officers pled the seventh guarantee during the inquiry, where they refused to answer the questions presented to them to avoid self-incrimination. Once again Garrett denies any wrongdoing, as by law, pleading the seventh cannot be used to imply guilt. Gray states that she is concerned that there are other similar incidents in Garrett's record and it seems that Garrett reacts with hostility whenever her judgment is questioned, as part of being a Captain is being able to admit when one was wrong and take responsibility. Garrett states that she reacts with hostility because of the undue scrutiny she believes she receives as a woman and is once again adamant that she was not in the wrong.

In the Hood's engine room, Uhura, Scott, Follet, and Drake can find no evidence on an anomaly that could have caused the system failure which killed the crew. Suddenly out of nowhere, the Hood's engines activate and begin to overload, and their shield comes online, meaning the Enterprise cannot beam them out. The ship will explode in minutes.

Scott orders Lt. Hadley to clear away before the Hood explodes, but Chekov believes he can transmit a duotronic algorithm to the Hood, which would deactivate its shields. Scott protests, claiming it is too dangerous. Hadley allows Chekov to proceed, the circuits overload, and Chekov collapses, but it works and the Enterprise is able to beam the away team home just before the Hood explodes.

On Corinth, Stomm endorses Garrett for captaincy and Gray endorses Spock; however, before Kirk can vote, Gray is informed that the Hood has been destroyed, rendering the proceeding useless. Before it ends, Garrett declares that even though the Hood has been destroyed, the issue still remains that female officers are being overlooked for Captaincy and while it may not be intentional, it still exists and it is time something was done about it. Starfleet has the opportunity to implement change; although Garrett may not be a captain this time, there are still plenty of women who could be. Everyone agrees.

On the Enterprise, Chekov is recovering and Scott is admonishing him for his foolish actions, Chekov agrees but is confused when Scott refers to him as lieutenant. Scott has informed an admiral of his bravery and original thinking which has earned him a promotion. Despite the happiness, Scott is still worried about the mystery surrounding the Hood. Uhura thanks Chekov for saving them.

Kirk meanwhile is speaking with the Tellarite ambassador, who states that he is aware the biased view his people have of women is not in keeping with Federation values or modern standards and that he is part of a movement trying to make changes and tells Kirk when the time comes for a female captain, Starfleet will have his support. Kirk appreciates that Tellar Prime is embracing the winds of change.

In the final scene, Kirk and Spock meet with Garrett one last time. Garrett and Kirk part ways having developed a mutual respect for each other, Garrett hopes that one day a Garrett will command an Enterprise, and Kirk states that anything is possible. When Garrett leaves, both Spock and Kirk agree that despite sadness for the loss of the Hood, both are also somewhat glad as it means they will not have to separate. They then head back to the Enterprise.

== Trivia ==
Garrett hopes that someday a Garrett will command an Enterprise. Nearly 80 years later Rachel Garrett is in command of the Enterprise C, as seen in The Next Generation 1990 episode "Yesterday's Enterprise".

This episode connects to the rebooted Star Trek films, where despite the change in reality, Spock still turns down a place at the Vulcan Science Academy, being the first person to do so and it is subtly implied he did it out of spite after the admissions council were disrespectful to Spock's human mother.

The episode also addresses some inconsistencies regarding female captains in the series. In the Original Series, it is implied in "Turnabout Intruder" by Janice Lester that women cannot be starship captains, which obviously would be discriminatory and not keeping with the Federation's values of equality. However, the line could have also been interpreted in other ways; for example, Lester was mentally unstable and possibly was not able to be a captain because of these issues. Lester was also bitter about her failed relationship with Kirk and may have also been stating as a captain, Kirk would not let her, a woman, get close. Later in the episode, Kirk, while trapped in Lester's body, stated that Lester craved power but her own issues prevented her career from progressing and were why their relationship failed. Leonard Nimoy stated at the time, and later Gene Roddenberry admitted, the line was purely sexist. In this episode, Kirk correctly states that from Starfleet's inception there have been female captains; but Commodore Grey points out they haven't been starship captains. This is consistent with Dr. Lester's line, "your world of starship captains doesn't admit women".

Also of note: in the opening scene of the episode, Sulu mentions that his great(x6) grandfather grew up in an internment camp during WWII. This is no doubt an homage to George Takei, the first actor to portray Sulu during the Original Series run. Takei, in fact, spent time in an internment camp during WWII.

This episode serves as the start of a story arc regarding the mystery of what happened aboard the USS Hood, which is resolved in the series finale.
