= Star Trek: Intrepid =

2007 fan film series

Star Trek: Intrepid is a series of live action fan films produced in Dundee, Scotland. The first video, Heavy Lies the Crown, was released on 26 May 2007. A trailer, various outtakes, cast and character information and a forum are available on their website. As the title would suggest, the production is based on the voyages of the USS Intrepid, the prototype for the Intrepid-class, the same type of vessel as the USS Voyager. Footage from Intrepid has appeared on GMTV CNN, ZDF and in Channel 4 news features, and articles about the film have appeared in many newspapers, such as The Guardian The Scotsman and The Daily Record. GMTV presenter Lorraine Kelly also has a brief appearance in Heavy Lies the Crown. Intrepid was also featured on the UK Sci Fi Channel's Sci Fi 360 video podcast.

== Films ==
=== Heavy Lies The Crown ===
Stardate: 59422.9

Heavy Lies the Crown is set a few years after Star Trek: Nemesis, and features the Federation Starfleet and the Merchant Service attempting to colonise the Charybdis Sector, a region far from the Federation's core.

Whilst surveying the planet, Merchant Service officers Dr. Garren and Captain Merik attempt to contact the Ariadne. Finding that both of their combadges are not functioning, they head back to the settlement.

An unknown, organic ship approaches Intrepid from the colony. When challenged, the vessel opens fire upon the Intrepid. Easily disabled by a single phaser strike, the alien vessel self-destructs to avoid capture.

The crew determines that an energy dampening field has disabled the colonial convoy, leaving them without life support. Despite their best efforts, the crew can only pin the location of the field generator down to a two kilometre radius somewhere on the planet. Against Navar's advice, Captain Hunter leads an away team to pinpoint the generator.

In space, a number of Surai ships drop out of warp, heading towards the planet. A fifteen-minute deadline is set for the away team.

Meanwhile, having found the generator, Caed's team frantically tries to fend off drone attacks as Intrepid tries to hold off the Surai vessels.

S'Ceris, Hunter, Garren and Merik arrive, holding off the drones. As Prentice prepares to obliterate the target area, and every living thing in it, a quick-thinking S'Ceris uses his combadge to provide a precise target lock for Intrepid's phasers. The generator is destroyed, shutting off the field, and disabling the drones. The Surai vessels retreat, and Prentice opts not to pursue them.

Heavy Lies the Crown was released on 26 May 2007. It features both actual sets and use of green screen. The exterior sequences of ships, including the titular USS Intrepid were rendered using LightWave.

=== The Conviction of Demons ===
The description of The Conviction of Demons on the Intrepid Encyclopedia makes it appear as more of a direct sequel to Heavy Lies the Crown. It is 60 minutes in length, longer than Heavy Lies the Crown was.

"While the Merchant Service prepares to make a final stand to defend the colony, Intrepid desperately hunts the one man who may hold the key to averting disaster."

=== Other films ===
- Orphans of War: A collaboration between Executive Producers Nick Cook and Rob Caves, the creator of Hidden Frontier and Odyssey. Cook (Captain Hunter), his wife Lucy (Lieutenant Caed) and David Reid (Lieutenant S'Ceris) travelled to Rob Caves' studio in California to film this ten-minute film set shortly after Iliad, the first episode of Star Trek: Odyssey. The Intrepid joins forces with the Excelsior to investigate an Archein weapons system left behind from their abortive invasion of Romulan space. Released 13 November 2007.
- Operation Beta Shield: Released in October 2008. It reunited the casts of Hidden Frontier and Intrepid in a full-length film involving rumours of a second Archien Wormhole, and the possibility of a new invasion.
- Transitions and Lamentations: The discovery of an older colony on Chiron IV leads an away team into danger. Meanwhile, Navar must decide where his loyalty truly lies. Released 29 April 2009. This is Star Trek Intrepid's 4th release, although sequentially in the series the events follow one week after "Heavy Lies the Crown" and prior to "Where There's a Sea" and "Turning Point".
- Where There's A Sea...: This 11-minute short revolves around the Ariadne escorting a supply colony when it comes under attack from Orions. It was released on 25 July 2008.
- Turning Point: Star Trek Intrepid's stand-alone 3rd release. Released 8 October 2008. Running Time 7 Minutes.
- One of Our Own: Star Trek Intrepid's 5th stand-alone release. When word reaches Shelby that a dear friend may still be alive, she and Hunter embark on a rescue mission. Released 30 November 2010. Running Time 7:43 Minutes.
- Machinations: In an attempt to decipher the situation with the Surai, Commander Navar must look to someone whose relationship with the Intrepid crew is less than ideal. This 8 minute vignette was released in Summer 2011.
- Confessions by Firelight: In the wake of the recent Surai attack, Merik confronts Finney over the Colonial Administration's decision to defer to Starfleet in military matters. Released late 2011.
- The Stone Unturned: An unexpected visit from Jean-Luc Picard thrusts Intrepid into the middle of an archaeological mystery and a race against time. Released in 2013.
- Transposition: The crew pursue a renegade scientist into Earth's past. This seven minute vignette was released Sep 3, 2015.
- Nemo Me Impune Lacessit: When a routine inspection goes awry, Hunter and Garren must work together. Released in 2015, with a running time of 11:10.
- Duty of Care: A shuttle accident strands Nurse Parker and a badly injured Security Chief Goran on an uninhabited world. Released in 2017, with a running time of 8:26.
- The Story: A mysterious message draws the crew to an ancient world. Released in 2018, with a running time of 6:26.
- Dissonant Minds: When a routine survey takes an unexpected turn, the possibility of biological warfare causes tensions to flare between Starfleet and the colonists. Released Feb 8, 2020, with a running time of 18:52.
- A Treasure For The Ages: Eklund's World. Years ago, Daniel Hunter sought its fabled treasure. At a cost. Now he has a chance to revisit that world and its mysteries. But will the price of the past be Hunter's own future? Released Jul 5, 2020, with a running time of 17:40.

== Cast and crew ==
=== USS Intrepid Main Personnel ===
Character	Actor	Rank	Position
Daniel John Hunter	Nick Cook	Captain	Commanding Officer, USS Intrepid
Yanis Caed	Lucy Faria-Cook	Lieutenant	Chief of Operations, USS Intrepid
Matthew Cole	Steve Pasqua	Lieutenant	Mission Operations Officer, USS Intrepid
S'Ceris	David Reid	Lieutenant	Chief of Security, USS Intrepid
Michael Simmons	Nick Beckwith	Lieutenant	Ship's Counselor, USS Intrepid
Leransilia sh'Talath	Shire Smith (voice)	Captain	Former Commanding Officer, USS Intrepid (deceased)
Aaron Prentice	Alan Score	Rear Admiral	Commander of Operations in the Charybdis Sector
Jacen Navar	Alan Christison	Lieutenant Commander	Starfleet Intelligence Officer in the Charybdis Sector
Joseph Garren	Gordon Dickson	Lieutenant Commander	Adjutant to Admiral Prentice
Jago Merik	Steve Hammond	Captain, Merchant Marine	Master of S.S. Ariadne
Dr. Richard Garren	Mike Cugley	None	Science Officer, S.S. Ariadne

=== Supporting cast ===
Character	Actor(s)	Rank	Position
Harek T'yla	Jeff Hayes	Admiral	Commander of Starbase 592
Elizabeth Shelby	Risha Denney	Captain/Rear Admiral	Commanding Officer, USS Excelsior
Corin Gaines	Roy MacPhail	Lieutenant	Chief Engineer, USS Intrepid
Sanjita Raman	Ferdos Ahmed	Lieutenant	Watch Officer, USS Intrepid
Keran Azhan	Alex Matthews	Lieutenant Junior Grade	Starfleet Intelligence officer specializing in linguistics
Faldor	Martin Lejeune	Ensign	Engineer, USS Intrepid
Sarah Stiles	Jen Graham	Ensign	Junior Science Officer and Pilot, USS Intrepid
Karyn Finney	Lyn McGarrity	Governor	Leader of Chiron IV

=== Film Crew ===
- Lee Andrew – Visual Effects Artist, Sound Design
- Jon Carling – Visual Effects Artist
- Nick Cook – Executive producer, editor, writer
- Gordon Dickson – Set construction
- Lucie Faria-Cook – Makeup artist
- Bodo Hartwig – Music and Dialogue processing
- David Reid – Makeup artist and set construction
- David Beukes – Main score composer
- Dylan Feeney – Main theme composer
- Steve Hammond – Director of Photography, editor, and visual effects artist
- Mike Cugley – Visual effects artist
- Jeff Hayes – Graphics and banners on the website
- Steve Pasqua – Camera, Assistant Director

== Ships ==
Star Trek: Intrepid features two vessels, Starfleet's Intrepid, and the Merchant Service's Ariadne.

=== USS Intrepid (NCC-74600) ===
The USS Intrepid

Intrepid was the prototype of the Intrepid-class. The Intrepid was launched from Utopia Planitia Shipyards on 12 November 2370. It can sustain Warp 9.984 for 12 hours, or Warp 9.992 for twenty minutes. It has a number of shuttlecraft, including Reyga and Nazca (Type 9 shuttles), Dathon (Type 11 shuttle), Ballard and Forest (Type 16 shuttlepods) and the Aeroshuttle Gabriel Bell. The Intrepid's dedication plaque has a quote from Arthur C. Clarke, "The only way to discover the limits of the possible, is to go beyond them into the impossible."

=== SS Ariadne (NAR-11402) ===
The SS Ariadne

The second ship that Star Trek: Intrepid follows is the SS Ariadne, which (unlike the canon Intrepid-class Intrepid) is an original design from Ships of the Starfleet (volume 2). The Ariadne is a retired Starfleet ship of the Akyazi-class, now operated by the Merchant Service. She is commanded by Captain Merik, and in 2382 was assigned to the Chiron Colonial Convoy in a joint effort between Starfleet and the Merchant Service to colonise Chiron IV. The science officer is Dr. Richard Garren, the helmsman Rafael Batista and the engineer Gita Nagaraj.

Ariadne is armed with phasers.

Ariadne had a minor role in the first film, appearing in the opening montage and a brief scene in orbit only, although its crew had a larger role. It became more central in the following episodes.

=== The Chiron Colonial Convoy ===
The Chiron Colonial Convoy

A number of ships make up the Chiron IV Colonial Convoy. Most of the vessels are quite old; many are pre-Star Trek: The Original Series, and with spherical hulls bear resemblance to the Daedalus class of this era. Also in the convoy is an old Oberth-class science ship from the TOS era. Ariadne and Intrepid were assigned to this convoy. As its name might suggest, the goal of the Chiron Colonial Convoy was to successfully colonise the planet of Chiron IV, on the fringes of Federation space. However, the convoy ran into a few problems in the form of the alien race known as the Surai in the attempt.

== The Surai ==
The Surai are a nonhumanoid species native to the Charybdis sector. They use organic-based technology, including bioships. The Surai scoutships appear to be smaller than an Intrepid class starship, placing them around the 100-metre to 200-metre mark. The scoutships use weaponry based on blue pulses of energy, similar in appearance to the pulse phasers used by the Defiant. Although the majority of Intrepid's crew do not appear to know who the Surai are, Lieutenant-Commander Navar apparently has access to a secret briefing on the mysterious species.

== The Charybdis Sector ==
The Charybdis sector is located away from the main disc of the galaxy in the vertical plane, resulting in a fairly sparse stellar population. The sector has been surveyed, but not in great detail.

The planet Chiron IV, an earthlike planet, exists in this sector. It is reportedly ruled by the obscenely rich Kaibaman.
