= James Kerwin =

American director

James Kerwin FRSA
- Born: October 13, 1973 (age 53); St. Louis, Missouri, US
- Citizenship: United States; Republic of Ireland
- Occupations: Director, screenwriter
- Years active: 1995–present
- Website: jameskerwin.com

James Kerwin, FRSA (born October 13, 1973) is an American film director, theatre director, and screenwriter.

== Education and academics ==
Kerwin, who was born in St. Louis, Missouri, attended Parkway Central High School in Chesterfield.

In 1995, he graduated magna cum laude with a B.S.(Hons) in film production and a minor degree in astronomy and physics from T.C.U., where he studied under theoretical physicist Freeman Dyson. He served as a lab instructor and guest artist at T.C.U. and the University of Texas at Austin.

Kerwin is a member of Phi Beta Kappa and Mensa, and is a Fellow of the Royal Society of Arts.

== Career ==
Kerwin has been noted for his Shakespearean adaptations of A Midsummer Night's Dream, Cardenio and Venus and Adonis. In 2003 he staged Amber Benson's play Albert Hall in Los Angeles, California. In the early 2000s he was a frequent guest director for Daniel Henning and Noah Wyle's Blank Theatre Company and for Travis Schuldt's Lone Star Ensemble.

In 2000, Kerwin's experimental film Midsummer—produced by L.M. Kit Carson and starring Domenica Cameron-Scorsese—received the Gold Award from Edward Zwick at the Crested Butte Reel Fest.

Other projects include the "sci-fi noir" film Yesterday Was a Lie with Kipleigh Brown and Chase Masterson, which earned a number of prizes on the film festival circuit in 2008 and 2009. He and Brown again collaborated on Star Trek Continues, on which Kerwin served as writer/director from 2014 to 2017.

In 2020, Kerwin and actress Nicola Bryant co-hosted the video podcast In Isolation.

The MMORPG Star Trek Online features Kerwin as a non-player character, voiced by actor Jordan Reynolds.

Brendan Fraser's character in Robert J. Sawyer's 2023 Audible production The Downloaded—which opens with a quote attributed to Kerwin, read by actress Vanessa Sears—references him when naming historical filmmakers.

== Personal life ==
Kerwin's nieces—Elara and Rhea Kerwin—portrayed Summer Newman on The Young and the Restless.

His family is one of the original fourteen Tribes of Galway.

Coat of arms of James Kerwin
Crest A shelldrake close, sable, beaked and legged. Escutcheon A chevron, between three shelldrakes, sable, beaked and legged. Motto Mon Dieu, mon Roi et ma patrie (My God, my King and my country)
