= Kipleigh Brown =

American actress and artist

- Occupation: Actress
- Years active: 1994–2025
- Notable work: Star Trek: Enterprise; Yesterday Was a Lie
- Website: kipleigh.com

Kipleigh Brown is an American actress.

== Career ==
She had the lead role in James Kerwin's sci-fi noir film Yesterday Was a Lie, and played Jane Taylor on the television series Star Trek: Enterprise. As of 2016, she was also performing in the improv comedy troupe at the iO West in Los Angeles.

In 2014, Brown played the part of Barbara Smith in the fan-produced Star Trek Continues episode "Fairest of Them All". Later that year, it was announced she would continue as a recurring character in the series.

In 2015, Brown began providing the voice of Kuumaarke in Star Trek Online.

== Filmography ==
- Design (2002) - Heather
- Star Trek: Enterprise episode "The Forgotten" (2004) - Crewman 2nd Class Jane Taylor
- The Suite Life of Zack & Cody episode "Rumors" (2005) - TV Reporter
- Relative Strangers (2006) - Big Guy's Girl
- Yesterday Was a Lie (2009) - Hoyle
- R.U.R.: Genesis (2013) - Fabry
- Star Trek Continues (2014–2017) - Lt. junior grade Barbara Smith
- Star Trek Online (2015–2025) - Kuumaarke (voice role)
