= Iron Alps Complex Fire =

2008 wildfire in Northern California

- Part of 2008 California wildfires
- A satellite image of the June 2008 Northern California Wildfires on July 18. The Iron Alps Complex is visible and labeled just to the left of the center.
- Date: June 20 –; September 5, 2008 (79 days)
- Location: Trinity County, California, United States
- Coordinates: 40.7325°N 123.0539°W

Statistics
- Burned area: 105,805 acres (42,818 hectares)

Impacts
- Injuries: >=6
- Evacuated: Several towns
- Structures destroyed: >=2
- Cost: $74 million (firefighting costs)

Ignition
- Cause: Lightning

Map
- Location of the Iron Alps Complex Fire.

The 2008 Iron Alps Complex Fire, also called the Iron/Alps Complex Fire, was a large wildfire complex in Trinity County, California, United States. The complex comprised 48 fires, 36 of which were in the Iron Complex, and 12 in the Alps Complex, all of which were ignited by lightning on June 21. (Note: USFS states June 20.) The main fires were the Buckhorn Fire, the Eagle Fire, the Ironsides Fire, the Cedar Fire, and the Ziegler fire. The fires, many of which merged, burned a total of 105,805 (Note: USFS states 105,367 acres) acres (42,838 hectares) before the complex was declared fully contained on September 5 (Note: CAL FIRE's last update declared the fire as 98% contained on September 4.), with a total firefighting cost of about $74 million ($108 million in 2025).

While the fires burned largely in remote areas of the Shasta–Trinity National Forest and only destroyed 2 or 10 structures, a helicopter crash in the course of firefighting operations killed nine personnel. After a lengthy investigation and litigation, contractor Carson Helicopters (responsible for maintaining and operating the helicopter) was found to have falsified weight calculations, leading to fines and imprisonment for two executives.

The Iron Alps Complex was one of several wildfire complexes in California during the state's 2008 wildfire season, including the even larger Klamath Theater Complex and Basin Complex fires in Siskiyou and Monterey counties respectively. The complex would end up as the third-largest and deadliest fire in California in 2008.

== Background ==
Large amounts of California were in drought between the years 2007-2009. In March 2008, Governor Arnold Schwarzenegger declared a statewide drought, the first since 1991. It was also the first drought where a statewide proclamation of emergency was issued. March–October 2008 was the driest 8-month period ever recorded in California. The drought was one of the main factors in the record-breaking 2008 California wildfire season. The Storm Prediction Center forecast that dry thunderstorms would be possible on June 20 and 21. However, the magnitude of the system was unclear, and thunderstorms swept through much of California with over 8,000 lightning strikes, causing a "fire siege" containing over 2,000 fires over the span of two days.

== Progression ==
The Iron Alps Complex was first reported on the morning of June 21, 2008. July 1, the fires had grown to over 19,000 acres. Five fires were still active; ten had been contained. A bulldozer rollover accident resulted in arm and shoulder injuries. (Note: The reason for the inconsistency in the numbers is that on July 4, the Buckhorn Fire was transferred to the Iron Complex.) By July 8, the complex had grown to nearly 29,000 acres, with six of the 16 fires still being active. On July 10, all remaining fires in the Alps Complex were transferred to the Iron Complex.

On July 23, communities along the Highway 299 corridor were put under an evacuation order. Two days later, a firefighter was killed by a falling tree. On August 5, the 2008 Carson Helicopters Iron 44 crash occurred when a helicopter crashed while carrying firefighters from a helispot on the Buckhorn Fire. On August 17, Big Bar was once again put under an evacuation order due to the spread of the Buckhorn Fire, one of the fires in the complex. The final containment report from CAL FIRE was released on September 4, with 98% containment, but in their final report of the fire, USFS has a containment date of September 5.

== Helicopter crash ==
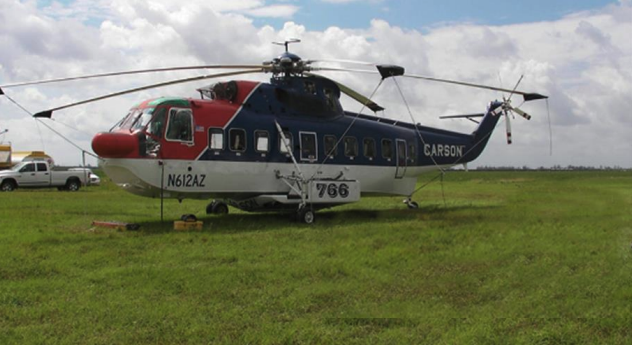
Image of the helicopter involved in the crash prior to the accident.

On August 5, a helicopter assigned to the Iron Complex fire crashed, killing 9 of the 13 people on board, including the pilot and eight firefighters. According to the National Transportation Safety Board, the accident was caused by Carson Helicopters engaging in the following three acts: "1) the intentional understatement of the helicopter’s empty weight, 2) the alteration of the power available chart to exaggerate the helicopter’s lift capability, and 3) the practice of using unapproved above-minimum specification torque in performance calculations that, collectively, resulted in the pilots relying on performance calculations that significantly overestimated the helicopter's load-carrying capacity and did not provide an adequate performance margin for a successful takeoff; and insufficient oversight by the United States Forest Service (USFS) and the Federal Aviation Administration (FAA)."

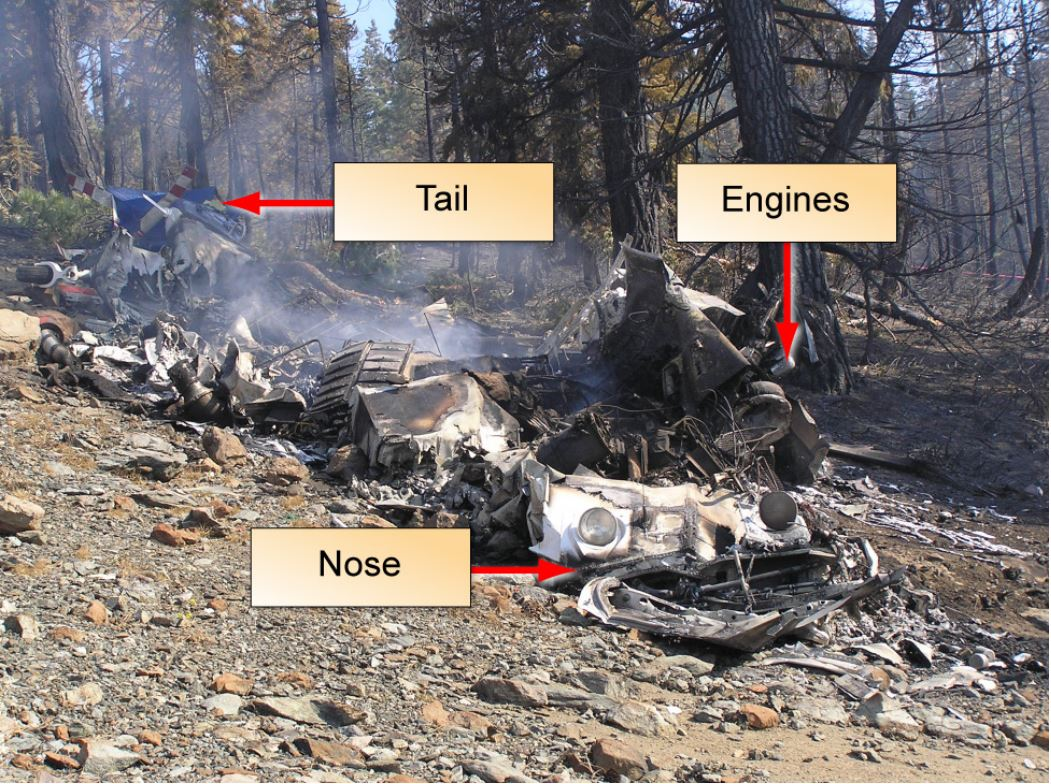
An image of the aftermath of the Iron 44 Helicopter Crash.

In 2012, a jury ordered that General Electric, the company which manufactured the motors, to pay nearly $70 million in total to the surviving pilot, his wife, and the estate of the pilot killed in the crash. In 2013, Levi Phillips, the former director of maintenance for Carson Helicopters, pled guilty, followed by the vice president of the company, Steven Metheny, in 2014. Phillips agreed to cooperate with authorities and was sentenced to 25 months in prison for a single charge of fraud, while Metheny was sentenced to 12.5 years in prison for conspiracy to commit fraud and defrauding the United States. A plea for Metheny's early release in 2020 citing his fear of contracting COVID-19 was rejected, but a second plea citing his deteriorating health was accepted in March 2021.

== Effects ==
The Iron Alps Complex's ten fatalities make it one of the deadliest wildfires in California history, landing at #12 on the list maintained by the California Department of Forestry and Fire Protection (Cal Fire). The fire destroyed or damaged a total of 2 or 10 structures. Suppression costs reached nearly $74 million ($108 million in 2025), with almost $72 million being from the Iron Complex.

== See also ==
- Glossary of wildfire terms
- 2002 United States airtanker crashes
- List of the deadliest firefighter disasters in the United States
