= Telegraph Fire (2008) =

2008 wildfire in Central California

- Part of the 2008 California wildfires
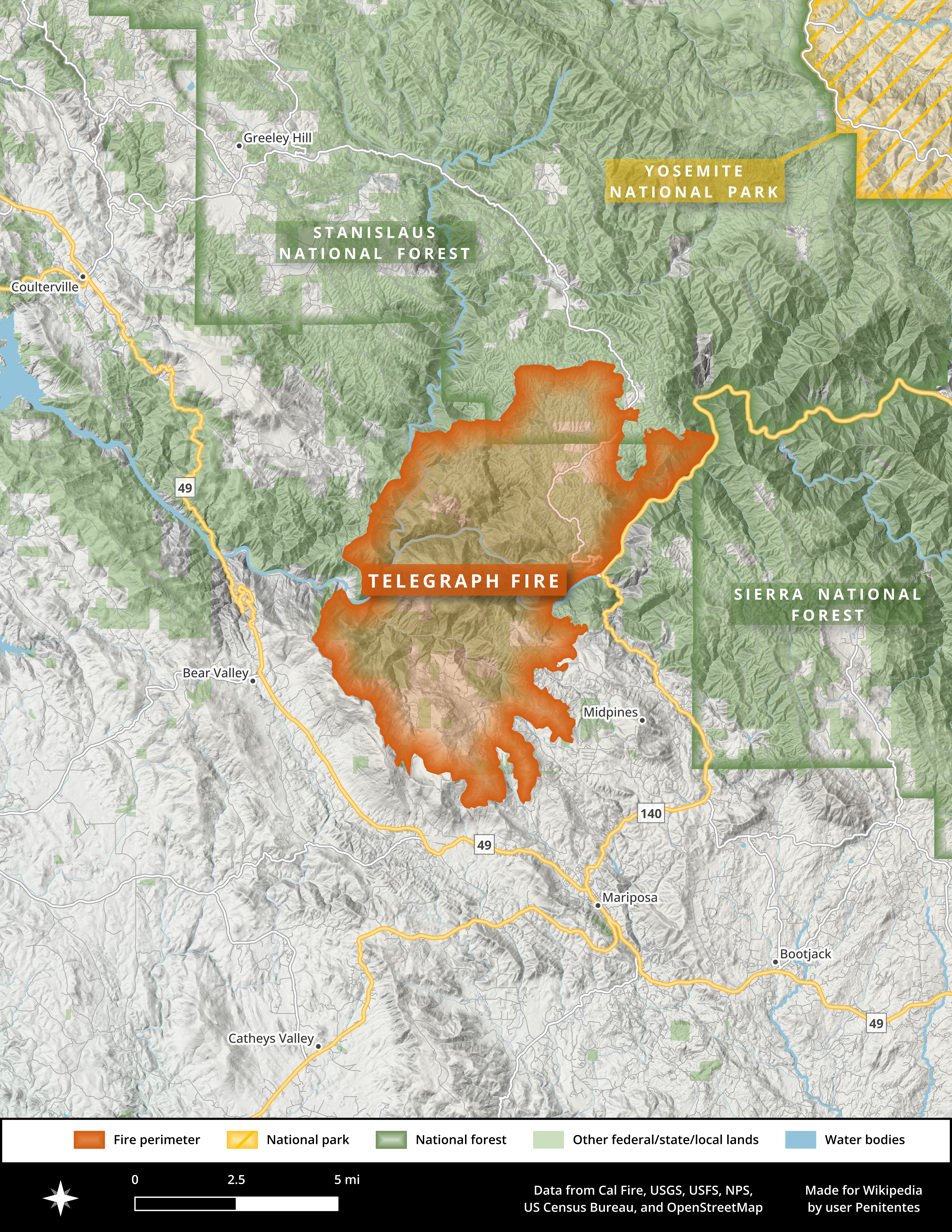
- The Telegraph Fire burned to the west of Yosemite National Park.
- Date: July 25 –; August 6, 2008; (13 days)
- Location: Mariposa County, Central California, United States
- Coordinates: 37.566°N 119.998°W

Statistics
- Burned area: 34,091 acres (13,796 ha; 53 sq mi; 138 km^{2})

Impacts
- Injuries: 38
- Evacuated: ~510 people
- Structures destroyed: ≥30
- Cost: $37.6 million; (equivalent to about $53.6 million in 2024)

Ignition
- Cause: Target shooting

Map
- The general location of the fire in Mariposa County, Central California

The Telegraph Fire was a destructive wildfire in Mariposa County, Central California, in the summer of 2008. After it was unintentionally ignited by a target shooter on July 25, the fire burned 34,091 acres (13,796 hectares) in the foothills of the Sierra Nevada west of Yosemite National Park before it was declared fully contained on August 6. The Telegraph Fire destroyed 20–30 homes and dozens of outbuildings and impacted tourism in the Yosemite Valley and adjacent areas. No fatalities occurred; dozens of firefighters sustained minor injuries during the fire suppression effort.

== Background ==
The Telegraph Fire was one of 6,255 wildfires which burned a total of 1,593,690 acres (644,940 ha) during California's 2008 wildfire season, more than double the five-year average of 757,986 acres (306,746 ha).

The Telegraph Fire burn area had seen no recorded wildfires in the roughly 100 years prior to the fire, which became a contributing factor to the fire's ferocity. The inaccessible terrain of the fire area also made the suppression effort difficult.

== Cause ==
The Telegraph Fire ignited at about 3:15 p.m. PDT on Friday, July 25, 2008. A local resident was plinking with two companions on BLM land in Sherlock Creek Canyon by its junction with the Merced River northeast of Mariposa, near the intersection of Sherlock Road and Telegraph Road. He used a .30-caliber rifle and steel-jacketed ammunition—banned in some areas for the fire hazard it can pose. During shooting, a bullet struck a rock and sparked the initial fire. The three people told investigators that they attempted to pour water on the fire, but were unsuccessful. The California Department of Forestry and Fire Protection (Cal Fire) declined to charge the man.

== Progression ==
Over the course of twelve hours on July 26, the fire expanded from about 1,000 acres (400 ha) to about 16,000 acres (6,500 ha), and fire activity remained heightened the following day as flame lengths reportedly reached 100 feet (30 m). By the night of July 28 the fire had burned about 27,000 acres (11,000 ha) and was 10 percent contained.

On August 1, the Mariposa County Board of Supervisors declared a state of emergency in order to better access federal aid.

The Telegraph Fire was declared 100 percent contained on Wednesday, August 6. The cost of containing the fire amounted to $37.6 million in 2008 USD, roughly equivalent to $53.6 million in 2024.

== Effects ==
Cal Fire reported that at least 38 injuries to firefighting personnel and civilians occurred; at least 22 of the injuries were minor and suffered by firefighters during the suppression effort.

In addition to the $37.6 million in fire suppression costs, the Telegraph Fire resulted in "millions of dollars" of damage to property. This included at least 21 homes, or according to other reports as many as 30. Another 75 outbuildings were reportedly destroyed. Cal Fire records the total structural toll as 30 structures destroyed and 100 damaged.

The number of evacuees at one point reached about 500. At least 350 homes lay in mandatory evacuation zones in Midpines and Coultersville. All residents were able to return to their homes by August 1.

The fire also forced the closure of a 10-mile (16 km) stretch of California State Route 140, from a point three miles (4.8 km) west of Briceburg to a point four miles (6.4 km) west of El Portal between July 29 and July 30.

Fire suppression operations required Pacific Gas & Electric Company (PG&E) to shut down transmission lines supplying electricity to the community of El Portal as well as Yosemite Valley in Yosemite National Park. Amenities within the park (such as lodges, stores, and restaurants) largely remained open, relying on generators. The fire negatively impacted air quality and visibility within the park.

== See also ==
- Glossary of wildfire terms
- List of California wildfires
