= 2008 California wildfires =

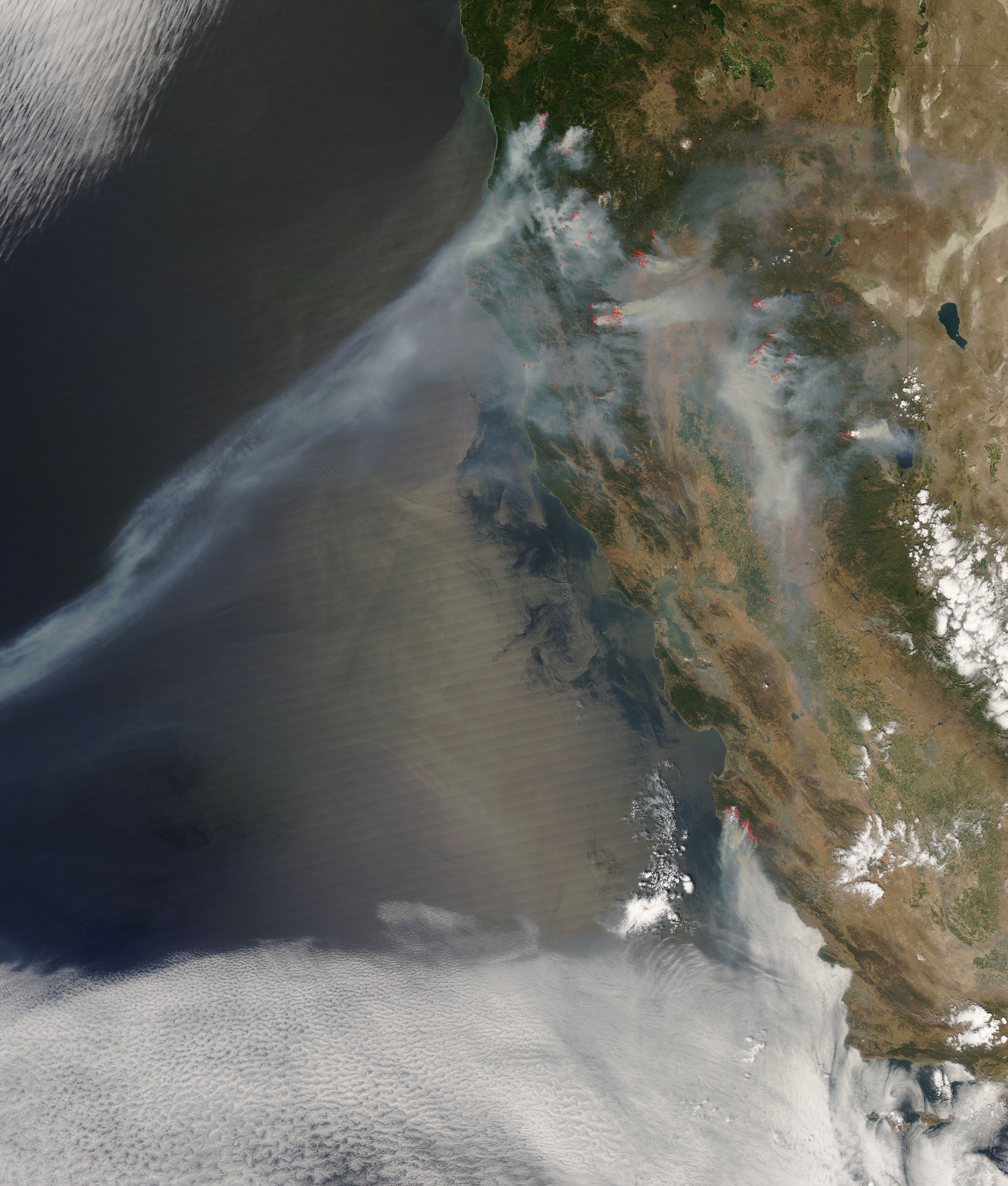
- Some of the wildfires as seen from space during the height of the summer outbreak on July 9, 2008.

Statistics
- Total fires: 6,255
- Total area: 1,593,690 acres (6,449.4 km^{2})

Impacts
- Deaths: 32 (13 firefighters)
- Injuries: At least 93
- Cost: Over $651.5 million (2008 USD)

The 2008 wildfire season was one of California's most devastating in the 21st century. While 6,255 fires occurred, about two-thirds as many as in 2007, the total area burned— 1,593,690 acres (6,449.4 square kilometres)—far exceeded that of previous years.

By July 5, 2008, 328 wildfires were burning, and those fires were only 81% contained. For the first time since 1977, the US military helped with ground-based firefighting, when Governor Arnold Schwarzenegger dispatched 400 California National Guard troops, including Chief Medical Officer Susan Pangelinan, to manage fire lines. He said the number of fires had stretched the state's fire-fighting resources thin. "One never has resources for 1,700 fires. Who has the resources for that?" Schwarzenegger said, adding, "Something is happening, clearly. There's more need for resources than ever before... it's fire season all year round."

== Background ==
The timing of "fire season" in California is variable, depending on the amount of prior winter and spring precipitation, the frequency and severity of weather such as heat waves and wind events, and moisture content in vegetation. Northern California typically sees wildfire activity between late spring and early fall, peaking in the summer with hotter and drier conditions. Occasional cold frontal passages can bring wind and lightning. The timing of fire season in Southern California is similar, peaking between late spring and fall. The severity and duration of peak activity in either part of the state is modulated in part by weather events: downslope/offshore wind events can lead to critical fire weather, while onshore flow and Pacific weather systems can bring conditions that hamper wildfire growth.

== List of wildfires ==
Below is a list of all fires that exceeded 1,000 acres (400 ha) during the 2008 fire season. The list is taken from CAL FIRE's list of large fires.

Name	County	Acres	Km^{2}	Start Date	Contained Date (Note: Containment means that fire crews have established and secured control lines around the fire's perimeter. These lines are artificial barriers, like trenches or cleared vegetation, designed to stop the fire's spread, or natural barriers like rivers. Containment reflects progress in managing the fire but does not necessarily mean the fire is starved of fuel, under control, or put out.)	Notes
Wawona Nw	Mariposa	1,130	4.6	April 9, 2008	April 19, 2008	
Honey Bee	Tulare	1,225	5.0	May 6, 2008	May 23, 2008	
Colyear	Tehama	1,331	5.4	May 6, 2008	May 9, 2008	
Avocado	Fresno	1,100	4.5	May 20, 2008	May 21, 2008	
Summit	Santa Cruz	4,270	17.3	May 22, 2008	May 27, 2008	
Clover	Tulare	15,300	61.9	May 28, 2008	July 20, 2008	
Indians	Monterey	81,378	329.3	June 8, 2008	July 10, 2008	
Jackson	Sacramento	6,400	25.9	June 10, 2008	June 12, 2008	
Ophir	Butte	1,600	6.5	June 10, 2008	June 13, 2008	
41	Madera	3,300	13.4	June 10, 2008	June 11, 2008	
Lagrange	Tuolumne	1,346	5.4	June 10, 2008	June 11, 2008	
Humboldt	Butte	23,344	94.5	June 11, 2008	June 21, 2008	
Whiskey	Tehama	7,783	31.5	June 12, 2008	June 22, 2008	
Albion River Lightning	Mendocino	1,000	4.0	June 20, 2008	June 30, 2008	
Lime Complex	Trinity	98,715	399.5	June 20, 2008	August 15, 2008	
Mad Complex	Trinity	3,705	15.0	June 20, 2008	July 21, 2008	
Hells Half Complex	Trinity	15,146	61.3	June 20, 2008	July 28, 2008	
South Complex	Humboldt	29,327	118.7	June 20, 2008	September 15, 2008	
Brown Complex	San Benito	3,870	15.7	June 21, 2008	June 24, 2008	
West Branch	Butte	3,206	13.0	June 21, 2008	June 21, 2008	
Frey	Butte	10,000	40.5	June 21, 2008	June 21, 2008	
Flea Valley	Butte	1,248	5.1	June 21, 2008	June 21, 2008	
Flea Valley 2	Butte	1,248	5.1	June 21, 2008	June 21, 2008	
Paradise	Humboldt	1,076	4.4	June 21, 2008	August 1, 2008	
Blue 2 Complex	Siskiyou	82,186	332.6	June 20, 2008	Merged into the Klamath Theater Complex Fire	
Popcorn	Lassen	3,000	12.1	June 21, 2008	June 22, 2008	
Cub Complex	Lassen	19,718	79.8	June 21, 2008	July 20, 2008	
Peterson Complex	Lassen	7,842	31.7	June 21, 2008	July 2, 2008	
Wild	Napa	4,200	17.0	June 21, 2008	June 26, 2008	
Basin Complex	Monterey	162,818	658.9	June 21, 2008	July 27, 2008	
Wagers Lightning	Mendocino	3,000	12.1	June 21, 2008	June 21, 2008	
Jack Smith Lightning	Mendocino	3,000	12.1	June 21, 2008	July 13, 2008	
Mallo B	Mendocino	4,466	18.1	June 21, 2008	July 17, 2008	
Squaw 1 Lightning 2	Mendocino	3,000	12.1	June 21, 2008	July 13, 2008	
Red Mountain 1	Mendocino	7,515	30.4	June 21, 2008	August 1, 2008	
Gate Lightning	Mendocino	3,000	12.1	June 21, 2008	July 13, 2008	
Soda Complex	Lake	8,632	34.9	June 21, 2008	July 26, 2008	
Canyon Complex	Plumas	47,680	193.0	June 21, 2008	September 30, 2008	
Iron Alps Complex	Trinity	105,805	428.2	June 21, 2008	September 9, 2008	10 fatalities
Sta 57 Ono Cdf Igo 2	Shasta	4,000	16.2	June 21, 2008	July 24, 2008	
Whitmore Old Crow C2	Shasta	2,054	8.3	June 21, 2008	July 15, 2008	
EO2A	Shasta	1,200	4.9	June 21, 2008	July 6, 2008	
Stein	Shasta	1,148	4.6	June 21, 2008	July 7, 2008	
Moon	Shasta	6,030	24.4	June 21, 2008	August 9, 2008	
Platina 4	Trinity	12,980	52.5	June 21, 2008	July 4, 2008	
Lewiston 8	Trinity	1,311	5.3	June 21, 2008	July 23, 2008	
Lakehead	Shasta	27,936	113.1	June 21, 2008	August 23, 2008	
Oliver	Mariposa	2,200	8.9	June 21, 2008	June 26, 2008	
North Mountain	Tuolumne	2,889	11.7	June 21, 2008	July 3, 2008	
American River Complex	Placer	20,541	83.1	June 21, 2008	July 30, 2008	
Yuba River Complex	Sierra	4,254	17.2	June 21, 2008	July 15, 2008	
Whiskeytown Complex	Shasta	6,420	26.0	June 21, 2008	July 19, 2008	
Klamath Theater Complex	Siskiyou	192,038	777.2	June 21, 2008	September 30, 2008	2 firefighters killed.
Popcorn	Lassen	3,000	12.1	June 22, 2008	July 8, 2008	
Mill Complex	Tehama	2,100	8.5	June 22, 2008	June 29, 2008	
Walker	Lake	15,000	60.7	June 22, 2008	June 29, 2008	
Orr Springs Rd Ukv 2	Mendocino	3,000	12.1	June 22, 2008	July 10, 2008	
5-8 Cliff Lightning	Mendocino	1,000	4.0	June 22, 2008	July 13, 2008	
Venture	Shasta	1,912	7.7	June 22, 2008	July 4, 2008	
Corral	Lassen	12,500	50.6	June 23, 2008	July 7, 2008	
Oliver	Mariposa	2,789	11.3	June 23, 2008	July 6, 2008	
Mill Creek	Tehama	13,580	55.0	June 24, 2008	July 1, 2008	
Piute	Kern	37,026	149.8	June 28, 2008	July 25, 2008	
Hardy	Mendocino	5,581	22.6	June 30, 2008	June 30, 2008	
Gap	Santa Barbara	9,443	38.2	July 1, 2008	July 28, 2008	
Butch Lightning	Mendocino	2,800	11.3	July 4, 2008	July 4, 2008	
Lost Pipe Lightning	Mendocino	1,200	4.9	July 4, 2008	July 10, 2008	
Jack Smith Lightning	Mendocino	2,000	8.1	July 4, 2008	July 15, 2008	
Albion Lightning	Mendocino	3,000	12.1	July 4, 2008	July 8, 2008	
Horse Lightning	Mendocino	1,000	4.0	July 4, 2008	July 8, 2008	
Orr Series Lightning	Mendocino	3,000	12.1	July 4, 2008	July 13, 2008	
Montgomery Flat Lightning	Mendocino	3,000	12.1	July 4, 2008	July 15, 2008	
Alder Creek Beach	Mendocino	1,000	4.0	July 7, 2008	July 7, 2008	
Tehipite	Fresno	11,596	46.9	July 19, 2008	November 11, 2008	
Panther	Siskiyou	72,344	292.8	July 24, 2008	September 30, 2008	
Telegraph	Mariposa	34,091	138.0	July 25, 2008	September 15, 2008	
Rich	Plumas	6,112	24.7	July 29, 2008	August 10, 2008	
Craig	Butte	2,001	8.1	August 3, 2008	August 11, 2008	
Rim	Butte	1,651	6.7	August 13, 2008	August 13, 2008	
Empire	Butte	2,000	8.1	August 13, 2008	August 13, 2008	
Camp Beldon and Pit	Butte	47,647	192.8	July 8, 2008	August 13, 2008	
Smokey	Butte	1,324	5.4	August 13, 2008	August 13, 2008	
Jack	Siskiyou	6,900	27.9	August 17, 2008	August 22, 2008	
Gladding	Placer	1,000	4.0	September 1, 2008	September 3, 2008	
Gulch	Shasta	2,847	11.5	September 7, 2008	September 11, 2008	
Hidden	Tulare	3,668	14.8	September 10, 2008	September 30, 2008	
Chalk	Monterey	16,269	65.8	September 25, 2008	October 29, 2008	
November	San Diego	1,400	5.7	October 8, 2008	October 9, 2008	
Marek	Los Angeles	4,824	19.5	October 12, 2008	October 16, 2008	
Sesnon	Los Angeles	14,703	59.5	October 13, 2008	October 18, 2008	
Juliett	San Diego	4,026	16.3	October 13, 2008	October 17, 2008	
Lackerman	Butte	1,310	5.3	October 23, 2008	October 23, 2008	
Tea	Santa Barbara	1,940	7.9	November 13, 2008	November 17, 2008	
Sayre	Los Angeles	11,200	45.3	November 14, 2008	November 20, 2008	
Freeway Complex	Riverside	30,305	122.6	November 15, 2008	November 22, 2008	

== Summer fires ==
The Summer 2008 fires were a concentrated outbreak of wildfires during the late spring and summer of 2008. Over 3,596 individual fires were burning at the height of the period, burning large portions of forests and chaparral in California, injuring at least 34 individuals and killing 32. The majority of the fires were started by lightning from dry thunderstorms on June 20, although some earlier fires ignited during mid-May. International aid from Greece, Cyprus, Chile, Argentina, Brazil, Australia, Canada, Mexico, and New Zealand helped fight the fires.

The first of the wildfires was the Big Horn Fire, which ignited on May 13. Three other minor wildfires ignited subsequently, but were extinguished by May 17. On May 20, the Avocado Fire ignited in Fresno County, only to be extinguished 2 days later. On May 22, 2008, the human-caused Summit Fire broke out in the Santa Cruz Mountains, which became the first major fire.

On July 5, 2008, California Governor Schwarzenegger commented that "I've been driving up and down the state of California going to all the various fires, and you can imagine, this state is very prepared for fire, but when you wake up one morning and have 500 fires across the state, it was a real shock to me... only to find the next morning there were 1,000 fires, and the next morning 1,400 fires, and then 1,700 fires igniting over 14 days."

The Gap Fire near Goleta in Santa Barbara County burned 8,357 acres (3,382 hectares). The fire was contained on July 29, after several weeks of activity.

By July 11, 2008, it was reported that a total of 793,483 acres (321,111 hectares) was burned, a total exceeding the initial estimate of 510,000 acres (210,000 hectares) burned by the October 2007 California wildfires. On July 12, 2008, the area burned reached 801,726 acres (324,447 hectares), exceeding the estimated 800,000 acres (320,000 hectares) burned by the 2003 California wildfires, making the Summer 2008 wildfires the greatest wildfire event in Californian history, in terms of burned area. On that date 20,274 personnel had been committed to fight the fires. Total resources included 467 hand crews, 1,503 engines, 423 water tenders, 291 bulldozers, 142 helicopters, 400 soldiers and numerous air tankers. The fire was responsible for the deaths of 23 individuals.

On July 25, a blaze sparked by target shooting broke out in Mariposa County, in the Sierra Nevada foothills of central California. By the following day, the Telegraph Fire had gone from 1,000 to 16,000 acres (400 to 6,470 hectares), and within days had destroyed 21 homes in the community of Midpines. Residents were evacuated from approximately 300 homes that were immediately threatened, with an additional 4,000 homes placed on standby for evacuation in Midpines, Greeley Hill, and Coulterville.

During August, wildfire activity began to diminish, although there were still hundreds of wildfires still burning. On August 29, wildfire activity had largely ended, although three more wildfires ignited after September 1, beginning with the Gladding Fire. On September 10, the Colony Fire was 100% contained, ending the last of the Summer 2008 California wildfires. The Summer 2008 wildfires burned a total of 1,162,197 acres (4,703.24 km^{2}) between May 2008 and September 2008, comprising the vast majority of burned land by wildfires in California in 2008.

In total, the Summer 2008 wildfires burned a total of 1,161,197 acres (469,920 ha), which accounts for 84% of the total area burned during the 2008 wildfire season. In addition, the Summer 2008 fires cost over $92.38 million (2008 USD) to fight.

The Basin Complex Fire in the Ventana Wilderness became the third largest wildfire in California's history based on size (until it was surpassed in size by the 2013 Rim Fire), and also the second-costliest wildfire to extinguish in U.S. history.

=== Weather ===
The fires broke out after three years of below-normal rainfall dehydrated much of California's forests and woodlands, making them prone to wildfires. Spring 2008 for California was the driest on record for many locations; for example, San Francisco registered only 0.67 inches (17 mm) of rain out of a normal of 5.18 inches (13 cm) from March to May. As vegetation turned into bone-dry tinder in early June, Governor Arnold Schwarzenegger declared a statewide drought for the first time in 17 years. Dry thunderstorms and lightning, rarely seen on the California coastline in June, rolled onshore on the weekend of June 20–21. The storm unleashed 25,000 to 26,000 dry lightning strikes across Northern and Central California, igniting more than 2,000 fires. The number of wildfires skyrocketed in the days after the thunderstorms and high daily daytime temperatures of over 120 °F (49 °C) dramatically increased the various fires' growth. The same thunderstorms also caused fires in Oregon.

A heat wave commenced on July 7, with temperatures in inland locations, such as the Central Valley soaring above 115 °F (46 °C). Lake Berryessa recorded a high temperature of 126 °F (52 °C), prompting weather agencies like the National Weather Service to issue high fire danger warnings. These near to record-breaking temperatures concerned many firefighters, who feared that the high heat, low humidity, and high-elevation winds could make firefighting more strenuous.

=== Contributing factors ===
John Juskie, a National Weather Service science officer, was quoted in June 2008 in the Los Angeles Times stating "in historic terms, we're at record dry levels." The spring of 2008 not only broke the record for least inches of rainfall, at 0.17 of an inch, it represented less than one-third of the previous record low of 0.55 of an inch of rainfall in 1934.

A record lack of rainfall, severely dry vegetation and uncharacteristically windy weather combined to create tinderbox conditions across Northern California. In most areas of Northern California, the grasses and brush were as dry in June as they normally would be in October. Moisture content was less than 2%, compared with about 40% normally for this time of year, fire officials stated. In addition, "no one has seen a springtime like this with the winds," Juskie said.

== Smoke and air quality ==
Air quality in northern and central California deteriorated as a result of smoke from the wildfires, especially in the Central Valley from Bakersfield in the southern San Joaquin Valley section to Redding in the northern Sacramento Valley section.

=== Northern California ===
From June 21 to June 27, much of Northern California was covered in a thick blanket of smoke, which reduced visibility and turned the sky yellow and the Moon red.

Some areas endured record levels of air pollution, along with hazardous concentrations of particulate matter. These smoky and hazy conditions prompted health officials to issue air quality advisories and warnings, as particulate matter reached unhealthy levels in the North Bay on June 25. In the San Francisco Bay Area, the Bay Area Air Quality Management District urged the elderly and people with respiratory problems to stay indoors. In spite of the warnings, health officials noted a jump in the number of people with eye and throat irritation. The bad air quality also forced the cancellation of the 100-mile (161 km) Western States Endurance Run, the first in the race's 31-year history. Air quality began to improve on June 28, followed by decreased smoke and improved visibility a day later. By June 30, residents in the Sacramento Valley saw blue skies and good air quality, as a result of onshore winds and the Delta breezes.

However, air quality in Oregon degraded as plumes of smoke drifted northward instead of concentrating in the Central Valley.

=== Spare the Air ===
Hazy conditions returned on July 7, along with high temperatures over 100 °F (38 °C) in the Central Valley. The heat and smoke combined forced public health officials and Gov. Arnold Schwarzenegger to issue "Spare the Air" advisories and an emergency plan for heat waves, respectively. Air quality districts issued another Spare the Air day for July 8, July 9, and July 10, as calm wind conditions in Northern California failed to blow away the smoke from the wildfires. Smoky conditions continued into late August, when most of the wildfires were extinguished. The smoke from the fires finally began to disperse on September 10, after the last of the wildfires was fully contained.

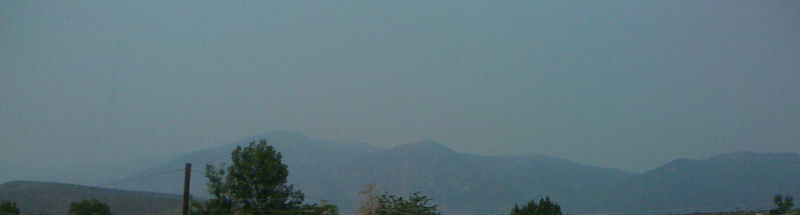
View east of the smokey sky, from Carson City, Nevada (11 July 2008).

=== Health Impact ===
A paper in the American Journal of Respiratory Cell and Molecular Biology studied a group of adolescent rhesus macaque monkeys that were exposed during infancy to smoke from northern California wildfires in 2008. They found that monkeys exposed to wildfire smoke as infants had "significantly reduced inspiratory capacity, residual volume, vital capacity, and functional residual capacity per unit of body weight." There was also a trend of reduced total lung capacity in animals exposed to wildfire smoke as infants. Adolescent monkeys exposed to wildfire smoke as infants were also found to have a lessened PBMCs responses to TLR Ligands. TLR5 has been linked with the asthma phenotype experimentally and in human subjects. An important finding in the study was that monkeys over 200 miles away from the combustion were still found to have significant immune and respiratory changes.

The findings were consistent with many other human group studies and suggest that children who underwent the same experience as the monkeys in the study have a high chance of exhibiting similar health problems but, that because normal development of rhesus monkeys is accelerated compared to human children the relative impact of this amount of wildfire smoke exposure might differ.

== November Fires ==
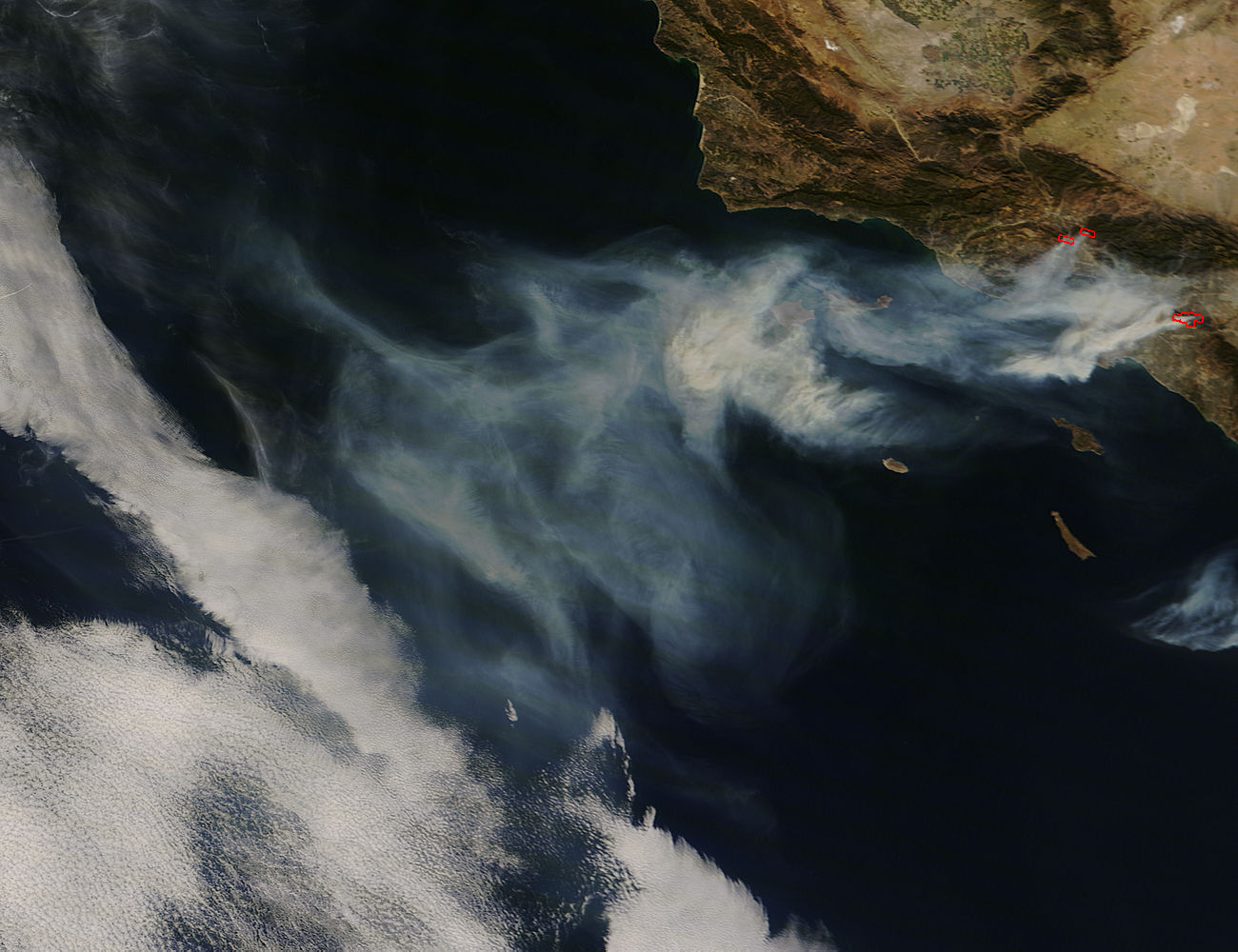
Smoke and highlighted burn areas imaged on November 16 by the Terra Earth observation satellite.

The month of November saw a large number of fires, around 2,151, which began burning across Southern California on November 13, with 4 of them becoming major wildfires. At least 400 houses and 500 mobile homes were destroyed. According to USA Today, these wildfires combined with those from October 2007 and the Summer of 2008 were the worst group of wildfires that California had experienced in two decades.

Los Angeles Mayor Antonio Villaraigosa told residents, "If you wait until the fire gets there you have waited too long, this fire can be on you in a moment's notice." California Governor Arnold Schwarzenegger declared a state of emergency in Santa Barbara, Los Angeles, and Orange Counties. Governor Schwarzenegger described the conditions contributing to the fires as a "perfect storm," including strong Santa Ana and sundowner winds, with gusts reaching 80 miles per hour (129 km/h), as well as high temperatures, low humidity, and dry conditions.

The most significant fires were the following:

- Montecito Tea Fire - a wildfire that started on November 13, 2008, in the wealthy community of Montecito, in Santa Barbara County, California, resulting in the destruction of 210 homes. Many celebrities have homes in the area of the Tea Fire, including Oprah Winfrey, Rob Lowe, and Steven Spielberg. The home of actor Christopher Lloyd was destroyed in the fire.
- Sayre Fire - a wildfire that started on November 13, 2008, in the Sylmar section of Los Angeles, California, resulting in the destruction of at least 630 structures, including 500 mobile homes, nine single-family homes, and eleven commercial buildings. The loss of more than 500 residences is the "worst loss of homes due to fire" ever in the City of Los Angeles, California, exceeding the loss of 484 residences in the 1961 Bel Air fire.
- Freeway Complex Fire - The combination of 2 wildfires, one of which was known as the Corona Fire by the news media, or Triangle Complex Fire, that started at approximately 9:00 a.m. PDT on November 15, 2008, and spread across the communities of Corona, Chino Hills, Yorba Linda, Anaheim Hills and Brea in Orange and Riverside County, California, and also spread to Diamond Bar in Los Angeles County. Later on November 15, the Landfill Fire ignited at 10:45 AM, and early on May 16, both wildfires merged into the Freeway Complex Fire. The Freeway Complex Fire burned about 30,305 acres (12,264 ha), injured 14 firefighters, and destroyed about 200 structures, and forced the evacuations of about 7,000 homes.

== Fatalities ==
During the season, the National Interagency Fire Center reported 13 firefighter fatalities while battling wildfires. Nine were killed in a helicopter crash, while others died of a heart attack, a falling tree, and an entrapment. In all, 32 people were killed by the wildfires.

== See also ==
- October 2007 California wildfires
- 2017 California wildfires
  - October 2017 Northern California wildfires
- Rush Fire
- List of California wildfires
