= Basin Complex Fire =

2008 wildfire in Southern California

- Part of the 2008 California wildfires
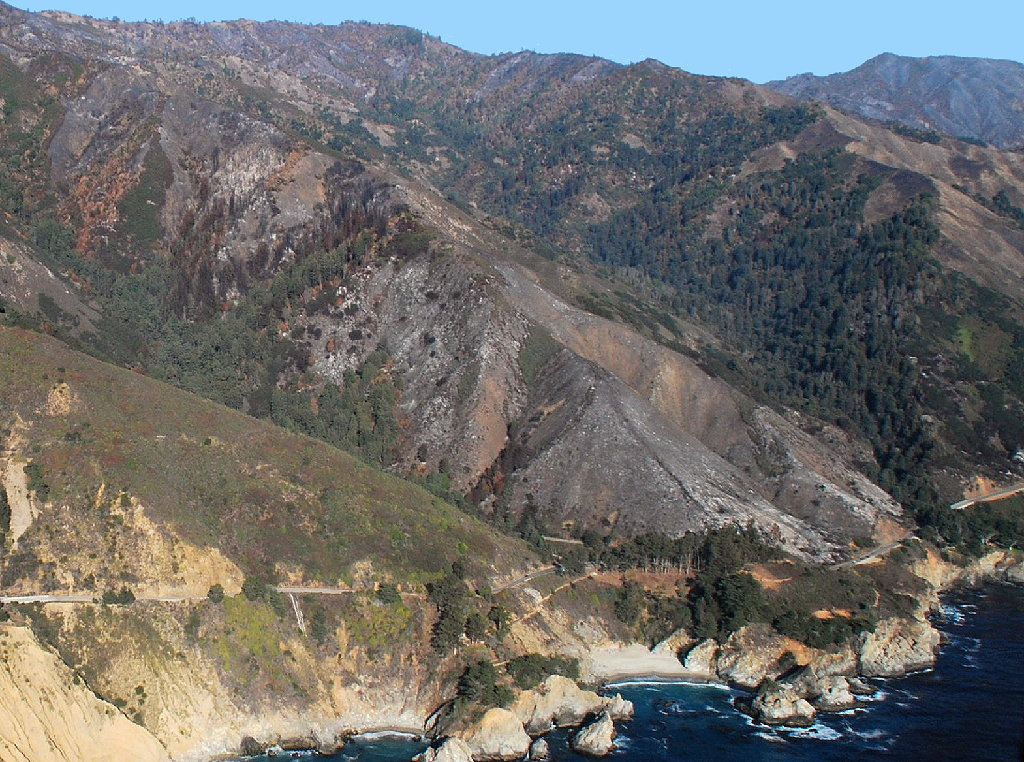
- Aerial view of Basin Fire Burn Area at Julia Pfeiffer Burns Park, on September 1.
- Date: June 21, 2008 –; July 27, 2008
- Location: Monterey County, California

Statistics
- Burned area: 162,818 acres (659 km^{2})

Impacts
- Deaths: None reported
- Injuries: None reported
- Cost: $120 million (2008 USD)

Ignition
- Cause: Lightning

The Basin Complex Fire was a massive wildfire near Big Sur that ignited on June 21, 2008, and was the result of a lightning strike. It eventually grew to 162,818 acres (658.90 km^{2}), becoming the second-largest wildfire of the 2008 California wildfire season and burning most of the Ventana Wilderness. State and federal officials spent more than $120 million to fight the fire, making it the most expensive fire in California history up to that point and the second most expensive in U.S. history, exceeded only by the Biscuit Fire in 2002. Eventually, the Thomas Fire surpassed the Basin Complex Fire in firefighting costs as well.

== The fire ==
The wildfire forced the evacuation of Big Sur prior to the July 4 holiday weekend. Camp Pico Blanco was forced to evacuate the camp and diverted its Scouts to Boulder Creek Scout Reservation in Santa Cruz. The camp lost only one building, an outlying ranger's cabin. Big Sur residents were permitted to return on July 9.

As of 2021, the fire is the 20th largest wildfire in California, since accurate records began in 1932.

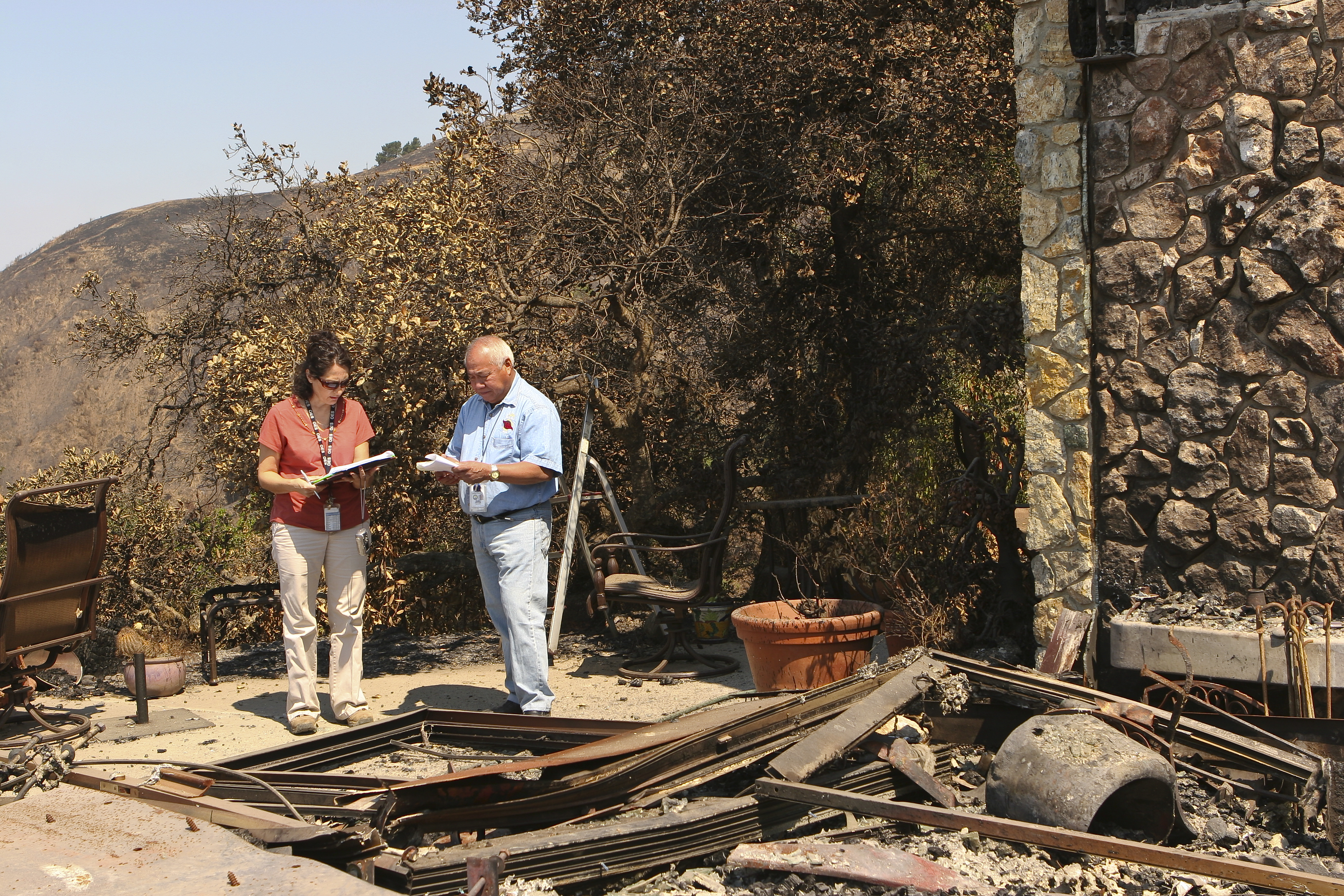
A house burnt down in the Basin Fire, 2008
