= Tea Fire =

2008 wildfire in Southern California

Coordinates: 34.4574°N 119.6566°W

- Part of the 2008 California wildfires
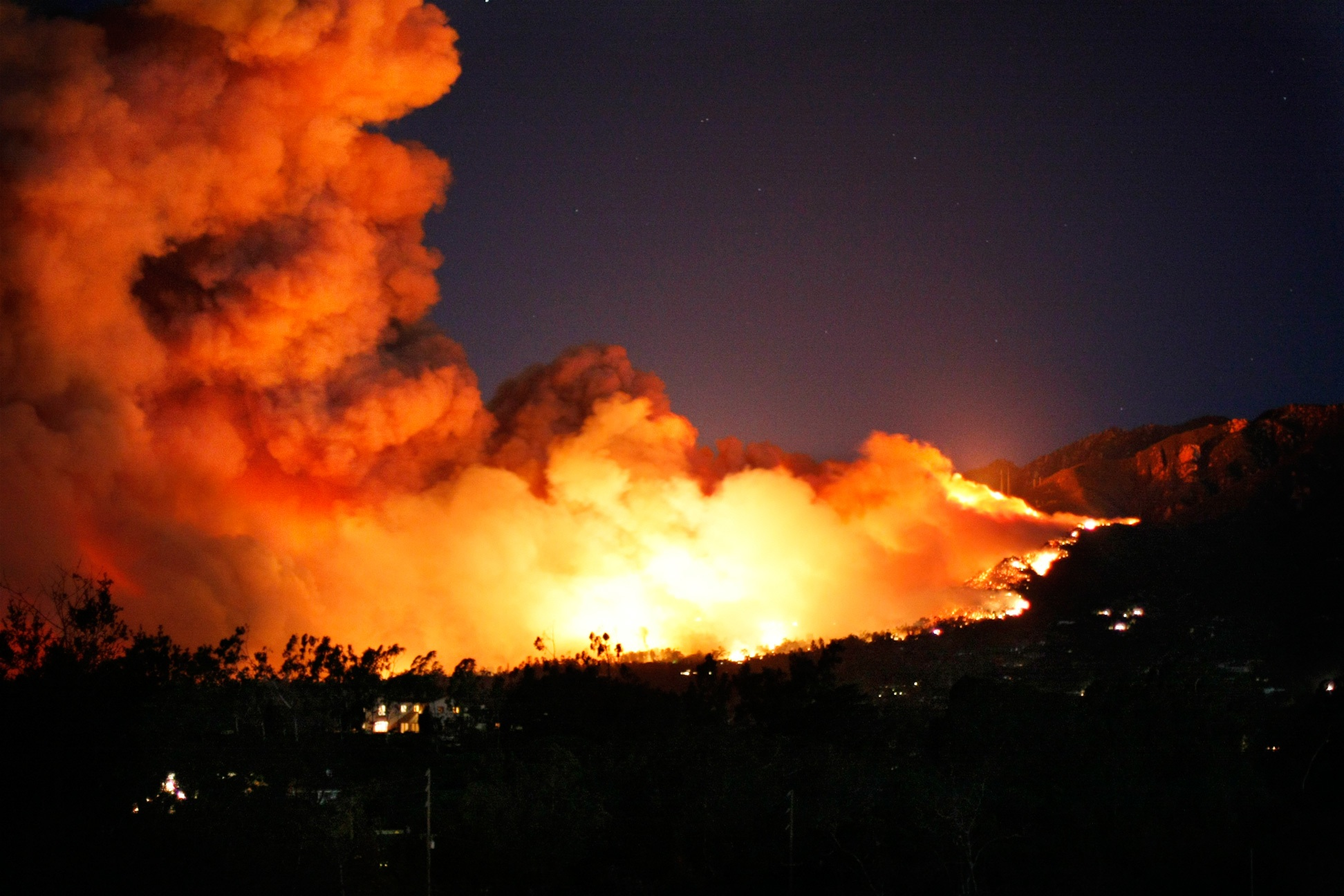
- Date: November 13, 2008 –; November 17, 2008
- Location: Montecito, California, United States

Statistics
- Burned area: 1,940 acres (785 ha)
- Land use: Residential; Open space

Impacts
- Deaths: Potentially 1
- Injuries: 13
- Cost: $5.7 million (2008 USD)

Ignition
- Perpetrator: 10 college students
- Motive: Bonfire party

The Tea Fire, also known as the Montecito Tea Fire, was a wildfire that began on November 13, 2008, destroying 210 homes in the cities of Montecito and Santa Barbara, California, in the United States of America. It was the first of several November 2008 wildfires that burned hundreds of homes from November 13–15, 2008. The Tea Fire ignited in the Cold Springs section of Montecito at approximately 17:50 PST on November 13, 2008. The fire started at a Mar Y Cel historic structure called the "Tea House" above Mountain Drive, giving the fire its name. Spreading rapidly, it was fanned by offshore winds, known as Sundowner winds, that blow down the Santa Ynez Mountains, gusting up to 85 mph (137 km/h). These winds caused the fire to spread into the city of Santa Barbara. The fire was 40% contained on the 15th, 75% on the 16th, and by November 17, 2008, it was 95% contained after burning 1,940 acres (785 ha), and on November 18, it was 100% contained.

On November 15, 2008, Governor Arnold Schwarzenegger visited areas burned in the Tea Fire, noting: "When you walk around the area that was destroyed, it looks like hell."

== Cause ==
The cause of the fire was under investigation for the first four days when authorities determined on November 17 that it was "human-caused". The following day, Santa Barbara County Sheriff's Office investigators announced that the fire was caused by a group of ten men and women, age 18 to 22, college students, who went to the abandoned Tea House on the night of Wednesday, November 12, and held a bonfire party at the location, through the early morning hours of Thursday, November 13. The students told investigators they had put the fire out, but authorities believe the fire smoldered until the heavy winds ignited the fire on Thursday afternoon. One of the students was Joshua Decker, who was featured in Season 4 of the Paramount+ show Couples Therapy and discussed the fire in a therapy session.

On November 20, 2008, Dr. Andreea M. Serban, President of Santa Barbara City College, issued a statement noting that "nine of the ten individuals identified as allegedly responsible for the Tea Fire have been confirmed as Santa Barbara City College students." That same day, Dr. Gayle Beebe, president of Westmont College, noted in a press release the college's relief to learn that none of the ten was enrolled at Westmont.

Although the individuals were found guilty of trespassing and holding an illegal bonfire, the DA's office felt there was not enough evidence to convict them of starting the blaze. "After a months-long investigation by several agencies, the District Attorney’s Office decided it could only charge the group with the misdemeanor crimes, the DA felt as though she would be unable to prove beyond a reasonable doubt that the campfire they had started — and, according to group members, extinguished — more than 12 hours earlier had led to the Tea Fire."

== Impact ==
=== Injuries and evacuations ===
Santa Barbara County officials stated that they had reports of 13 persons injured, including 10 who were treated for smoke inhalation and three with burn injuries, one of whom was critical. There is a foundation for two burn victims of the fire, Lance & Carla Hoffman. Information on this foundation including benefits and donations can be found on Facebook's group "Tea Fire Survivors: Lance and Karla Hoffman". The fire resulted in the evacuation of 5,400 homes with 15,000 residents. Approximately 2,700 evacuees were back home by November 16, 2008. There was one fatality amongst the evacuees, a 98-year-old man, though the county sheriff-coroner had not ascertained yet if the death was due to the fire or his many medical problems.

=== Destruction of 210 homes ===
"My wife called and said 'Montecito is on fire — get out'. And I thought she was kidding. We got in the car, pulled out of the driveway and the entire mountain behind was flames 200 feet high — shooting into the air. Embers were raining down, they were in our shirts and in our hair, and the wind was easily 70 mile per hour ... it was an Armageddon!" (Rob Lowe, November 14, 2008)

—

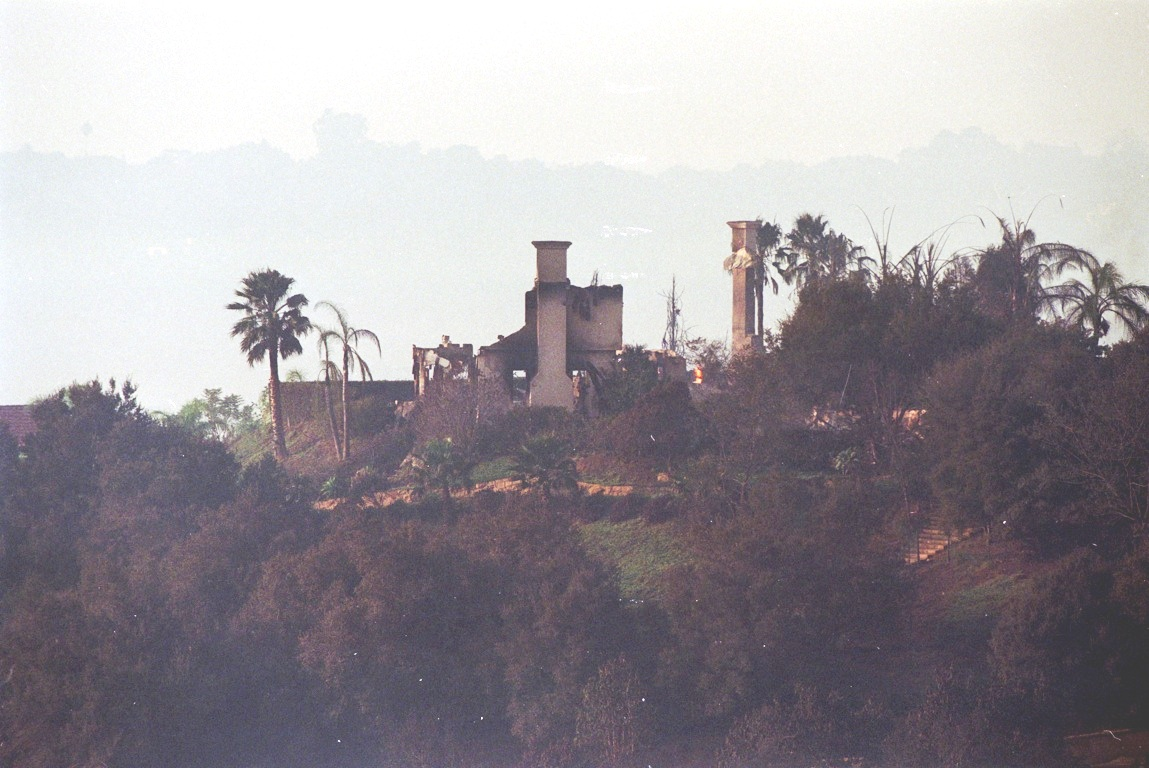
House on Mountain Drive destroyed in the fire

The Tea Fire resulted in the destruction of 210 homes in Montecito and Santa Barbara. Of the destroyed homes, 106 were in the city of Santa Barbara, and the remainder were in Montecito. One of the homes destroyed in the fire belonged to actor Christopher Lloyd (best known for playing "Doc" Brown in the Back to the Future trilogy).

=== Westmont College ===
The campus of Westmont College was heavily damaged, though no injuries were reported on the campus. The college's planning for a shelter-in-place was credited with this favorable human outcome. 800 people (students, employees, visitors and neighbors) hunkered down in the gymnasium as the fire burned to within ten feet. The Physics Lab, Psychology Building, Math Building, and 15 of the faculty homes were destroyed. Two of the residence hall buildings in Clark residence hall were completely gutted, along with the RD cottage. With the recovery phase initiated over the weekend, faculty and staff were allowed back on campus November 17, but the school was scheduled to remain closed to students until December 1.

=== Mount Calvary Retreat House and Monastery ===
The Mount Calvary Retreat House and Monastery in Santa Barbara, part of the Order of the Holy Cross, was also destroyed.

== Response and resources ==
"My family and I have come many, many times to the Santa Barbara area. We think it’s the most beautiful area. But the area we walked around today looked like hell". (Governor Arnold Schwarzenegger, November 15, 2008)

—

California Governor Arnold Schwarzenegger declared a state of emergency for Santa Barbara County due to the Tea Fire. Schwarzenegger issued a statement that he was "making all state resources available to the fire commanders and was requesting assistance from the federal government as well."

On November 14, 2008, 1,141 personnel were on the scene, including 260 from CalFire, and 25 fire crews. They were supported by 193 engines, 7 dozers, and 1 watertender. Resources were expanded on November 15 to include 2,235 firefighters and 9 helicopters with cost estimates of $3.5 million, which increased to $3.9 million the following day.

Staffed from 8 a.m. to midnight, a public information call center was established to provide updates and status reports. Information was made available on the County Government-access television (GATV) cable television station, as well as specific AM and FM radios that provided Emergency Public Information. CSBTV Channel 20 ran a live video stream.

San Marcos High School in Santa Barbara became an emergency shelter, operated by the American Red Cross, Santa Barbara County Chapter. Earl Warren Showgrounds was opened for large animal evacuees, while small animals could be brought to the Santa Barbara Humane Society in Goleta.

== See also ==
- 2008 California wildfires
- Sayre Fire
- Freeway Complex Fire
