= Summit Fire (2008) =

2008 wildfire in California

- Part of the 2008 California wildfires
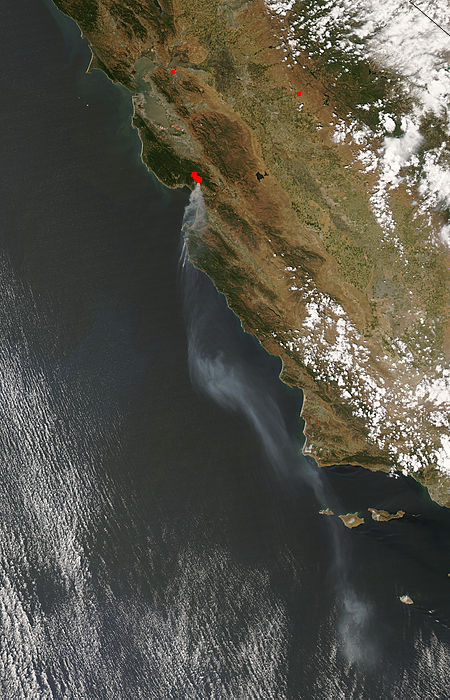
- NASA satellite photo from May 22, 2008 showing the smoke plumes.
- Date: May 22, 2008 –; May 27, 2008
- Location: Santa Cruz Mountains
- Coordinates: 37.07°N 121.82°W

Statistics
- Burned area: 4,270 acres (17 km^{2})

Impacts
- Structures lost: 35 residences; 64 outbuildings

Map
- Location of fire in California

The Summit Fire was a wildfire that started on May 22, 2008, in the Santa Cruz Mountains, near Corralitos, California, United States. The fire was fully contained on May 27, 2008. No injuries or fatalities occurred, with the exception of twelve firefighters who received minor sprains, cuts and strains.

The fire prompted mandatory evacuations of homes in the area. Several elementary, middle, and high schools were closed following the fire. California Governor Arnold Schwarzenegger declared a state of emergency for Santa Cruz County. The cause of the fire was an unattended burn pile .

The fire has approached the area 2 miles (3.2 km) to the east which was consumed in October 2002 – the Croy Fire.

== Evacuations ==
The fire affected Santa Clara and Santa Cruz Counties. Approximately 1,400 homes were evacuated. Of them 336 were mandatory. More than 2900 firefighters fought the fire. Residents were ordered to evacuate the area shortly before 3 PM. The fire also affected Maymens Flat, a tiny community of fewer than ten homes.

== Response ==
A state of emergency was declared by Arnold Schwarzenegger. He excused himself during a meeting with presidential candidate John McCain to comment on the fire.
