= Susan Pangelinan =

American member of the United States Air Force

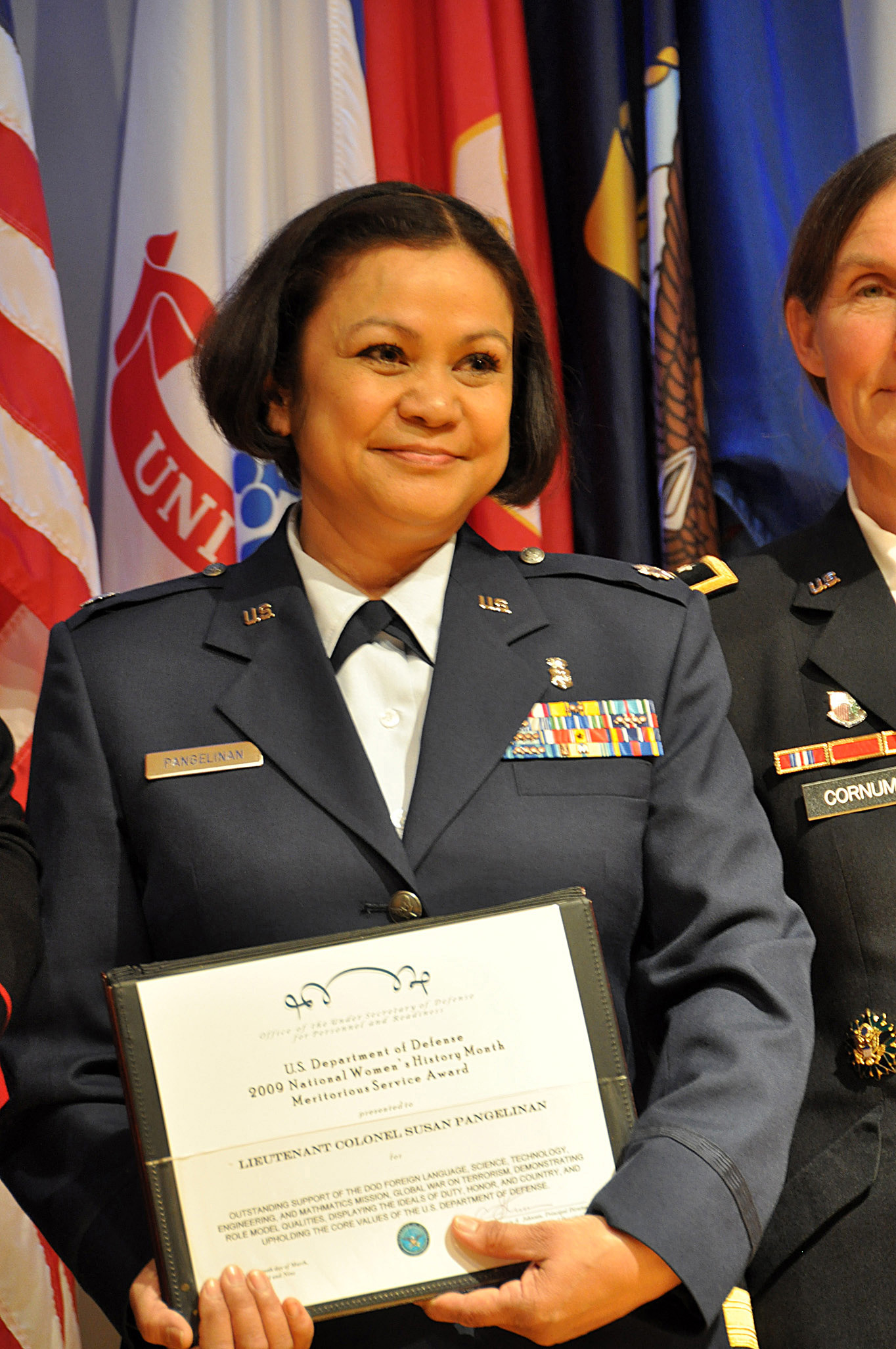
- Born: 1961 (age 64–65); Andersen Air Force Base, Guam
- Military career
- Allegiance: United States of America
- Branch: United States Air Force, California National Guard
- Service years: 2002–present
- Rank: Colonel
- Awards: Department of Defense Science, Technology, Engineering and Math Role Model Award, 2009

Susan Pangelinan is a Chamorro-American member of the United States Air Force who oversaw California's response to the 2008 wildfires. She was awarded the STEM Role Model Award by the Department of Defense in 2009, and Business Insider called her one of the Most Impressive Women in the U.S. Military in 2013.

== Early life and education ==
Pangelinan was born in 1961 on Andersen Air Force Base in Guam to her father, Artemio Pangelinan, a retired Air Force serviceman, and her mother, Chilang Pangelinan.

== Military career ==
Pangelinan is a veteran of Operation Desert Storm, and was assigned to the Pentagon following the September 11th attacks. She also assisted with rescue operations in New York City. She served as Air Force medical personnel before joining the California National Guard in 2002.

She served as the National Guard's Medical Operations Officer during the 2008 California wildfires. In that position, Pangelinan oversaw the statewide response team tracking injuries, making an inventory of medical supplies and supporting military responders. In response to her work during the wildfires, the Department of Defense honored Pangelinan with the DoD Science, Technology, Engineering and Math Role Model Award on March 20, 2009.

In July 2013, Pangelinan was included on the Business Insider list of "Most Impressive Women in the U.S. Military."

Lt. Col. Pangelinan served as the California National Guard's joint staff medical advisor in 2013. In 2014, she became coordinator of the Guard's behavioral health program and took an active role in transitioning veterans back into civilian life after deployment. In January 2013, Pangelinan testified to the Little Hoover Commission that behavioral health support for veterans could be funded "like unemployment insurance" or as part of military demobilization. She is an outspoken advocate for the support of veterans suffering from mental illness or emotional distress. Pangelinan serves as the co-chair of the California Interagency Council on Veterans Suicide Prevention and Intervention Group and has served as an expert witness on military mental health. On 15 April, 2015, her promotion to full colonel was confirmed by the Senate.

== Personal life ==
Pangelinan is currently stationed in California and has two children, Tony and Lauren.

== Published works ==
- Pangelinan, Susan and Carlos, Mark. "Teledermatology in DoD Health Services Region 10" Journal of Healthcare Information Management, Vol. 13, No. 4. USA: Wiley Subscription Services, Inc, (1999): pp 57–67
- Pangelinan, Susan, et al. "Dissemination of Family-Centered Prevention for Military and Veteran Families: Adaptations and Adoption within Community and Military Systems of Care" Clinical Child and Family Psychology Review, Vol. 16, No. 4 USA: Springer(2013): pp 394–409
