= Mar Y Cel =

Park in Santa Barbara County, California

Coordinates: 34.4587°N 119.6582°W

- Interactive map of Mar Y Cel
- Location: Santa Barbara County, California, United States
- Nearest city: Montecito, California
- Area: Total area, 350 acres (1.4 km^{2}); Conservation easement, 150 acres (0.61 km^{2})
- Established: September, 2000
- Governing body: Land Trust for Santa Barbara County
- Website: www.sblandtrust.org/land/mar-cel-montecito/

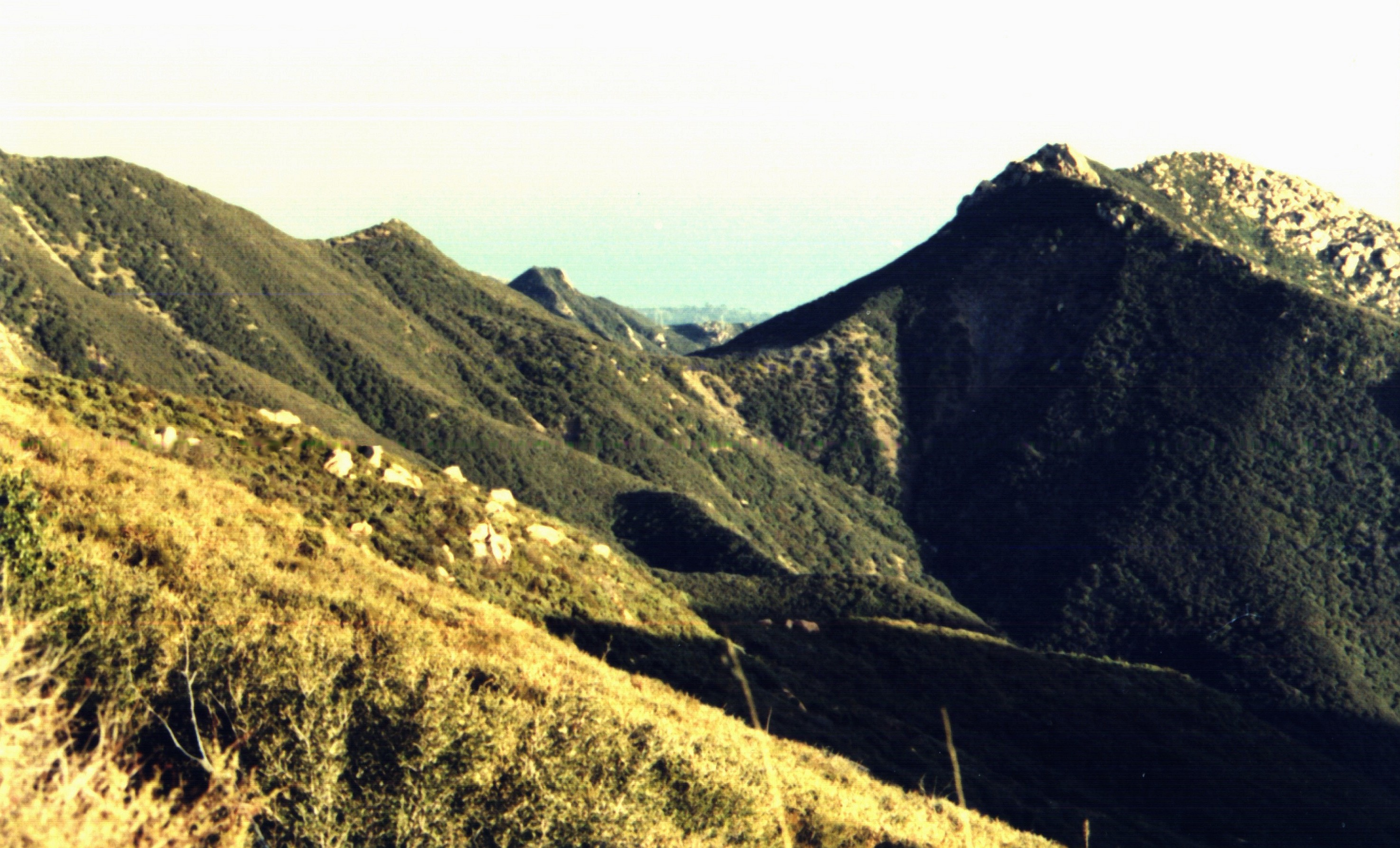
Santa Ynez Mountains, Santa Barbara County, California

Mar Y Cel, also known as Mar i Cel (Catalan: "Sea and Sky"), is a private Open space reserve in Santa Barbara County, California, United States, with a conservation easement held by the Land Trust for Santa Barbara County. Located in the Santa Ynez Mountains foothills above Montecito, Mar Y Cel is a 350-acre (1.4 km^{2}) estate. It includes the Tea Gardens as well as the West Fork of Cold Springs Trail, a well used hiking trail.

== Early history ==
Henry E. Bothin (pronounced, "bo-THEEN") (d. 1923), of Ohio, moved to San Francisco and began building up his financial holdings, starting with a spice and coffee factory in 1875 and then gaining large commercial real estate holdings. He was also president of Judson Manufacturing Company. Around 1916, Bothin and his second wife, heiress Ellen "Nellie" Chabot Bothin (1865–1965), added the 350-acre (1.4 km^{2}) Mar Y Cel property, commonly referred to as the "Tea Gardens", to their Montecito estate home, Piranhurst, which was nearing completion. Ellen's deceased father, Antoine "Anthony" Chabot, had been notable for his Bay Area water systems, and had been a colleague of Bothin's. Upon Mar Y Cel, the Bothins built stone aqueducts, water works, arches, and statues. The water projects included scalloped bowls that rested on columns, allowing water to spill from one bowl into the other. After completion, 35 gardeners maintained the area. Other construction included a 200-seat amphitheater, as well as the "Tea House", built as an open-air piazza, surrounded by four walls.

Following the June 29, 1925, magnitude 6.3, Santa Barbara earthquake, three of the Tea House walls were damaged. Subsequently, atmospheric painter and landscape designer Lockwood de Forest Jr. (1850–1932), added red brick garden planters to the property, while the water garden system was remodeled, costing one million dollars.

After Ellen's death, Edward F. Brown purchased a portion of Piranhurst from the family heirs. This led to the "Tea Gardens" property becoming a separate parcel which the Bothin family sold to Mr. Shirley Carter Burden (1908–1989), a fine arts photographer, writer, and great-great-grandson of Cornelius Vanderbilt. Burden later resold it to the current owners.

== 21st century ==
In September 2000, Cima del Mundo LLC, an environmental investment group, offered to donate a conservation easement on a portion of Mar Y Cel: the northern 150 acres (0.61 km^{2}). This eliminated the possibility of future residential development while ensuring the protection of both wildlife habitat and the property's scenic beauty. In addition, the company granted a .5 miles (0.80 km) easement to the Land Trust ensuring that a portion of the Cold Spring Trail is open for public use.

On November 13, 2008, the Montecito Tea Fire ignited the historic "Tea House" structure above Mountain Drive. Over the course of several days, the fire spread and burned 1,940 acres (8 km^{2}), destroyed over 200 homes, and injured 13 people.
