= Sesnon Fire =

2008 wildfire in Southern California

- Part of the 2008 California wildfires
- Date: October 13, 2008 –; October 18, 2008
- Location: Porter Ranch, Los Angeles, California
- Coordinates: 34.3213°N 118.5586°W

Statistics
- Burned area: 14,703 acres (60 km^{2})

Impacts
- Structures lost: 15 residences; 63 outbuildings
- Cost: $12.6 million (2008 USD)

Ignition
- Cause: Downed powerlines

The Sesnon Fire (also known as the Porter Ranch Fire) was a wildfire that broke out near the oil fields of Oat Mountain, north of Porter Ranch, California, on Monday October 13, 2008. The cause of this fire was a power line falling onto dry brush near a drainage area. A state of emergency was declared by Governor Arnold Schwarzenegger on October 13 in Los Angeles and Ventura Counties. The fire burned more than 22 square miles (57 km^{2}) and cost US$7.9 million to fight. This fire occurred concurrently with two others, one in San Diego County and another at the eastern end of the San Fernando Valley. One person lost their life due to the low visibility on highways because of the smoke from the fire.

== Evacuations ==
Evacuations were ordered for Aliso Canyon, Box Canyon, Woolsey Canyon, Bell Canyon, Lake Manor, Dayton Canyon, Browns Canyon and areas west of Valley Circle Blvd. Evacuation centers were set up to help the people displaced by this fire as well as the Marek fire that affected areas close by. The main center was at San Fernando High School, where more than 750 evacuees registered. Other centers included El Camino High School, Shepherd of the Hills Church, and Canoga Park High School.

Residents living in these areas were allowed to return to their homes on Friday. As another precaution, authorities closed all major streets that were near the fire. These included: Topanga Canyon Boulevard northbound from Chatsworth Avenue DeSoto Avenue northbound at Rinaldi Street, Corbin Avenue northbound at Porter Ranch Drive, Mason Avenue northbound at Celtic Street, Mason Avenue northbound at Corbin Street, Ronald Reagan118 Freeway between Reseda Boulevard and Stearns Avenue, (Simi Valley).

== Recovery ==
The Sesnon fire sent shock waves through the southern California area, raging out of control and burning thousands of acres each day. The governor of California as well as nbclosangeles.com reported that 62 buildings were destroyed in the fire, including 15 homes and nbclosangeles.com reported that 41 vehicles were destroyed. More importantly, there was one fatality due to fire on the 118 freeway, and 30 firefighters were injured during the course of trying to contain and extinguish the fire. Many people lost their homes filled with everything they own, their places of business, and their method of transportation. With $2.5 million in damages, it will be a long road to recovery. However, according to ktla.com, multiple recovery meetings have been scheduled for fire victims in order to help them cope with their losses and deal with recovery in the appropriate ways.

== Cost of fighting fire ==
A few hours after the fire broke out it spread within minutes. Antonio Villaraigosa declared a local emergency for the entire City of Los Angeles. This meant that all funds need to fight the fire would be provided by the local government. A few days later California Governor Arnold Schwarzenegger declared a State of Emergency for Los Angeles and Ventura Counties. When the fire was finally extinguished the total cost of damage from the fire was $12.6 million. Local fire departments across Los Angeles County, Ventura County Fire, California Highway Patrol, National Park Service, Los Angeles County Sheriff's Office, Los Angeles Police Department, Southern California Edison, Southern California Gas, Los Angeles County Office of Emergency Services, CDCR helped the firefighters in safely extinguishing the fire.
