= Indians Fire =

2008 wildfire in Central California

- Part of the 2008 California wildfires
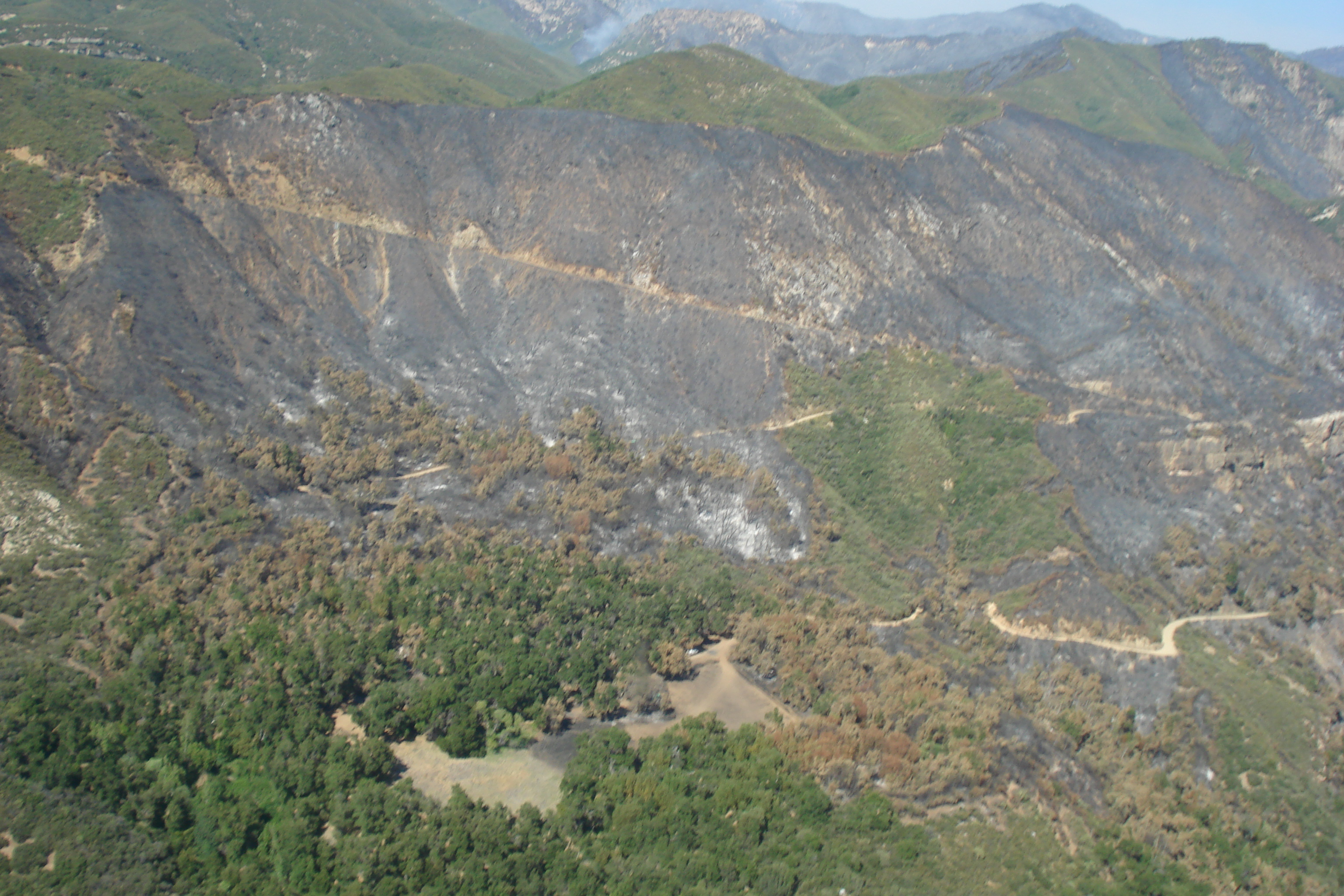
- Los Padres National Forest, Monterey Ranger District, Escondido Campground in foreground looking North
- Date: June 8, 2008 –; July 10, 2008
- Location: Ventana Wilderness, Monterey, California

Statistics
- Burned area: 81,378 acres (329.33 km^{2})

Ignition
- Cause: Escaped campfire

The Indians Fire was a wildfire in the Ventana Wilderness of the Los Padres National Forest in the Santa Lucia Range which that started on June 8, 2008 and burned uncontained until July 10 scorching 81,378 acres (329.33 km^{2}) of land. This fire burned predominantly within the Los Padres National Forest, Monterey Ranger District, inside the Ventana Wilderness. Other affected properties include portions of Fort Hunter Liggett military base and private property. The suppression cost exceeded $40.7 million, not including resource damages and rehabilitation costs.

On June 10, 2008, a residential structure on the Chase Ranch burned down. The ranch had restricted access; therefore, the damage was not documented by the Forest Service. A Forest Service Fire Prevention Technician risked her life to evacuate the reluctant cabin owner, just before the fire burned over the cabin.

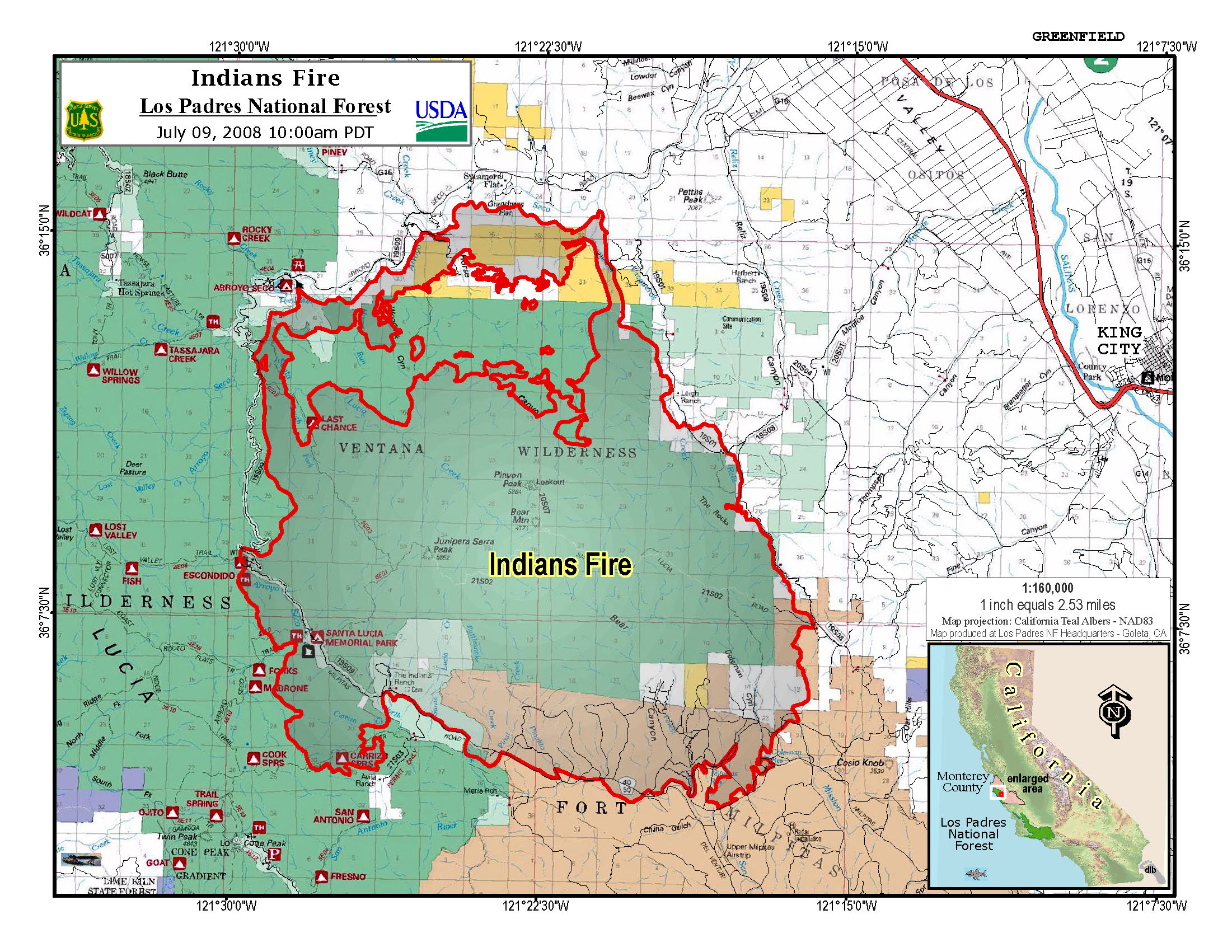
Area Burn Map

On June 11, 2008, during a burnout operation, aggressive fire behavior produced a fire plume which burned over Forest Service firefighters along the Del Venturi Road. An entrapment occurred when a rotating vertical plume developed and the crew became overcome by the fire. Three firefighters sustained major burns and were evacuated from the fire.

== Cause ==
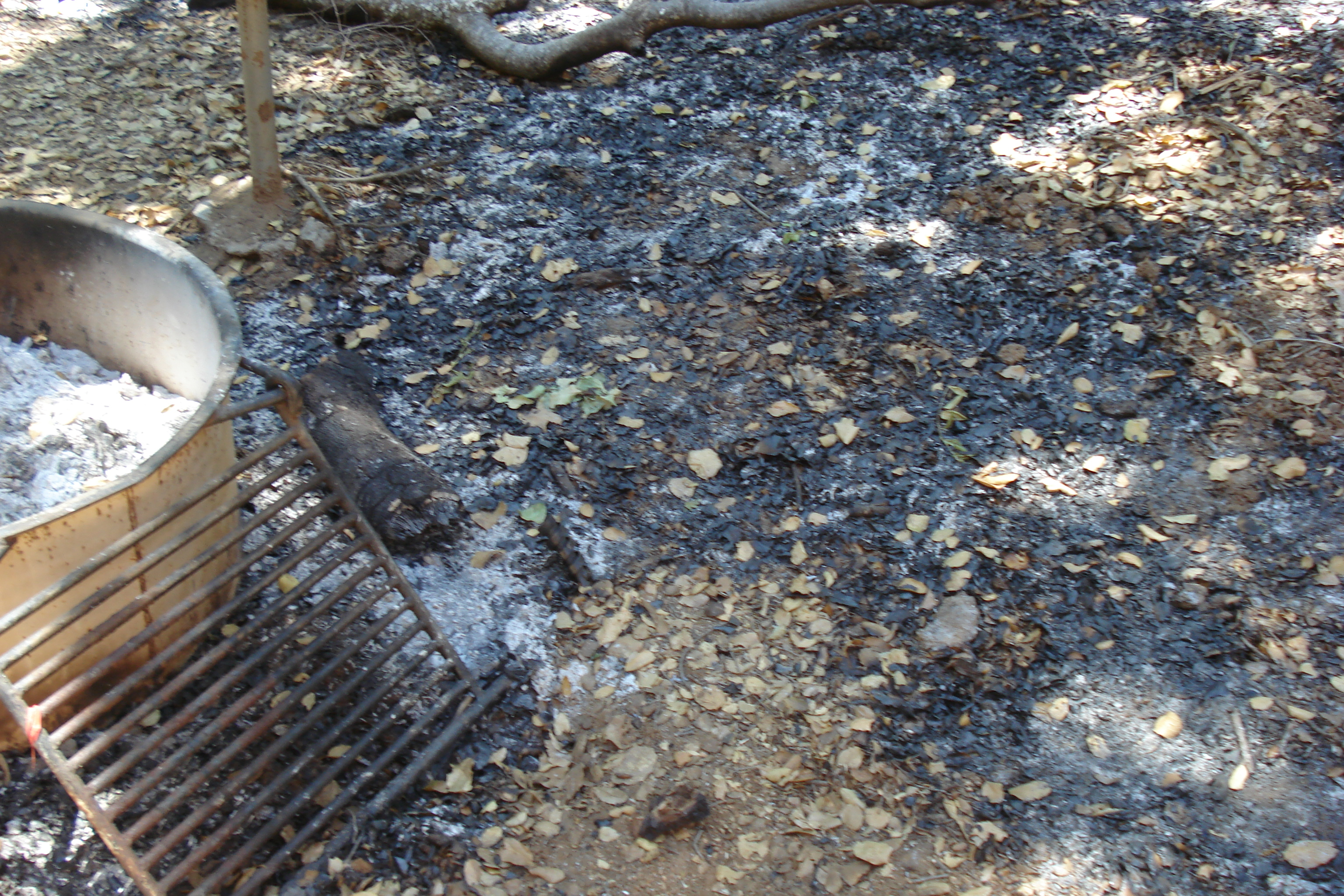
The fire's origin, coming from too long a branch used as fuelwood, then left unattended during the night, which burnt through and fell outside the fire ring.

The fire was ignited when an unattended campfire escaped into the vegetation during the night. Two subjects admitted to lighting the campfire that escaped from their control, and using the campfire without removing all flammable material from around the campfire. One camper awoke during the night to find Escondido Campground on fire. After their brief attempt to put out the fire, they hiked out 2.7 miles to their vehicle. Then drove out through the Fort Hunter Liggett main gate, at 3:58 a.m., without stopping to report the fire. The fire burned undetected for an additional 8 ½ hrs. until a hiker walking along a ridge, saw the smoke from 10 miles away and reported it at 12:36 p.m.

The escaped campfire occurred when the campfire ring had not been cleared of flammable ground litter and the campers went to sleep with the fire still burning. A burning log, which extended outside of the campfire ring, burned through and fell into oak leaf litter surrounding round the fire ring. The forest litter ignited and continued to spread during the night. The fire burned for a period of at least 5–6 hours before it escaped the campground. If the fire had been reported after it initially ignited, it would have been suppressed and contained the same day. The two subjects responsible for causing the Indian Fire pleaded guilty in Federal court.
