= List of California wildfires =

About 75% of California's 20 most destructive wildfires—measured in terms of structures burned—have occurred since 2015.

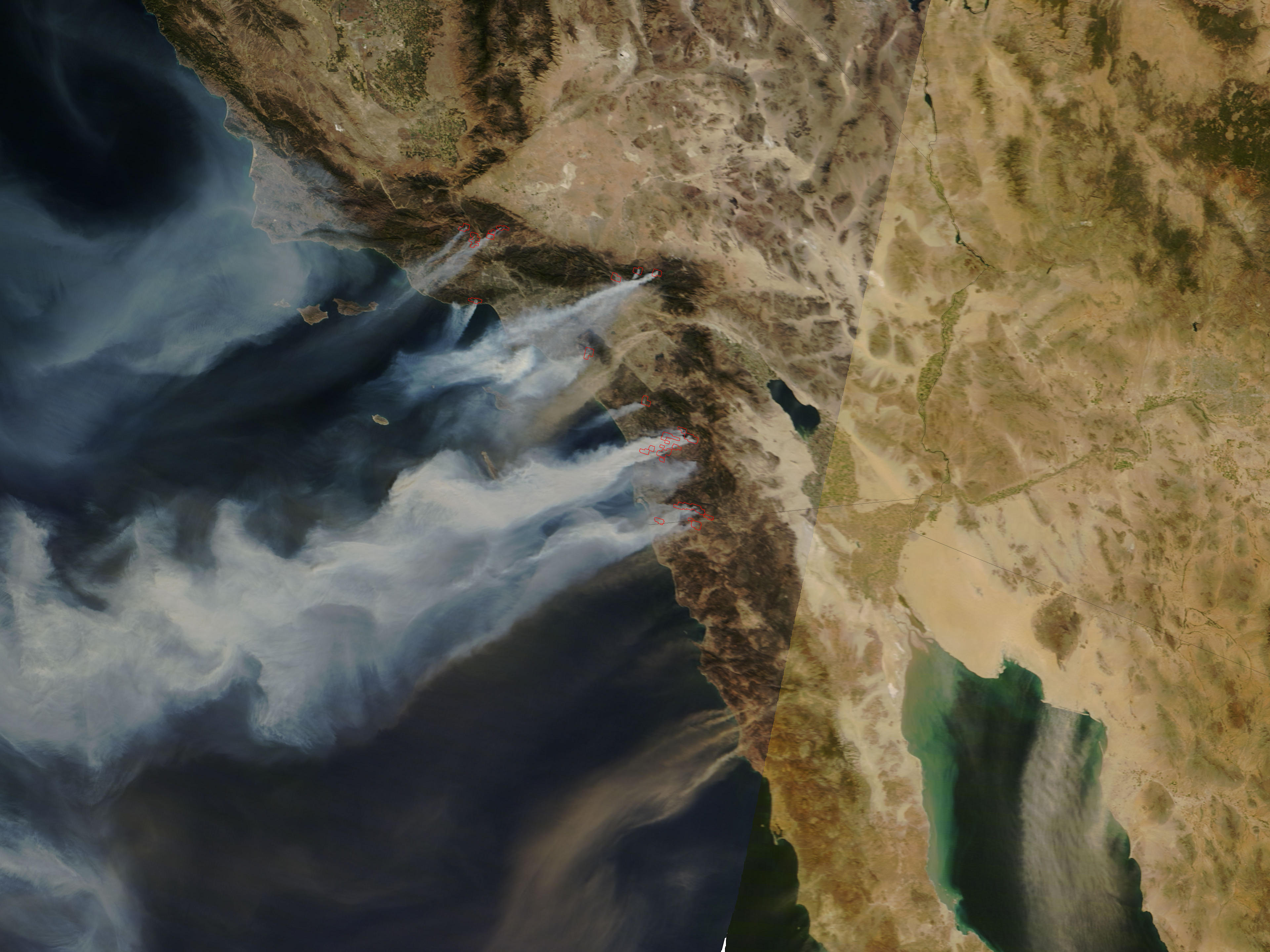
Santa Ana winds in California expand fires and spread smoke over hundreds of miles, as in this October 2007 satellite image.

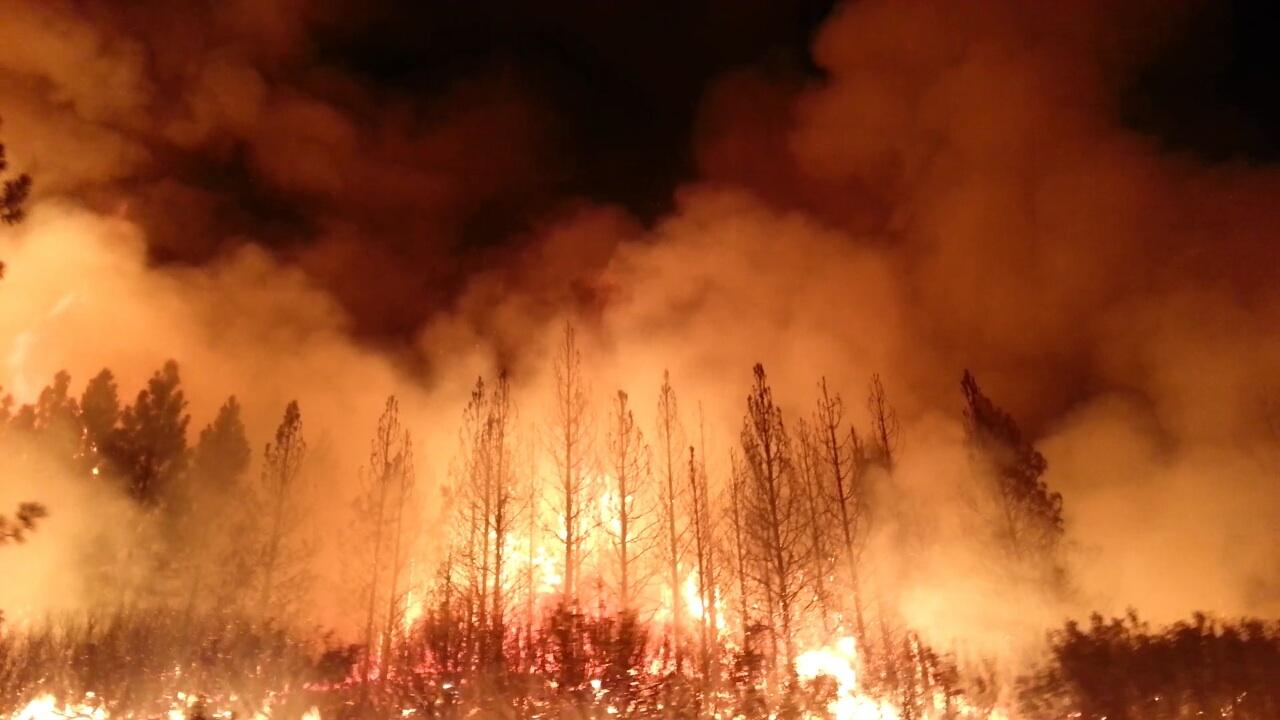
The Rim Fire consumed more than 250,000 acres (100,000 ha) of forest near Yosemite National Park, in 2013.

This is a partial and incomplete list of wildfires in the US state of California. California often has dry, windy, and hot weather from spring through late autumn, which can foment moderate to severe wildfires. Pre-1800, when the state was more forested and its ecology more resilient, 4.4–11.9 million acres (1.8–4.8 million hectares) of forest and scrubland burned annually. California’s land area totals 99.8 million acres, and since 2000, annual burned area has ranged between 90,000 acres and 4,397,809 acres, or 0.09% to 4.4% of California's total land area.

== Background ==
The timing of "fire season" in California is variable, depending on the amount of prior winter and spring precipitation, the frequency and severity of weather such as heat waves and wind events, and moisture content in vegetation. Northern California typically sees wildfire activity between late spring and early fall, peaking in the summer with hotter and drier conditions. Occasional cold frontal passages can bring wind and lightning. The timing of fire season in Southern California is similar, peaking between late spring and fall. The severity and duration of peak activity in either part of the state is modulated in part by weather events: downslope/offshore wind events can lead to critical fire weather, while onshore flow and Pacific weather systems can bring conditions that hamper wildfire growth.

== Causes ==
Climate change in California has lengthened the fire season and made it more extreme from the middle of the 20th century.

Since the early 2010s, wildfires in California have grown more dangerous because of the accumulation of wood fuel in forests, higher population, and aging and often poorly maintained electricity transmission and distribution lines, particularly in areas serviced by Pacific Gas and Electric. United States taxpayers pay about US$3 billion a year to fight wildfires, and big fires can lead to billions of dollars in property losses. At times, these wildfires are fanned or made worse by strong, dry winds, known as Diablo winds when they occur in the northern part of the state and Santa Ana winds when they occur in the south. However, from a historical perspective, it has been estimated that prior to 1850, about 4.5 million acres (17,000 km^{2}) burned yearly, in fires that lasted for months, with wildfire activity peaking roughly every 30 years, when up to 11.8 million acres (47,753 km^{3}) of land burned. The much larger wildfire seasons in the past can be attributed to the policy of Native Californians regularly setting controlled burns and allowing natural fires to run their course, which prevented devastating wildfires from overrunning the state. There are conservation issues that prevent some controlled burns necessary to lessen the damage for when a wildfire starts.

== Effects ==
More than 350,000 people in California live in towns sited completely within zones deemed to be at very high risk of fire. In total, more than 2.7 million people live in "very high fire hazard severity zones", which also include areas at lesser risk.

On lands under CAL FIRE's jurisdictional protection (i.e. not federal or local responsibility areas), the majority of wildfire ignitions since 1980 have been caused by humans. The four most common ignition sources for wildfires on CAL FIRE-protected lands are, in order: equipment use, powerlines, arson, and lightning.

A 2023 study found that these wildfires are affecting the California ecosystem and disrupting the habitats. It found that in the 2020 and 2021 fire seasons 58% of the area affected by wildfires occurred in those two seasons since 2012. These two fires destroyed 30% of the habitat of 50 species as well as 100 species that had 10% of their habitats burn. 5-14% of the species' habitats burned at a "high severity."

== Statistics ==
=== Area burned per year ===
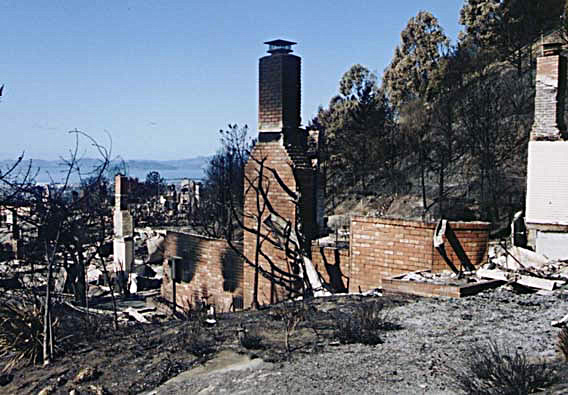
Remains of houses destroyed in the Oakland firestorm of 1991

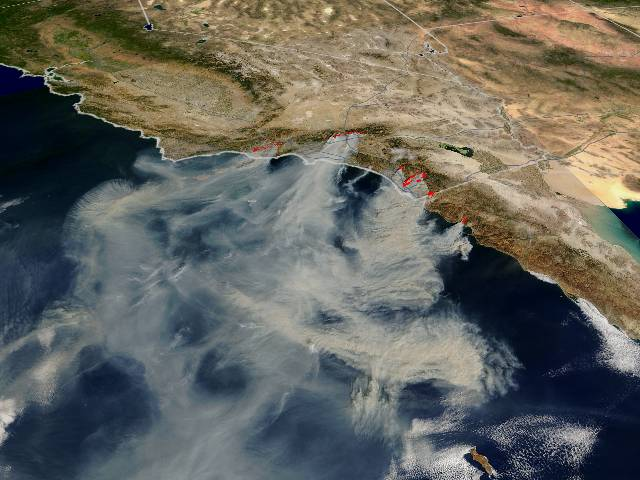
Satellite image from October, 2003 including Cedar Fire, one of the largest wildfires in California history

Starting in 2001, the National Interagency Fire Center began keeping more accurate records on the total fire acreage burned in each state.

Year	Fires	Acres	Hectares	Ref
2000	7,622	295,026	119,393	
2001	9,458	329,126	133,193	
2002	8,328	969,890	392,500	
2003	9,116	1,020,460	412,970	
2004	8,415	264,988	107,237	
2005	7,162	222,538	90,058	
2006	8,202	736,022	297,858	
2007	9,093	1,520,362	615,269	
2008	6,255	1,593,690	644,940	
2009	9,159	422,147	170,837	
2010	6,554	109,529	44,325	
2011	7,989	168,545	68,208	
2012	7,950	869,599	351,914	
2013	9,907	601,635	243,473	
2014	7,865	625,540	253,150	
2015	8,745	893,362	361,531	
2016	6,986	669,534	270,951	
2017	9,560	1,548,429	626,627	
2018	8,527	1,975,086	799,289	
2019	7,860	259,823	105,147	
2020	9,639	4,397,809	1,779,730	
2021	8,835	2,568,948	1,039,616	
2022	7,490	362,455	146,680	
2023	7,127	324,917	131,489	
2024	8,024	1,050,012	424,925	
2025	8,036	525,223	212,550	
2000-25 Mean	8,227	935,565	378,610	
2000-25 Median	8,119	647,537	262,049	

== Largest wildfires ==
As of October 2, 2024, the 20 largest wildfires since 1932 according to the California Department of Forestry and Fire Protection have been:

	Fire name (cause)	County	Acres (hectares)	Start date	Structures	Deaths
1.	August Complex (lightning)	Mendocino, Humboldt, Trinity, Tehama, Glenn, Lake, & Colusa	1,032,648 (417,898)	August 2020	935	1
2.	Dixie (power lines)	Butte, Plumas, Lassen, Shasta & Tehama	963,309 (389,837)	July 2021	1,311	1
3.	Mendocino Complex (human-related)	Colusa, Lake, Mendocino, & Glenn	459,123 (185,800)	July 2018	280	1
4.	Park (arson)	Butte, Plumas, Shasta, & Tehama	429,603 (173,854)	July 2024	709	0
5.	SCU Lightning Complex (lightning)	Stanislaus, Santa Clara, Alameda, Contra Costa, & San Joaquin	396,625 (160,508)	August 2020	225	0
6.	Creek (undetermined)	Fresno & Madera	379,895 (153,738)	September 2020	858	0
7.	LNU Lightning Complex (lightning/arson)	Napa, Solano, Sonoma, Yolo, Lake, & Colusa	363,220 (146,990)	August 2020	1,491	6
8.	North Complex (lightning)	Butte, Plumas & Yuba	318,935 (129,068)	August 2020	2,352	15
9.	Thomas (power lines)	Ventura & Santa Barbara	281,893 (114,078)	December 2017	1,060	2
10.	Cedar (human-related)	San Diego	273,246 (110,579)	October 2003	2,820	15
11.	Rush (lightning)	Lassen	271,911 (110,038) (+43,666 (17,671) in Nevada)	August 2012	0	0
12.	Rim (campfire)	Tuolumne	257,314 (104,131)	August 2013	112	0
13.	Zaca (equipment)	Santa Barbara	240,207 (97,208)	July 2007	1	0
14.	Carr (vehicle)	Shasta & Trinity	229,651 (92,936)	July 2018	1,614	8
15.	Monument (lightning)	Trinity	223,124 (90,295)	August 2021	28	0
16.	Caldor (bullet)	Alpine, Amador, & El Dorado	221,835 (89,773)	August 2021	1,311	1
17.	Matilija (undetermined)	Ventura	220,000 (89,000)	September 1932	0	0
18.	River Complex (lightning)	Siskiyou & Trinity	199,359 (80,678)	July 2021	122	0
19.	Witch (power lines)	San Diego	197,990 (80,120)	October 2007	1,650	2
20.	Klamath Theater Complex (lightning)	Siskiyou	192,038 (77,715)	June 2008	0	2

== Deadliest wildfires ==
As of January 28, 2025, the 20 deadliest wildfires since 1932 according to the California Department of Forestry and Fire Protection have been:

	Fire name (cause)	County	Acres (hectares)	Start date	Structures	Deaths
1.	Camp (power lines)	Butte	153,336 (62,053)	November 2018	18,804	85
2.	Griffith Park (unknown)	Los Angeles	47 (19)	October 1933	0	29
3.	Tunnel (Rekindle)	Alameda	1,600 (650)	October 1991	2,900	25
4.	Tubbs (electrical)	Napa & Sonoma	36,807 (14,895)	October 2017	5,643	22
5.	Eaton (Power Lines)	Los Angeles	14,021 (5,674)	January 2025	9,418	19
6.	North Complex (lightning)	Butte, Plumas & Yuba	318,935 (129,068)	August 2020	2,352	15
7.	Cedar (signal fire)	San Diego	273,246 (110,579)	October 2003	2,820	15
8.	Rattlesnake (arson)	Glenn	1,340 (540)	July 1953	0	15
9.	Palisades (Rekindle)	Los Angeles	23,448 (9,489)	January 2025	6,837	12
10.	Loop (unknown)	Los Angeles	2,028 (821)	November 1966	0	12
11.	Hauser Creek (human-related)	San Diego	13,145 (5,320)	October 1943	0	11
12.	Inaja (human-related)	San Diego	43,904 (17,767)	November 1956	0	11
13.	Iron Alps Complex (lightning)	Trinity	105,855 (42,838)	August 2008	10	10
14.	Redwood Valley (power lines)	Mendocino	36,523 (14,780)	October 2017	544	9
15.	Harris (undetermined)	San Diego	90,440 (36,600)	October 2007	548	8
16.	Canyon (unknown)	Los Angeles	22,197 (8,983)	August 1968	0	8
17.	Carr (vehicle)	Shasta & Trinity	229,651 (92,936)	July 2018	1,614	8
18.	LNU Lightning Complex (lightning/arson)	Napa, Sonoma, Yolo, Stanislaus & Lake	363,220 (146,990)	August 2020	1,491	6
19.	Atlas (power lines)	Napa & Solano	51,624 (20,891)	October 2017	781	6
20.	Old (arson)	San Bernardino	91,281 (36,940)	October 2003	1,003	6

== Most destructive wildfires ==
As of January 28, 2025, the 20 most destructive wildfires since 1932 according to the California Department of Forestry and Fire Protection have been:

	Fire name (cause)	County	Acres (hectares)	Start date	Structures	Deaths
1.	Camp (power lines)	Butte	153,336 (62,053)	November 2018	18,804	85
2.	Eaton (powerline)	Los Angeles	14,021 (5,674)	January 2025	9,418	19
3.	Palisades (arson)	Los Angeles	23,707 (9,594)	January 2025	6,837	12
4.	Tubbs (electrical)	Napa & Sonoma	36,807 (14,895)	October 2017	5,646	22
5.	Tunnel (rekindle)	Alameda	1,600 (650)	October 1991	2,900	25
6.	Cedar (signal fire)	San Diego	273,246 (110,579)	October 2003	2,820	15
7.	North Complex (lightning)	Butte, Plumas, & Yuba	318,935 (129,068)	August 2020	2,352	15
8.	Valley (electrical)	Lake, Napa & Sonoma	76,067 (30,783)	September 2015	1,955	4
9.	Witch (power lines)	San Diego	197,990 (80,120)	October 2007	1,650	2
10.	Woolsey (electrical)	Ventura	96,949 (39,234)	November 2018	1,643	3
11.	Carr (vehicle)	Shasta & Trinity	229,651 (92,936)	July 2018	1,614	8
12.	Glass (undetermined)	Napa & Sonoma	67,484 (27,310)	September 2020	1,520	0
13.	LNU Lightning Complex (lightning/arson)	Napa, Solano, Sonoma, Yolo, Lake, & Colusa	363,220 (146,990)	August 2020	1,491	6
14.	CZU Lightning Complex (lightning)	Santa Cruz & San Mateo	86,509 (35,009)	August 2020	1,490	1
15.	Nuns (power line)	Sonoma	54,382 (22,008)	October 2017	1,355	3
16.	Dixie (power line)	Butte, Plumas, Lassen, & Tehama	963,309 (389,837)	July 2021	1,311	1
17.	Thomas (power line)	Ventura & Santa Barbara	281,893 (114,078)	December 2017	1,063	23
18.	Caldor (bullet)	Alpine, Amador, & El Dorado	221,835 (89,773)	August 2021	1,003	1
19.	Old (arson)	San Bernardino	91,281 (36,940)	October 2003	1,003	6
20.	Jones (undetermined)	Shasta	26,200 (10,600)	October 1999	954	1

== Areas of repeated ignition ==
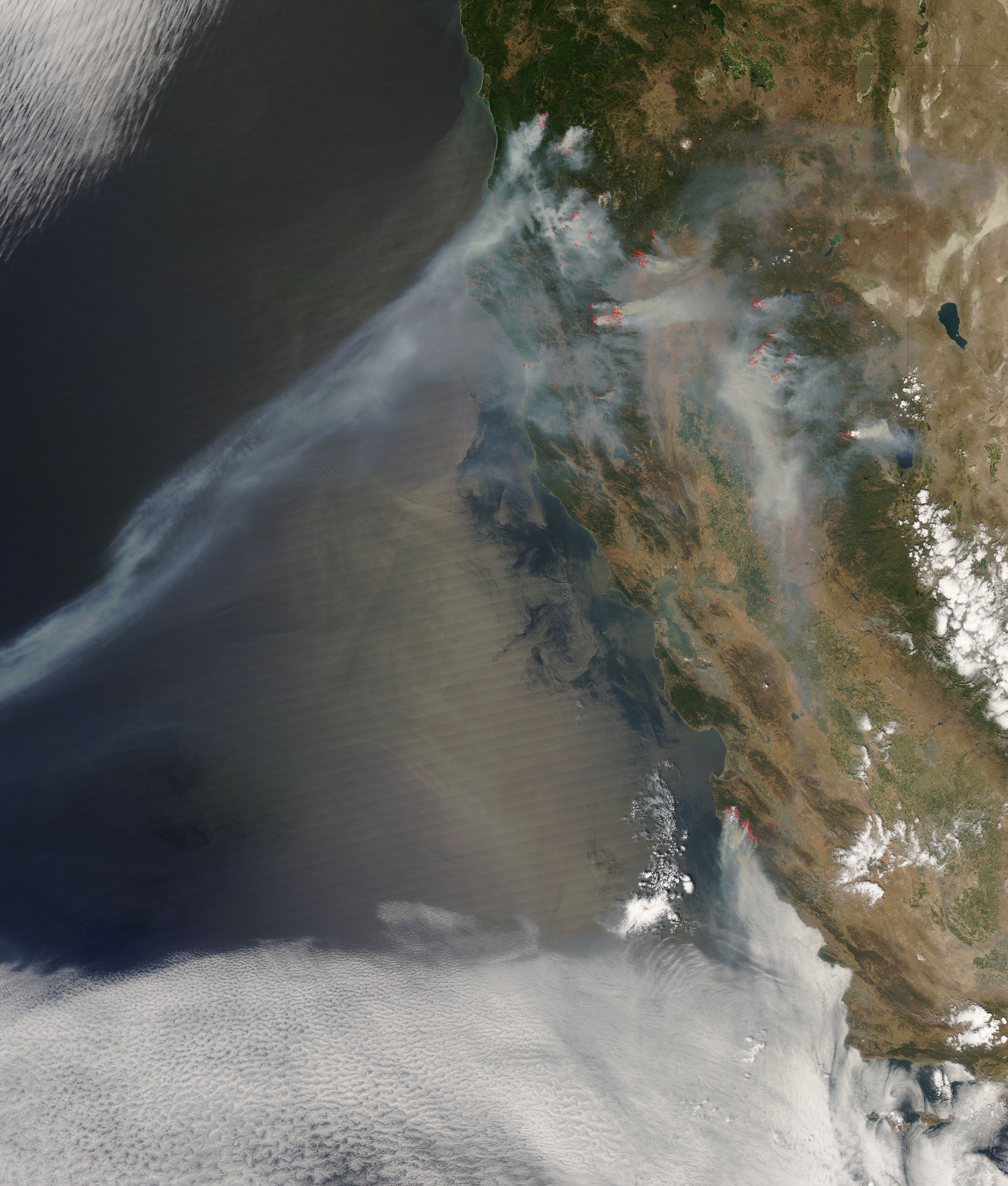
The summer 2008 wildfires were widespread and deadly, with at least 3,596 wildfires of various origins burning throughout Northern and Central California, for around four months.

In some parts of California, fires recur with some regularity. In Oakland, for example, fires of various size and ignition occurred in 1923, 1931, 1933, 1937, 1946, 1955, 1960, 1961, 1968, 1970, 1980, 1990, 1991, 1995, 2002, 2008, and 2024. Orange County, Riverside County, San Bernardino County, and Los Angeles County are other examples. Orange and San Bernardino counties share a border that runs north to south through the Chino Hills State Park, with the park's landscape ranging from large green coastal sage scrub, grassland, and woodland, to areas of brown sparsely dense vegetation made drier by droughts or hot summers. The valley's grass and barren land can become easily susceptible to dry spells and drought, therefore making it a prime spot for brush fires and conflagrations, many of which have occurred since 1914. Hills and canyons have seen brush or wildfires in 1914, the 1920s, 1930s, 1940s, 1950s, 1960s, 1970s, 1980s, 1990s, 2000s, and into today.

On occasion, lightning strikes from thunderstorms may also spark wildfires in areas that have seen past ignition. Examples of this are the 1999 Megram Fire, the 2008 California wildfires, as well as the LNU and SCU Lightning Complex fires (both in 2020).

== See also ==
- Climate of California

- List of California floods
- List of California tornadoes
- List of California hurricanes

- List of wildfires
- Wildfires in the United States

- List of Arizona wildfires
- List of New Mexico wildfires
- List of Oregon wildfires
