= Klamath Theater Complex Fire =

2008 wildfire in Northern California

- Part of the 2008 California wildfires
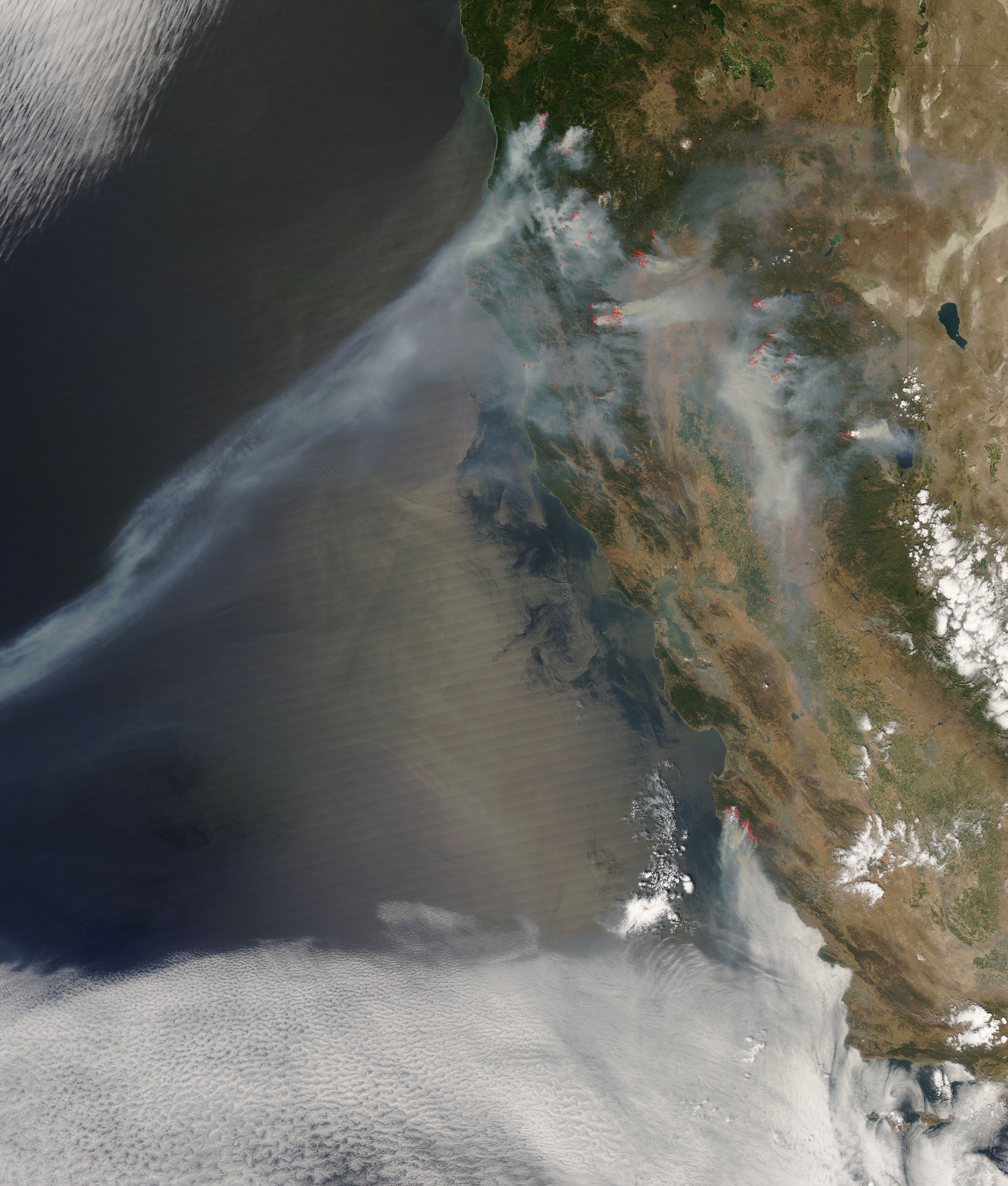
- NASA satellite image of the Summer 2008 California wildfires on July 9, 2008. The fires that merged to form the Klamath Theater Complex Fire can be seen burning near the upper center portion of the image.
- Date: June 21, 2008 –; September 30, 2008
- Location: Siskiyou and Del Norte Counties, Northern California

Statistics
- Burned area: 192,038 acres (300 mi^{2}; 777 km^{2})

Impacts
- Deaths: 2 firefighters
- Injuries: Unknown
- Structures lost: None
- Cost: >$150 million (2008 USD)

Ignition
- Cause: Lightning

The Klamath Theater Complex Fire, also known as the Bear Wallow Complex Fire, was the largest wildfire of the 2008 California wildfire season. The complex fire originated as 11 separate wildfires, before merging into a single massive complex fire that burned 192,038 acres (777.15 km^{2}) in Northern California, and lasted for over 3 months. The progenitor fires of the fire complex were all caused by lightning. As of 2024, the Klamath Theater Complex Fire was the 19th largest fire in modern California history. The complex fire killed a total of two firefighters.

== Progression ==
On June 20, 2008, the Blue 2 Fire was ignited by lightning near the eastern edge of Del Norte County. On the next day, the first fires within the Siskiyou Complex Fire were ignited by lightning further east, in the western fringes of Siskiyou County. On June 21, 2008, at 4:00 PM PDT, the Caribou Fire, the first fire in the Bear Wallow Complex Fire was sparked by lightning, to the east of the Blue 2 and Siskiyou Complex Fires, in Klamath National Forest, in Northern California. Soon afterward, the Anthony Milne Fire was ignited by lightning nearby, with firefighters managing the Caribou and Anthony Milne Fires together. Three other wildfires were subsequently ignited nearby, which quickly combined into the South Ukonom Complex Fire; the South Ukonom Complex Fire gradually expanded towards the other two wildfires.

On July 23, the Caribou Fire significantly expanded in size, and also ran towards the Anthony Milne Fire. By August 8, the Caribou, Anthony Milne, and South Ukonom Complex Fires had merged, forming the Bear Wallow Complex Fire. On August 13, to the west of the Bear Wallow Complex Fire, the Blue 2 Fire merged into the larger Siskiyou Complex Fire (which originated as 5 separate wildfires), increasing the size of the Siskiyou Complex Fire to 72,571 acres (293.68 km^{2}). On September 11, the Siskiyou Complex Fire, which had grown to 88,069 acres (356.40 km^{2}), merged with the Bear Wallow Complex Fire to the east, which was at 48,551 acres (196.48 km^{2}), creating a massive complex fire that was renamed to the Klamath Theater Complex Fire.

The Klamath Theater Complex Fire continued to expand, reaching a size of 190,601 acres (771.33 km^{2}) by September 22, with containment of the complex fire increasing to 75% by then. The Klamath Theater Complex Fire was finally contained on September 30, 2008, after reaching a size of 192,038 acres (777.15 km^{2}).

== See also ==
- Rush Fire
- 2008 California wildfires
- List of California wildfires
- Slater and Devil fires
