= Carson Helicopters =

Flight operations company

- Type: Private
- Industry: Aerospace
- Founded: 1963
- Headquarters: Perkasie, Pennsylvania, U.S.
- Products: Commercial helicopters
- Website: carsonhelicopters.com

Carson Helicopters, Inc is a helicopter-manufacturing company based in Perkasie, Pennsylvania, United States. Carson operates a fleet of Sikorsky S-61 helicopters in aerial lift services and aerial firefighting. Carson developed the "Carson Blade" for the S-61 and H-3 Sea King. In 2010, Carson Helicopters, Inc. partnered with Sikorsky Aircraft to develop and manufacture the S-61T, an upgraded version of the S-61 helicopter. Since then, Carson has specialized in the design, prototyping, and manufacturing of composite aerostructures and specialized mission kits for SH-3/S-61/UH-60 helicopters.

Founder and president Franklin Carson died on October 25, 2024.

== Upgrade programs ==
=== British Royal Navy upgrade program ===
In 2007, Carson Helicopters partnered with the British Royal Navy to modernize its HC4 Sea King helicopters. British forces encountered challenges operating the Sea Kings in Afghanistan due to the country's high altitude and low air density, which significantly reduced lift and forward speed.

The upgrades involved replacing the aircraft’s outdated metal main rotor blades with Carson Composite Main Rotor Blades and using the five-bladed composite tail rotor from the Agusta Westland. "A Carson composite main rotor and AgustaWestland five-bladed tail rotor were installed, tested and deployed in only 12 months after a [Urgent Operational Requirement] UOR from the MoD. The program cost US$10.1 million."

The increased performance provided by the Carson composite main rotor blades enabled the aircraft to operate at its operational and design capability in hot and high environments without having to strip weight or decrease defensive aids, such as armor or weapons and ammunition.

=== S-61T Program ===
In February 2010, the U.S. State Department signed an open-ended contract for as many as 110 Sikorsky S-61 Triton Helicopters ("S-61T") for U.S. diplomatic transportation and cargo services.

The S-61T, which was an upgraded SH3H, included a fully modernized glass cockpit with digital screens and avionics, crashworthy seats, a modular wiring harness derived from the UH-60 Black Hawk, as well as engine and transmission improvements. Upgrades also included the Carson Composite Main Rotor Blades which provided a 10 knot increase in cruising speed using the same horsepower and a 1750 lb. increase in lift.

=== Argentina SH-3 Program ===
In 2020, Carson Helicopters was contracted by the Argentine Navy to provide two fully upgraded SH-3 Helicopters. These upgrades mirrored the S-61T Program formerly delivered to the U.S. State Department. The mission set for the aircraft included the Antarctic resupply Mission, troop transport, and utility flights for the Navy.

== Incidents and accidents ==
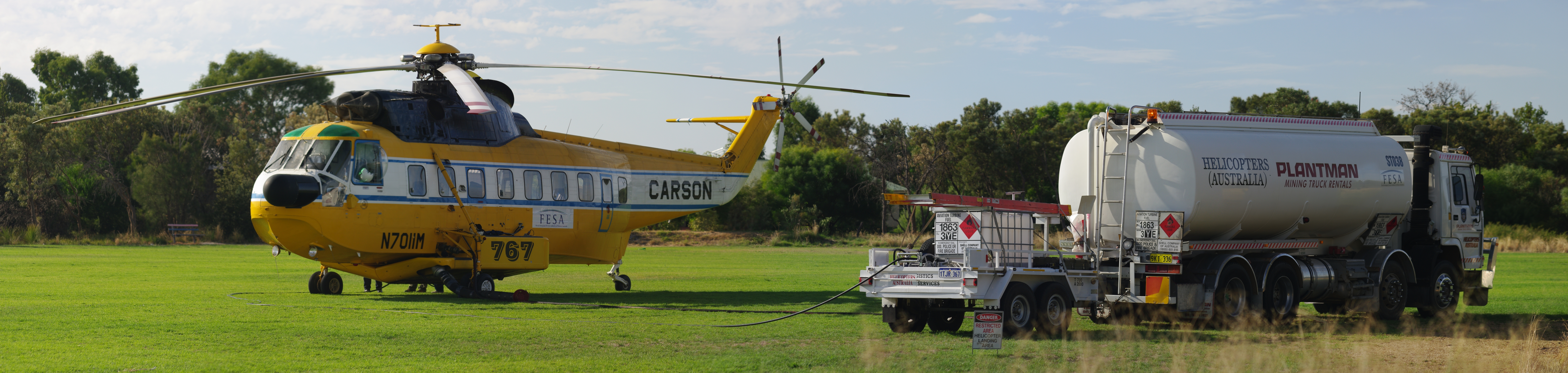
A Carson Helicopter S-61N Fire King being refueled during firefighting operations in Southern River, Western Australia.

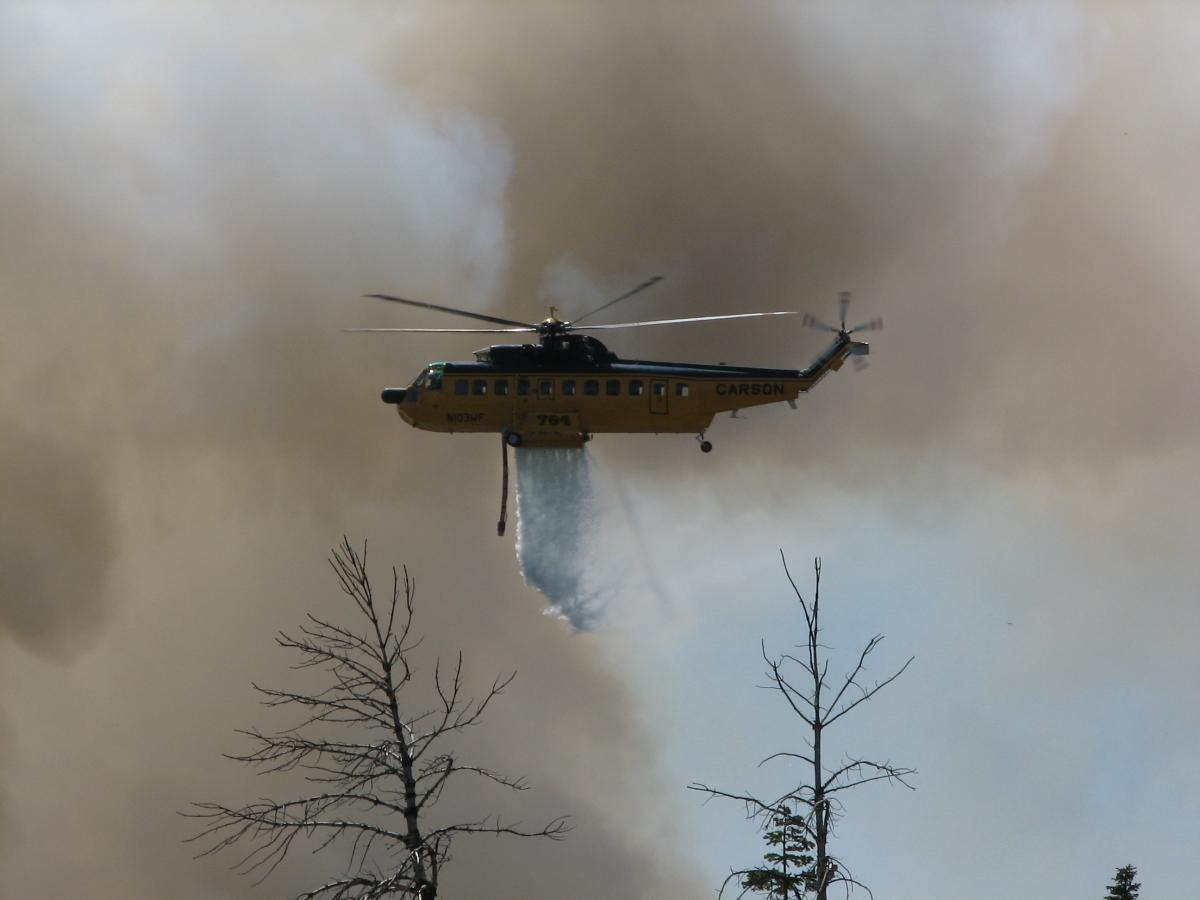
A Carson Helicopters Fire King drops on the 2007 WSA Lightning Complex fire.

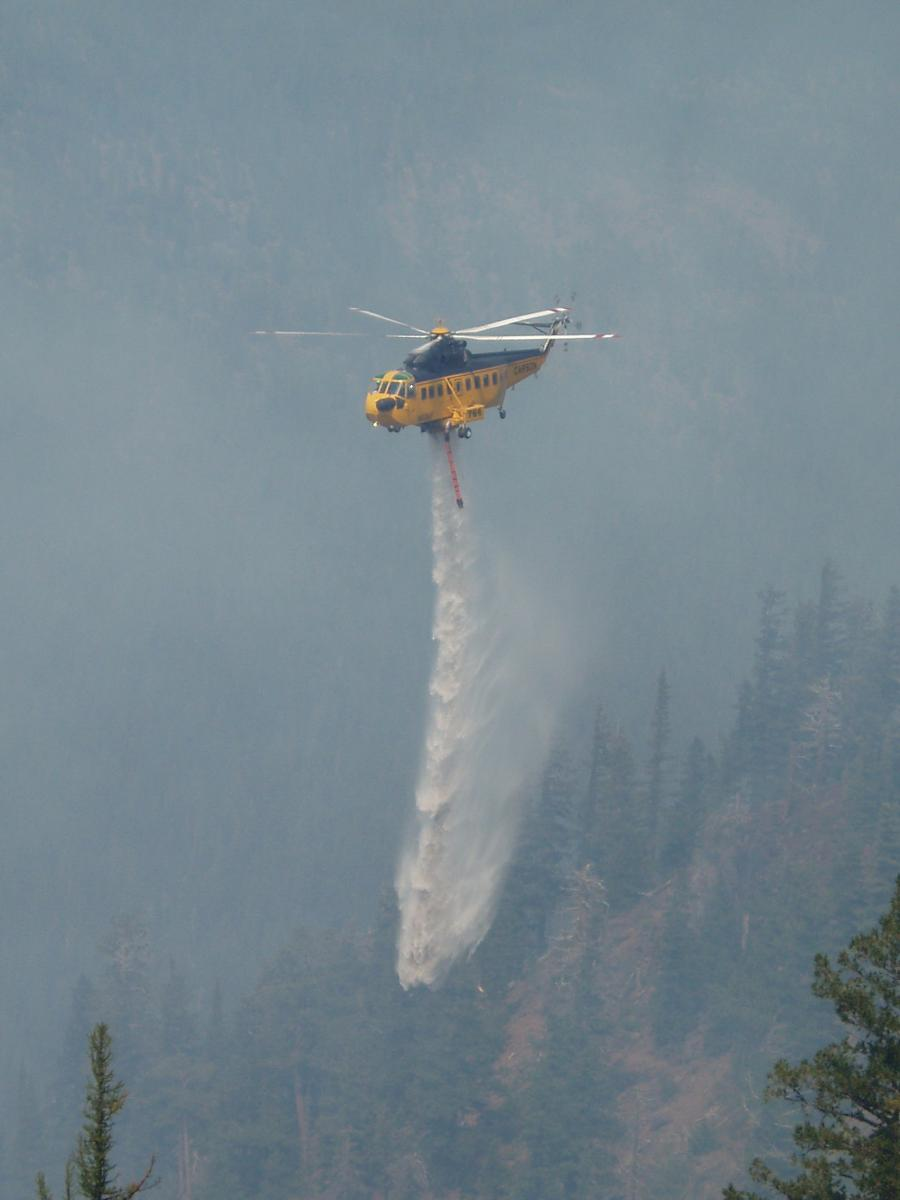
A Carson Helicopters Fire King drops on the 2007 WSA Lightning Complex fire.

- On 9 March 1996 a Carson Helicopters de Havilland Canada DHC-6 Twin Otter (reg. N245GW) departed Bagua, in Peru's Amazonas Region, on an aerial geological survey near the Cenepa River, in Peru's dense Amazon region jungle near the disputed border with Ecuador. The plane did not return to Bagua, and no communications were ever sent by the plane, with SAR operations turning out unsuccessful. The plane may have had run out of fuel and crashed as bad weather en route reportedly altered the planned course, leading to the aircraft's fuel becoming critical. No flight plan was filed. The occupants, an American pilot-in-command, an American survey operator, and a Peruvian Air Force observer, are presumed deceased.
- On 9 June 2008 workers from Carson Helicopters sparked a fire in the Great Dismal Swamp National Wildlife Refuge which burned for 111 days. Carson Helicopters had been in the process of completing a 1,110 acre clearing project to remove trees damaged by Hurricane Isabel in 2003 when sparks from logging equipment ignited the blaze A federal contract with Carson Helicopters allowed the company to keep valuable cedar recovered during the clean up effort in exchange for also removing unusable timber. The fire was declared out on October 7, 2008. Total cost to suppress the 4 month, 4,884-acre blaze has been estimated at over $12.5 million.
- On 5 August 2008 a Carson Helicopters Sikorsky S-61N crashed on take off. The copilot and three firefighters escaped the burning wreckage and survived with serious injuries. The NTSB's preliminary report determined that the cause was a loss of power on take off probably caused by an engine failure. Relatives of the victims concerned by the change in the NTSB report filed a lawsuit against General Electric and on March 27, 2012 a jury unanimously ruled that the primary cause of the accident was the failure of the GE CT-58 engines. In 2015 former VP Steve Metheny was sentenced to prison for falsifying documents related to a 2008 crash that killed seven firefighters and two pilots. A federal jury had earlier found that the primary cause of the crash was the failure of the GE-designed engine, specifically issues with the engine's fuel control, of which GE had previously been notified.
