= 2008 Carson Helicopters Sikorsky S-61 crash =

Aviation accident in California, United States

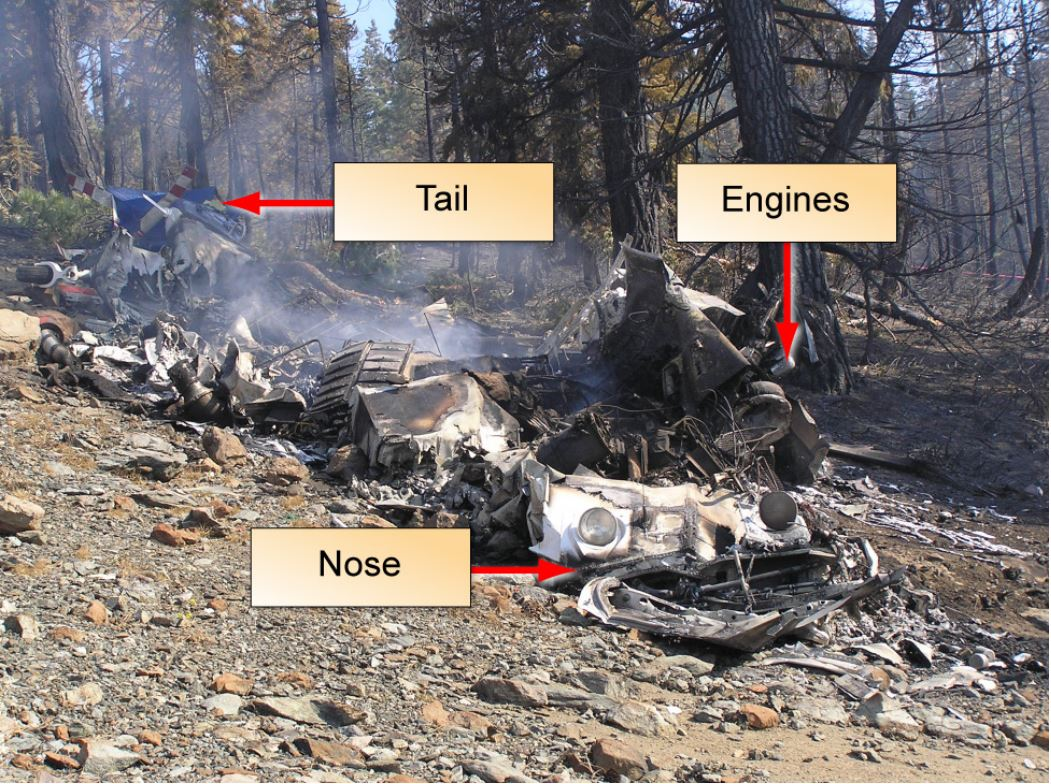
- Wreckage of the helicopter

Accident
- Date: August 5, 2008
- Summary: Crash on take off during firefighting operations
- Site: Shasta-Trinity National Forest, California, USA; 40.9130°N 123.2520°W

Aircraft
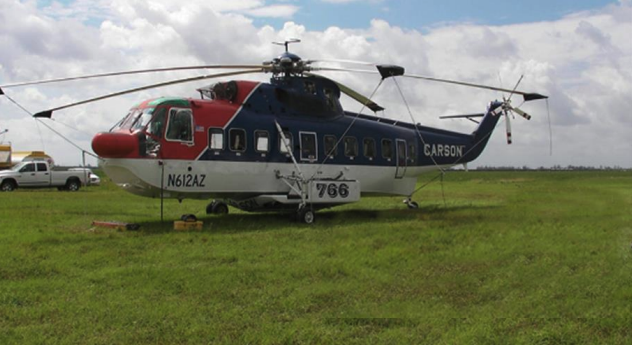
- N612AZ, the aircraft involved in the accident
- Aircraft type: Sikorsky S-61N
- Operator: Carson Helicopters
- Call sign: Iron 44
- Registration: N612AZ
- Occupants: 13
- Passengers: 10
- Crew: 3
- Fatalities: 9
- Injuries: 4
- Survivors: 4

Location of the crash site at Helispot 44

On August 5, 2008, a Sikorsky S-61N helicopter, N612AZ, operated by Carson Helicopters, impacted trees and terrain during its initial climb after taking off from Helispot 44 near Weaverville, California, while transporting firefighters under contract to the U.S. Forest Service.

The pilot in command, a USFS inspector pilot, and seven firefighters were fatally injured, and the copilot and three other firefighters were severely injured but survived.

== Investigation ==
The NTSB's preliminary report determined that the cause was a loss of power on takeoff probably caused by an engine failure.

However, in January 2010, the NTSB issued its final report finding that the crash's probable cause was Carson's intentional understatement of the helicopter's empty weight; alteration of the power-available chart to exaggerate the helicopter's lift capability; the practice of using unapproved, above-minimum-specification torque in performance calculations that, collectively, resulted in the pilots’ relying on performance calculations that significantly overestimated the helicopter's load-carrying capacity and that did not provide an adequate performance margin for a successful takeoff; and insufficient oversight by the USFS and the FAA.

The NTSB report also noted contributory factors that included the 1965 helicopter's lack of crash-resistant fuel tanks and outdated seats.

== Aftermath ==
As a result of the incident and the subsequent investigation, the USFS canceled its contract with Carson Helicopters. In 2010, the NTSB found that there was “intentional wrong-doing” on the part of Carson Helicopters because the company over-stated its performance in the documents they provided to the USFS when bidding on $20 million in firefighting contracts for seven helicopters.

In 2012, a jury ordered General Electric, the manufacturer of the helicopter's engines, to pay $69.7 million to William Coultas, the surviving pilot, his wife, and the estate of Roark Schwanenberg. The trial stemmed from Coultas' belief that a contaminated fuel control unit on the aircraft's number two GE CT58-140-1 engine caused the crash. The NTSB dismissed the FCU as a cause of the crash.

In September 2013, Steven Metheny and Levi Phillips were indicted by a federal grand jury. Metheny, a former vice president of Carson Helicopters, and Phillips, director of maintenance at Carson Helicopters, were charged with conspiracy to defraud the USFS involving contracts awarded to Carson Helicopters in 2008 for helicopter services in firefighting operations. Metheny was also charged in 22 other counts that include making false statements to the USFS and endangering the safety of aircraft in flight.

Metheny pled guilty in 2014 to one count each of filing a false statement and of conspiracy to commit mail and wire fraud, and was sentenced to 12 years and 7 months in prison. Phillips agreed to cooperate with authorities in the case against Metheny and pled guilty to a single charge of fraud. He was sentenced to 25 months in prison.

== Casualties ==
A total of nine people were killed in the crash, seven of whom were firefighters.

- Pilot Roark Schwanenberg, 54
- USFS inspector pilot Jim Ramage, 64
- Firefighter Shawn Blazer, 30
- Firefighter Scott Charlson, 25
- Firefighter Edrik Gomez, 19
- Firefighter Matt Hammer
- Firefighter Steven Caleb Renno
- Firefighter Bryan Rich, 29
- Firefighter David Steele, 19
