= Power Fire =

2004 wildfire in Northern California

- Part of the 2004 California wildfires
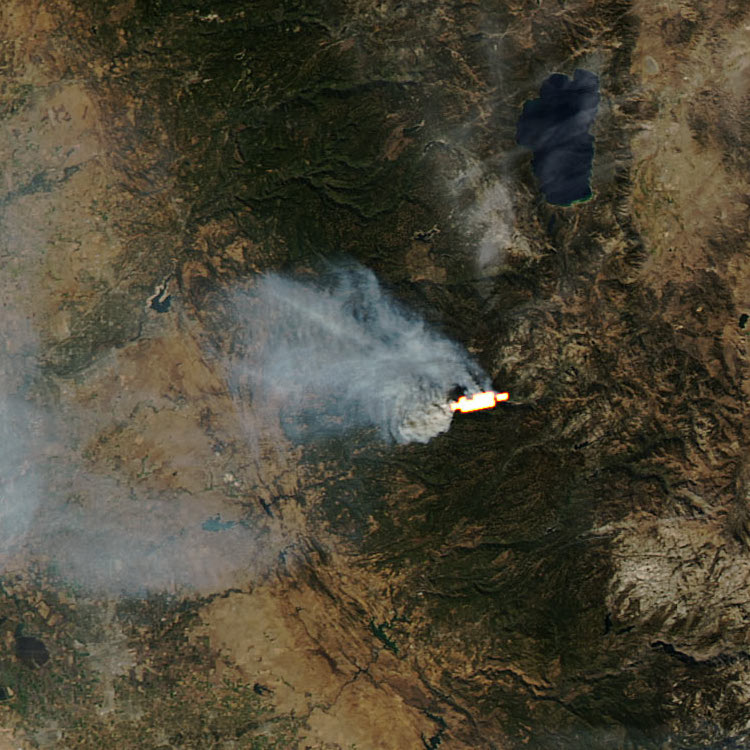
- The Power Fire was photographed on Oct. 13, 2004, by NASA's Aqua satellite. Southwest of Lake Tahoe, active fire is highlighted in yellow.
- Date: October 6 –; October 21, 2004; (15 days)
- Location: Amador County, Northern California, United States
- Coordinates: 38°29′55″N 120°12′54″W

Statistics
- Burned area: 17,005 acres (6,882 ha; 27 sq mi; 69 km^{2})

Impacts
- Injuries: 4
- Structures destroyed: 0
- Cost: $8.46 million (approx. $11.2 million in 2024) in firefighting costs

Map
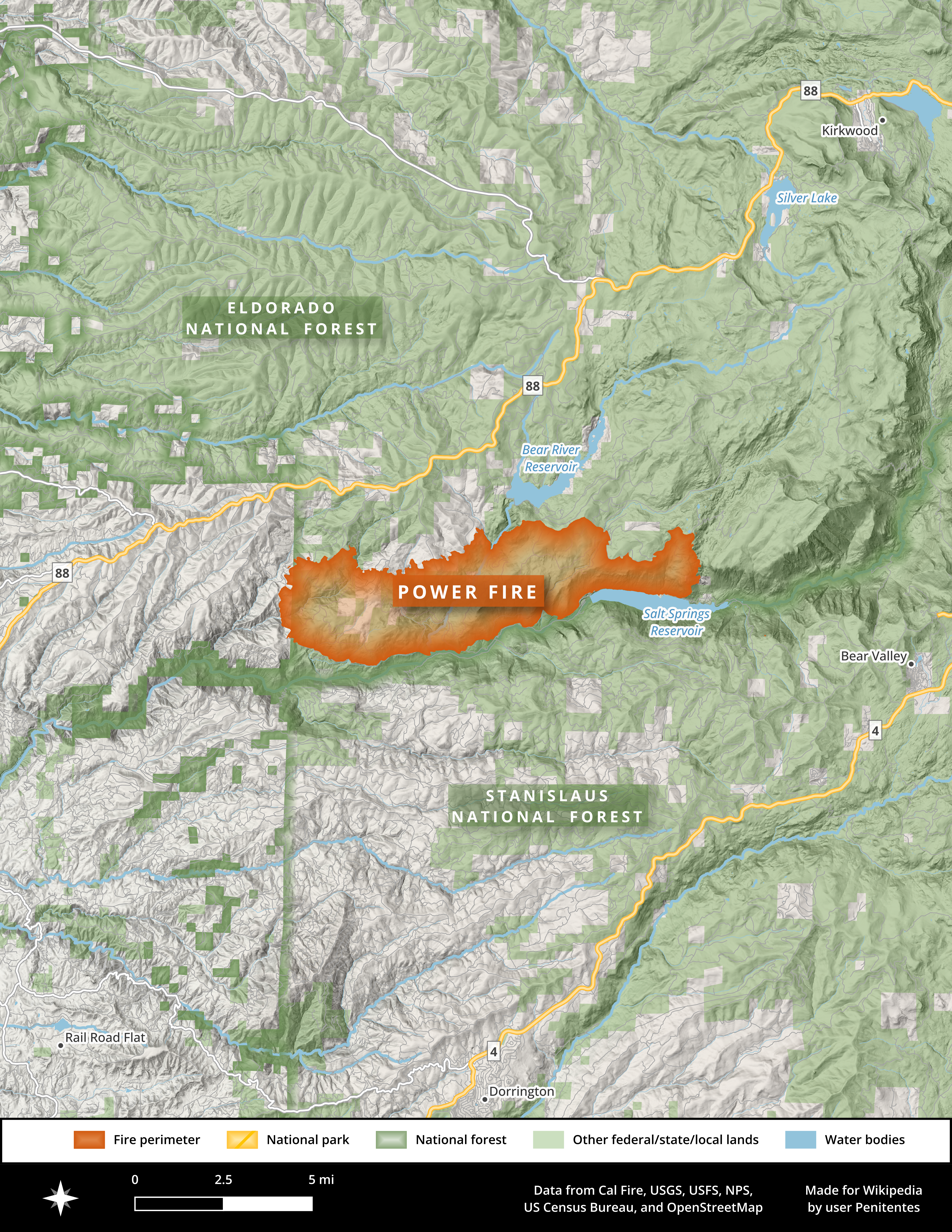
- The extent of the Power Fire, which burned in the Eldorado National Forest

- The location of the Salt Springs Reservoir in Northern California, near the Power Fire's start point

The Power Fire was a large wildfire in Northern California's Amador County in October 2004. The fire began on October 6 and burned approximately 17,000 acres (6,900 hectares), largely in the Eldorado National Forest, before it was contained on October 21. The fire was begun by workers trimming vegetation around Pacific Gas and Electric Company (PG&E) power lines, and the federal government sued both PG&E and the company contracted to do the trimming. The contractor eventually paid the federal government $45 million (equivalent to about $59.6 million in 2024).

== Background ==
California's 2004 wildfire season was milder than the previous year. Over the course of the year a total of 7,898 individual wildfires burned a total of 311,024 acres (125,867 ha). Prior to the Power Fire in early October, over 171,000 acres (69,000 ha) had burned.

== Progression ==
The Power Fire was ignited on Wednesday, October 6, 2004, by employees of Quanta Services subsidiary VCS Sub (or Provco). They had been hired by electric utility Pacific Gas and Electric Company (PG&E) to clear vegetation from around a 12-kilovolt transmission line near the utility's dam at Salt Springs Reservoir in the Eldorado National Forest. During their work the employees took a break to smoke in a forested area and left their cigarettes lit, starting the fire.

The Power Fire, named for the nearby hydroelectric powerhouse, was located on the north side of Salt Springs Reservoir. The fire proceeded to burn along the north side of the Mokelumne River canyon in Amador County, approximately 17 miles (27 km) east of the community of Pioneer.

The fire burned for six days, and by midday on Tuesday, October 12, the fire had been declared contained at roughly 490 acres (200 ha). That afternoon and overnight, sustained winds of 40 miles per hour (64 km/h) carried embers more than two miles (3.2 km) downwind, reinvigorating and expanding the fire. By the morning of Wednesday, October 13 the fire had burned more than 4,600 acres (1,900 ha) and was 10 percent contained. At this point the resources engaged on the fire included more than 20 handcrews, 10 bulldozers, seven helicopters, and four air tankers.

In the evening on Thursday, October 14, the fire had burned 12,000 acres (4,900 ha) and was 35 percent contained. On the 15th, the figures were 12,500 acres (5,100 ha) and 35 percent containment, and on the 16th, 12,900 acres (5,200 ha) and 40 percent containment. By October 17th the burned area had increased to 16,800 acres (6,800 ha) and containment had reached 50 percent.

Containment increased to more than 90 percent on Monday the 18th, and the Power Fire was declared fully contained on October 21, 2004, having burned 17,005 acres (6,882 ha). More than 13,600 acres (5,500 ha) of the burn area were within national forests. The Power Fire cost $8.46 million (equivalent to about $11.2 million in 2024) to contain.

== Effects ==
The Power Fire did not destroy nor damage any structures. At least four non-life-threatening firefighter injuries were reported.

Public campgrounds, summer camps, and summer homes in the Salt Springs Reservoir and Bear River Reservoir areas were evacuated, including the Bear River Resort, the Camp Winton Boy Scout Camp, and 48 vacation cabins. Roughly 100 residents in total were evacuated.

More than 15 miles (24 km) of California State Route 88 between Mormon Emigrant Trail and Omo Ranch Road were temporarily closed on October 13. A 24-mile (39 km) portion of the highway closed on October 15 because of poor visibility from smoke throughout Amador County. Along with the Rumsey and Freds fires, smoke from the Power Fire contributed to an increase in asthma and emphysema patients and delays or cancellations of sporting events in the Central Valley.

The fire was the largest in more than 25 years on the Amador Ranger District of the Eldorado National Forest. Many portions of the burn area saw moderate to high-intensity fire effects, leading to 75–100 percent tree mortality and soil erosion. In December following the fire, the Forest Service proposed salvage logging about 8,000 acres (3,200 ha) within the fire area.

== Litigation ==
The federal government filed a civil suit in the Eastern District of California against PG&E and Quanta Services in August of 2012, accusing both parties of negligence in hiring the work crews that had started the fire without having rules in place about smoking in the forest during hazardous fire conditions. The lawsuit was settled in June of 2013 when Quanta Services agreed to pay the government $45 million (equivalent to $59.6 million in 2024). PG&E paid no money as part of the settlement and neither they nor Quanta Services admitted responsibility for the fire. The settlement money was to go toward "the rehabilitation of forest land, the reforestation of burned areas and firefighting costs", according to the San Francisco Chronicle.

== See also ==
- Glossary of wildfire terms
- List of California wildfires
- 1999 Pendola Fire
- 2000 Storrie Fire
- 2001 Poe Fire
- 2007 Moonlight Fire
