= Dennis Montali =

American judge

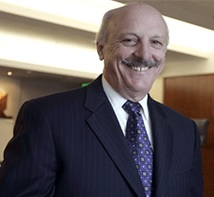

Judge of the United States Bankruptcy Court for the Northern District of California
- In office April 23, 1993 – April 2021
- Appointed by: U.S. Court of Appeals in San Francisco

Personal details
- Born: Dennis Montali; May 20, 1940 (age 85)
- Education: University of Notre Dame (BA); University of California, Berkeley (JD)

Military service
- Branch/service: United States Navy

Dennis Montali (born May 20, 1940) is an American attorney and jurist who served as a United States bankruptcy judge of the United States Bankruptcy Court for the Northern District of California.

== Early life and education ==
Montali was born in 1940 in San Francisco. His father founded Montali Winery (later Audubon Cellars) in Berkeley. In 1957, at the age of 17, he was the navigator for a 40 foot sailboat in the Transpacific Yacht Race from Los Angeles to Hawaii. He attended Bishop O'Dowd High School and earned a Bachelor of Arts degree from the University of Notre Dame in June, 1961. He entered the United States Navy to fulfill a four-year Reserve Officers' Training Corps commitment. After his discharge in 1965, he earned a Juris Doctor from the UC Berkeley School of Law in 1968.

== Career ==
Dennis Montali started at the law firm of Rothschild and Phelen in San Francisco in April, 1968 as a law student, returned in September, 1968, and was admitted to the bar in January, 1969. Montali practiced law with August Rothschild, Robert Phelan and Lloyd King until December, 1975, when Lloyd was appointed as the Referee in Bankruptcy in San Francisco. Montali continued on with what became the law firm of Rothschild, Phelan & Montali. Montali joined the legal giant Pillsbury, Madison & Sutro in 1980 and stayed there until he was appointed as a judge in 1993.

During the early part of his career, Dennis Montali became an established expert in bankruptcy law representing debtors. While at the law firm of Pillsbury, Madison & Sutro, he became a creditor's attorney, where he became nationally known for his knowledge of bankruptcy law. He has been a member of numerous judicial and professional organizations, including the National Conference of Bankruptcy Judges and the American College of Bankruptcy.

=== Federal judicial service ===
Dennis Montali was appointed by the U.S. Court of Appeals in San Francisco to be a United States Bankruptcy Judge on April 23, 1993, and reappointed April 22, 2007. His term expired in April 2021.

Judge Dennis Montali was a member of the Bankruptcy Appellate Panel for the Ninth Circuit from May, 2000 to May, 2010, and was Chief Judge from 2009 to 2010.

=== Notable bankruptcy cases ===
Judge Dennis Montali presided over the bankruptcy of Pacific Gas & Electric Company (PG&E) that was filed in April, 2001. At the time, it was the largest utility bankruptcy in U.S. history.

Judge Dennis Montali presided over the bankruptcy of PG&E that was filed in January, 2019. Again, this was the largest utility bankruptcy in U.S. history, and was also one of the most complex in U.S. history.
