= Jones Fire (1999) =

1999 wildfire in Northern California

- Part of the 1999 California wildfires
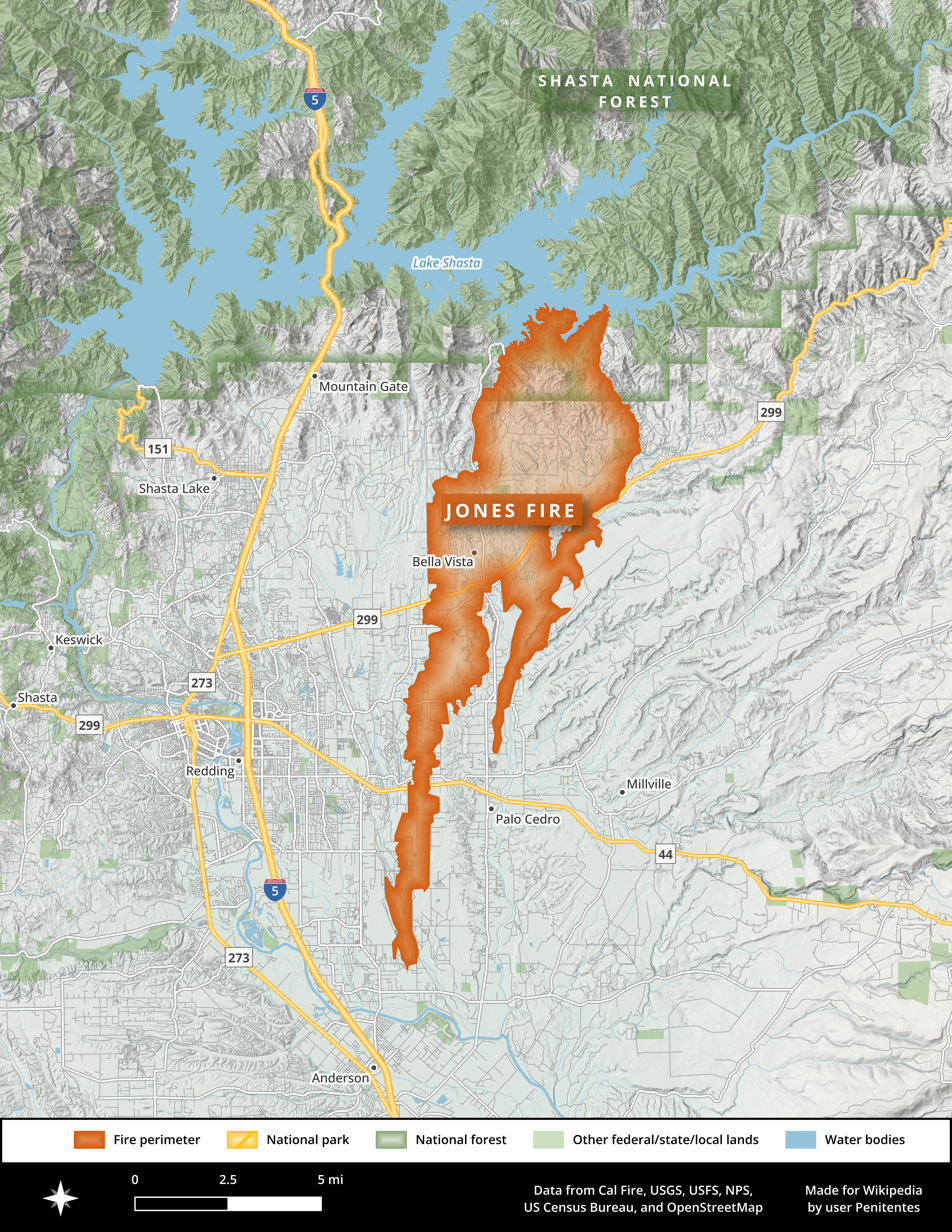
- The final perimeter of the Jones Fire
- Date: October 16 –; October 19, 1999; (4 days)
- Location: Shasta County, Northern California, United States
- Coordinates: 40°41′40″N 122°14′40″W

Statistics
- Burned area: 26,200 acres (10,603 ha; 41 sq mi; 106 km^{2})

Impacts
- Deaths: 1
- Injuries: 5
- Evacuated: ~2,500
- Structures lost: 954 (37 damaged)

Ignition
- Cause: Undetermined

Map
- Location within Northern California

The 1999 Jones Fire was a destructive wildfire in the U.S. state of California's Shasta County. The fire ignited on October 16, and was contained on October 19, 1999. It burned 26,200 acres (10,600 ha), destroyed 954 structures, and resulted in one fatality, becoming the then-second most destructive wildfire ever recorded in California, behind only the Oakland firestorm of 1991. As of 2023 it remains one of the 20 most destructive wildfires in the history of the state. The cause of the fire was never determined.

== Background ==
The Northern California Geographical Coordination Center identifies the weather pattern that fueled the Jones Fire as a typical critical fire weather setup in Northern California, noting that "Post-frontal conditions occur when high pressure following the passage of a cold front causes strong winds from the north and northeast."

== Progression ==
The fire began well before dawn on October 16 at a campsite on Clikapudi Trail between Bear Mountain and Backbone Ridge, east of Jones Valley, close to Shasta Lake. Investigators said it was human-caused and appeared to be accidental. A campfire was ruled out, and alcohol bottles, bullet shells, and cigarette butts were all found at the site.

The Shasta-Trinity Ranger Unit Emergency Command Center received the first report about a vegetation fire in the Jones Valley Resort area at approximately 3:49 a.m. By 4:17 a.m., a half-hour later, the fire had already burned an area of more than 150 acres (61 ha), and was spreading rapidly to the south with multiple spot fires ahead of the main fire front. At this point the command center was already placing mutual aid requests for firefighters locally and regionally to respond and help protect structures in the fire's path.

The fire, driven by hot, dry, winds of 25 miles per hour (40 km/h), burned south in a swath three miles (4.8 km) wide and 20 miles (32 km) long.

The fire was estimated to be 50 percent contained by the evening of October 17, and by October 19 it was 100 percent contained.

== Effects ==
The Jones fire destroyed 954 structures, of which at least 128 were homes and the remainder either commercial structures or outbuildings. A further 37 structures were damaged. The fire damaged electrical infrastructure in the area, leaving many without power until October 19 and necessitating the replacement of 160 power poles.

The fire led to one fatality when a volunteer firefighter from Junction City was struck by a firetruck along Highway 299 while responding to the incident on October 16. Then-Governor of California Gray Davis offered a statement of condolences. A Cal Fire investigation found that the command structure and communication issues were contributing factors in the incident. There were at least five injuries; four belonged to firefighters and one to a Bella Vista woman who was injured while helping her family evacuate, suffering third-degree burns.

== See also ==
- Glossary of wildfire terms
- 1999 Pendola Fire
- 2021 Fawn Fire
