= Fawn Fire =

2021 wildfire in Northern California

- Part of the 2021 California wildfires
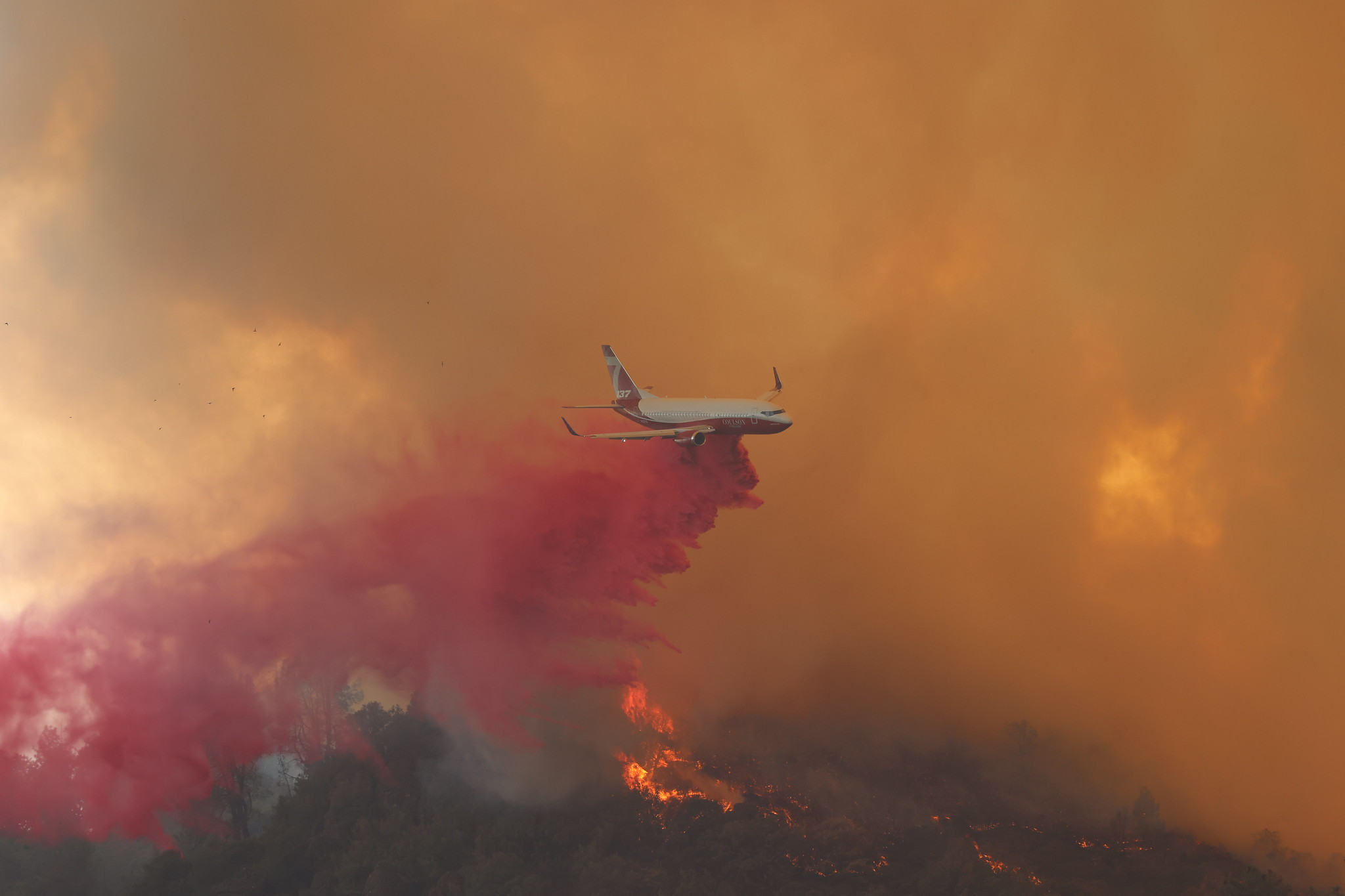
- A Boeing 737-700 airtanker drops fire retardant ahead of the Fawn Fire, September 24, 2021.
- Date: September 22 –; October 2, 2021; (11 days)
- Location: Shasta County, Northern California, United States
- Coordinates: 40.729811°N 122.320243°W

Statistics
- Burned area: 8,578 acres (3,471 ha; 13 sq mi; 35 km^{2})

Impacts
- Injuries: 3
- Evacuated: 4,000+
- Structures destroyed: 185 (26 damaged)
- Cost: $25.6 million; (equivalent to $29.2 million in 2024)

Ignition
- Cause: Arson

Map
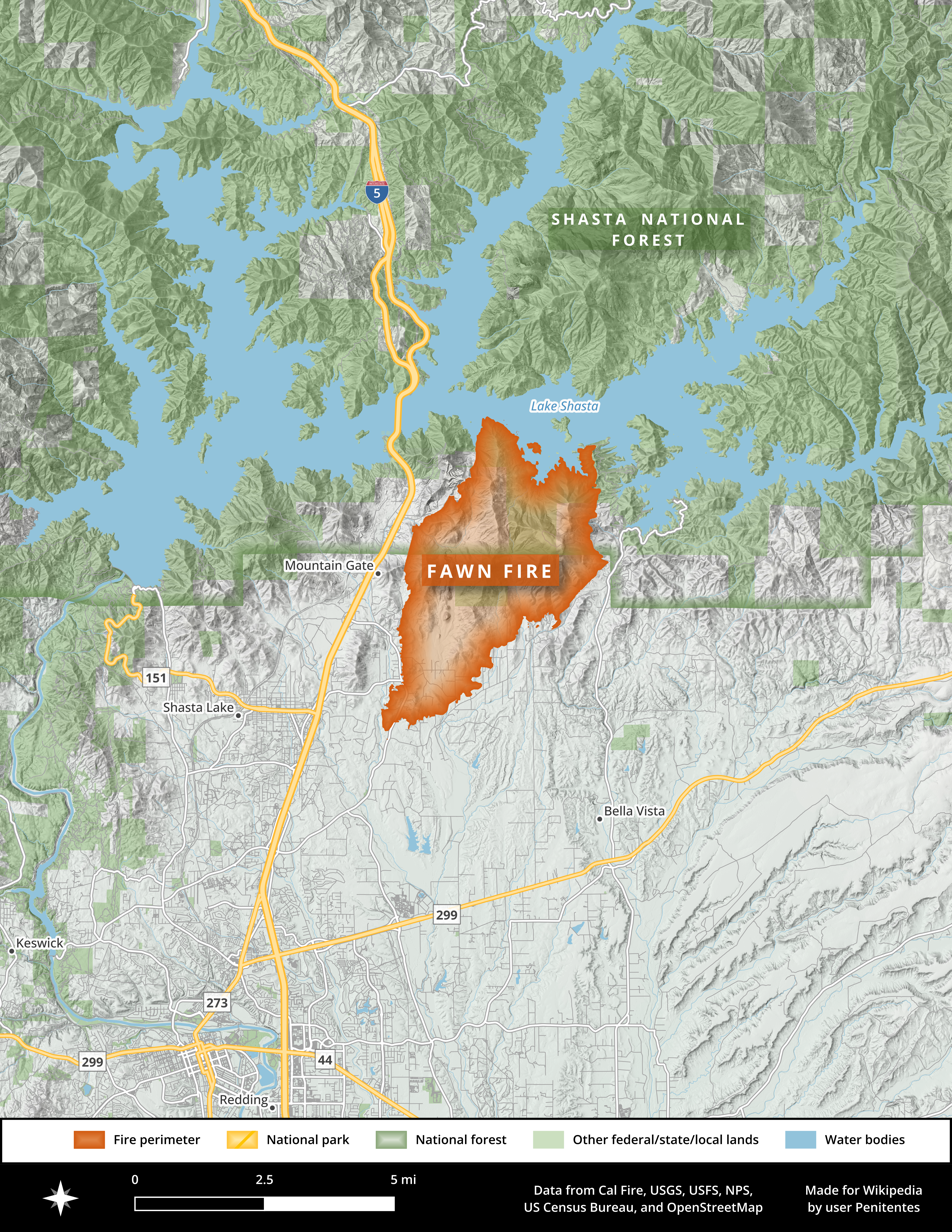
- The footprint of the Fawn Fire, north of Redding and south of Lake Shasta

- Location of the Fawn Fire in Northern California

The Fawn Fire was a destructive wildfire from September 22 to October 2, 2021, in Shasta County near Redding, California, United States. The fire ignited on roads to the north of Mountain Gate and south of Shasta Lake. High winds that night drove the fire south and west into neighborhoods in the wildland–urban interface (WUI), where it destroyed 185 buildings and damaged 26 more.

The Fawn Fire cost $25.6 million (equivalent to $29.2 million in 2024) to contain and suppress, burned 8,578 acres (3,471 hectares), and injured three firefighters. A woman was arrested the day of the Fawn Fire's ignition and charged with arson. As of 2026, legal proceedings regarding the fire's cause are ongoing.

== Background ==
Northern California experienced many large and destructive wildfires in mid-2021, all of them exacerbated by drought and prolonged heat waves such as the 2021 Western North America heat wave. Multiple fires burned in or near Shasta County, including the Salt Fire and the Dixie Fire. The 1999 Jones Fire and the 2004 Bear Fire burned a combined 37,000 acres (14,973 ha) and hundreds of structures in the Jones Valley region to the east of the Fawn Fire's footprint. Other destructive wildfires in the wildland–urban interface (WUI) in and near the Redding area include the 2013 Clover Fire and the 2018 Carr Fire.

== Progression ==
The fire began at approximately 4:45 p.m. Pacific Time Zone (PDT) on September 22, 2021, in an area near Fawndale Road and Radcliff Road, between the community of Mountain Gate to the south and Shasta Lake to the north. At approximately 5:00 p.m., the fire was 20 acres (8 ha) and exhibiting a rapid rate of spread, burning in timber. Later, the fire was 50 acres (20 ha) and zero percent contained. That night, gusty north winds caused the fire to spot and spread rapidly.

By 7:00 a.m. on September 23, the fire was reported as 150 acres (61 ha) and five percent contained. An evacuation order was issued by 9:00 a.m. for all roads off of Bear Mountain Road between Dry Creek and Old Oregon Trail. That morning, the fire was reported as 800 acres (324 ha), and later that day, it was reported as 1,200 acres (486 ha) and five percent contained.

The Fawn Fire's growth was fueled by a combination of high winds with gusts over 20 miles per hour (32 km/h), temperatures as high as 97 °F (36 °C), and relative humidity levels down to 10 percent. According to the Redding Record Searchlight, the wind-driven fire exhibited "extreme" and "explosive" behavior as it moved primarily south and west out of the mountains towards Redding and into brush, oak woodlands, and neighborhoods, threatening more than 2,000 structures.

At least 555 firefighting personnel were engaged on the fire using bulldozers to create firebreaks, water tenders to defend structures and attack spot fires, and over a dozen air tankers and helicopters dropping fire retardant and water in an effort to reduce the intensity and rate of spread of the fire. During the height of the air attack effort on September 23, aircraft dropped 53,000 U.S. gallons (200,000 L) of fire retardant in a 90-minute period. Evacuation warnings and orders continued to expand, eventually covering all areas east of Interstate 5. Winds and fire behavior moderated in the afternoon and evening. By 7:00 p.m., the fire was reported as 5,500 acres (2,226 ha) and five percent contained.

Fawn Fire burning on September 24

On the morning of September 24, the fire was reported as 5,850 acres (2,367 ha) and 10 percent contained, with 9,000 structures threatened and 950 personnel involved in the firefight. The Fawn Fire was rated by the National Interagency Fire Center (NIFC) as the number-one priority wildfire incident in the nation, due to the immediate threat to life and property, as well as reduced resource needs for fires elsewhere in the country. That day, the fire grew by another thousand acres. The day after, the fire was assessed at 7,544 acres (3,053 ha), remaining 10 percent contained. On September 26, the fire was assessed at 8,537 acres (3,455 ha), with 35 percent containment. At this point, during the peak of the fire suppression effort, over 2,000 personnel were assigned to the incident. The fire exhibited minimal growth after this point, and fire crews continued to strengthen containment lines in advance of a red flag warning issued for September 28. Containment slowly increased until the Fawn Fire was declared 100 percent contained at 6:53 p.m. on October 2, 10 days after it began.

== Cause ==
A woman was apprehended after walking out of a wooded area near the fire's ignition point the day it started. According to officials, she told firefighters that she was dehydrated and needed medical care. After receiving it, she was interviewed by the California Department of Forestry and Fire Protection (Cal Fire) law enforcement officers, arrested, and booked into the Shasta County Jail. She was found with an operable lighter, carbon dioxide cartridges, and a "pink and white item containing a green leafy substance". The supervisor of a quarry near both the ignition point and the site of the woman's arrest reported someone of her description trespassing in the area, ignoring warnings to that effect, and leaving a battery and more carbon dioxide cartridges on a dirt road. The woman said she had been unsuccessfully attempting to boil water containing bear urine in a puddle in a creek bed.

Later identified as Alexandra Souverneva of Palo Alto, California, on September 24, 2021, she was charged by the Shasta County District Attorney's office with felony arson to wildland (Cal. Penal Code § 451(C)), with an enhancement because of the declared state of emergency in California (Cal. Penal Code § 454(A)). During her arraignment, Souverneva entered a plea of not guilty. Judge Adam Ryan increased her bail from $100,000 to $175,000 due to the state of emergency and the damage the fire had already caused by that point. In November 2021, Judge Ryan found Souverneva mentally unfit to stand trial and put the prosecution on hold. After undergoing competency training in the custody of the California Department of State Hospitals, in April 2022 Souverneva was found fit to stand trial. If convicted, Souverneva faces up to nine years in California state prison. Souverneva's trial began in May 2026.

== Effects ==
The Fawn Fire burned 8,578 acres (3,471 hectares) over 11 days and cost $25.6 million (equivalent to $29.2 million in 2024) to suppress. The fire destroyed 185 structures, damaged another 26, and forced the evacuation of over 4,000 people. During the fire suppression effort three firefighters were injured; Cal Fire did not disclose the cause or severity of their injuries.

On September 23, the state of California applied for a Fire Management Assistance Grant for the Fawn Fire. The Federal Emergency Management Agency (FEMA) approved it, allowing up to 75 percent of eligible firefighting costs to be covered by federal funding. On September 27, governor of California Gavin Newsom declared a state of emergency for Shasta County in response to the Fawn Fire.

Following the fire, Mercy Medical Center Redding requested the activation and received the assistance of two National Guard medical teams after hospital staffing was compromised by the combined impacts of the Fawn Fire (which affected 30 hospital employees) and the COVID-19 pandemic. The United States Small Business Administration (SBA) provided assistance to businesses and residents in areas impacted by the fire; additional recovery assistance was made available through a Local Assistance Center (LAC) at the Shasta Lake Community Center. Shasta County established an emergency ordinance that temporarily suspended health and safety codes to permit residents to live in temporary housing while seeking permanent housing.

== See also ==
- Delta Fire (a large 2018 wildfire north of Lake Shasta, also caused by arson)
