= 1999 California wildfires =

Series of wildfires in California, US

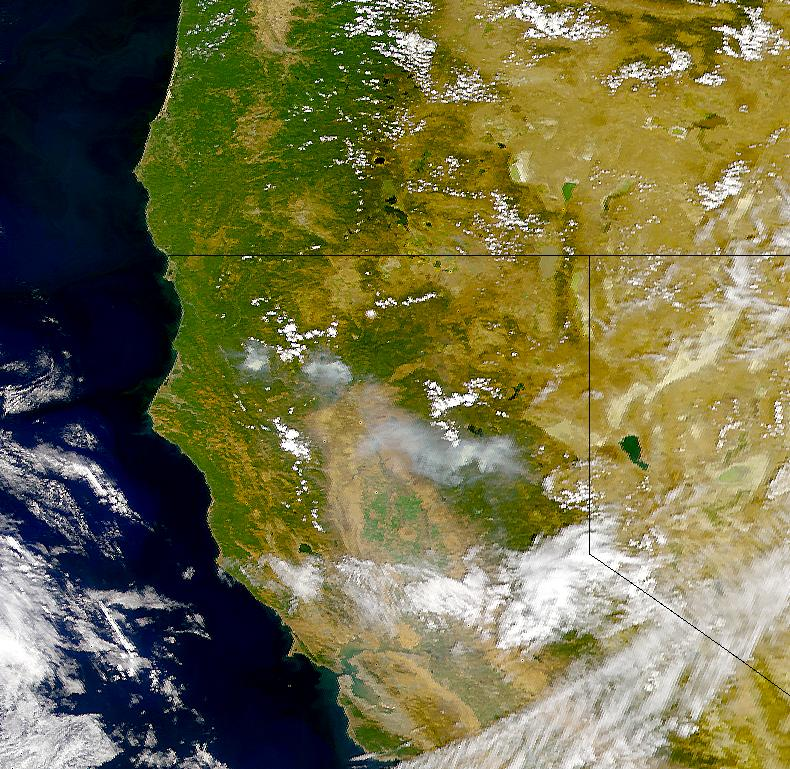
- Satellite image from OrbView-2 on September first 1999 of smoke from several large forest fires blanketed areas of Northern California

Statistics
- Total fires: 11,125
- Total area: 1,172,850 acres 474,640 ha

Impacts
- Deaths: 1
- Structures destroyed: 1000+
- Cost: $100 million +

According to California Department of Forestry and Fire Protection (Cal Fire) statistics, 11,125 wildfires burned a total of 1,172,850 acres (474,640 hectares) in the US state of California in 1999. The 1999 California wildfire season was one of the most destructive fire seasons on record, with the area burned in a season not being surpassed until 2007.

== Background ==
The timing of "fire season" in California is variable, depending on the amount of prior winter and spring precipitation, the frequency and severity of weather such as heat waves and wind events, and moisture content in vegetation. Northern California typically sees wildfire activity between late spring and early fall, peaking in the summer with hotter and drier conditions. Occasional cold frontal passages can bring wind and lightning. The timing of fire season in Southern California is similar, peaking between late spring and fall. The severity and duration of peak activity in either part of the state is modulated in part by weather events: downslope/offshore wind events can lead to critical fire weather, while onshore flow and Pacific weather systems can bring conditions that hamper wildfire growth.

== List of wildfires ==
Below is a list of fires that exceeded 1,000 acres (4.0 km^{2}) or caused a notable amount of damage

Name	County	Acres	Start date	Notes	References
Pendola Fire	Yuba County	11,725 acres	October 16 1999	72 structures destroyed	
Jones Fire	Yuba County	26,200 acres	October 16 1999	954 structures destroyed, 1 death	
Big Bar Complex	Shasta County	117,278 acres	August 1999		
Sixteen Fire	Yolo County	3,200 acres	October 1999		
Geyser Fire	Sonoma County	1,000 acres	October 1999		
Kirk Complex	Ventura County	85,508 acres	October 1999		
Ranch Fire	Ventura County	4,371 acres	December 21 1999	1 structure destroyed	
