= Rumsey Fire =

2004 wildfire in Northern California

- Part of the 2004 California wildfires
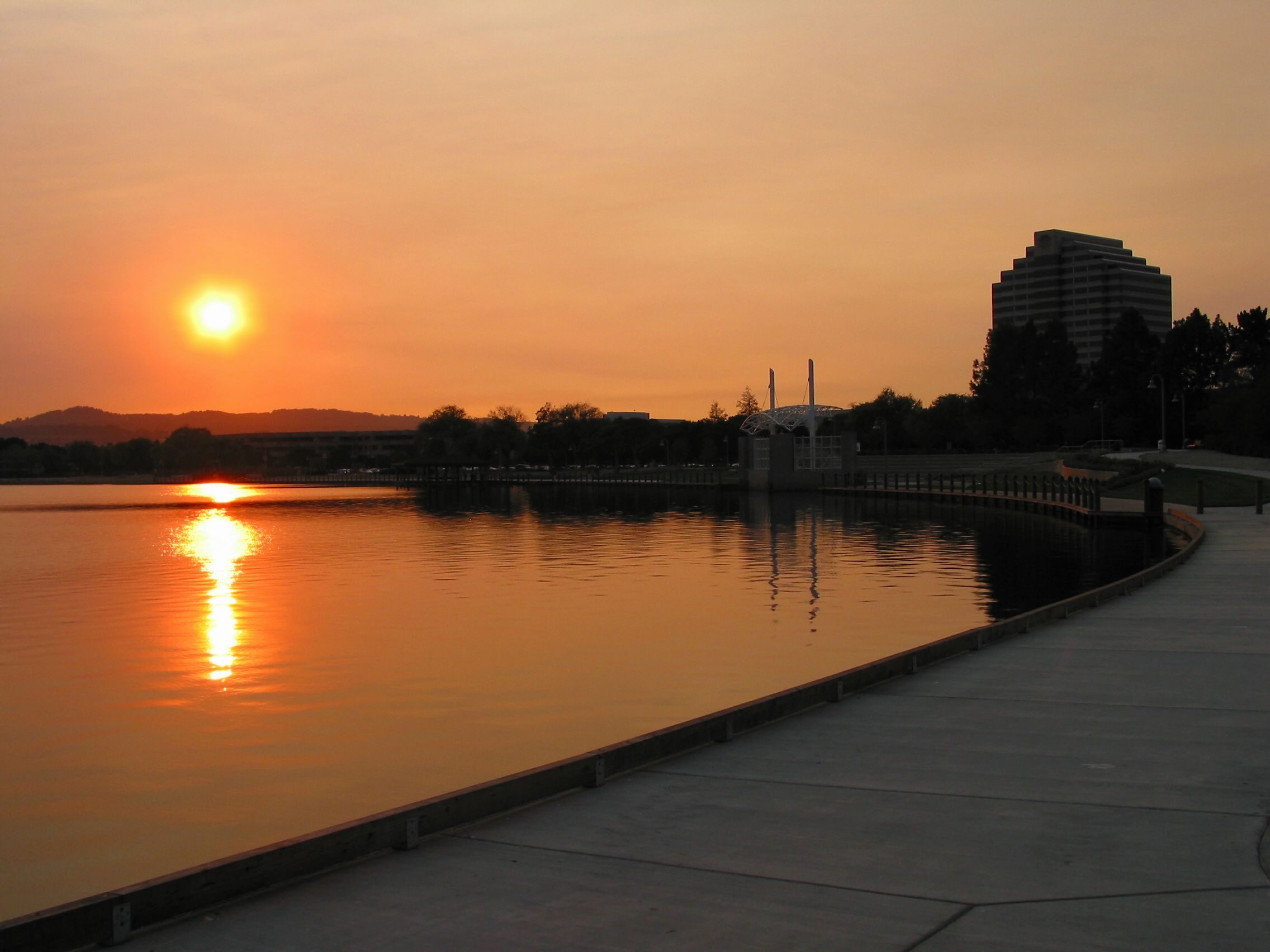
- Smoke from the Rumsey Fire tints the sunset 90 miles to the south
- Date: October 10, 2004 –; October 16, 2004
- Location: Rumsey Canyon, Rumsey, California

Statistics
- Burned area: 39,138 acres (158.39 km^{2})

Impacts
- Deaths: None
- Injuries: 4
- Structures lost: 5
- Cost: $10.3 million

Ignition
- Cause: Arson

The Rumsey Fire in Yolo County, California was the largest fire of the 2004 California wildfire season. The fire burned from October 10 through October 16, 2004 destroying 39,138 acres (158.39 km^{2}) of land. Four days after the fire broke out, officials confirmed that it was the work of an arsonist. Of the structures destroyed by the fire, four were unoccupied mobile homes and the fifth structure was the CAL FIRE Berryessa lookout tower.
