= 2004 California wildfires =

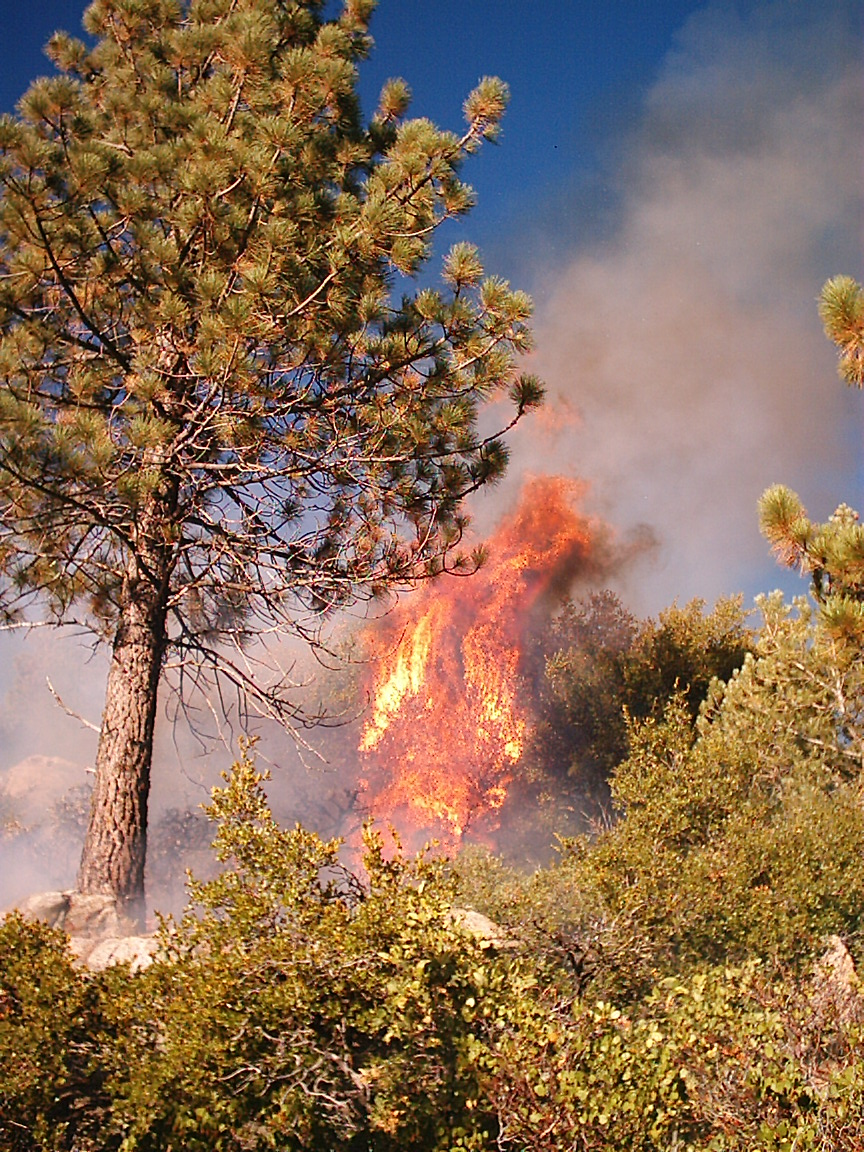
- Manzanita burns in a small 2004 wildfire in Sequoia and Kings Canyon National Parks
- Date: January 1 –; December 31, 2004

Statistics
- Total fires: 7,898
- Total area: 311,024 acres (1,258.67 km^{2})

Impacts
- Deaths: 2 firefighters
- Cost: >$296.9 million (2004 USD)

7,898 wildfires burned 311,024 acres (1,258.67 square kilometres) in the US state of California in 2004.

== Background ==
The timing of "fire season" in California is variable, depending on the amount of prior winter and spring precipitation, the frequency and severity of weather such as heat waves and wind events, and moisture content in vegetation. Northern California typically sees wildfire activity between late spring and early fall, peaking in the summer with hotter and drier conditions. Occasional cold frontal passages can bring wind and lightning. The timing of fire season in Southern California is similar, peaking between late spring and fall. The severity and duration of peak activity in either part of the state is modulated in part by weather events: downslope/offshore wind events can lead to critical fire weather, while onshore flow and Pacific weather systems can bring conditions that hamper wildfire growth.

== List of wildfires ==
Below is a list of all fires that exceeded 1,000 acres (4.0 km^{2}) during the 2004 fire season. The list is taken from CAL FIRE's list of large fires.

| Name | County | Acres | Km^{2} | Start date | Contained Date (Note: Containment means that fire crews have established and secured control lines around the fire's perimeter. These lines are artificial barriers, like trenches or cleared vegetation, designed to stop the fire's spread, or natural barriers like rivers. Containment reflects progress in managing the fire but does not necessarily mean the fire is starved of fuel, under control, or put out.) | Notes |
|---|---|---|---|---|---|---|
| Pleasure Fire | Riverside | 2,464 | 10.0 | April 25, 2004 | April 26, 2004 | |
| India | San Diego | 2,040 | 8.3 | May 2, 2004 | May 3, 2004 | |
| Eagle | Riverside | 8,831 | 35.7 | May 2, 2004 | May 7, 2004 | 41 structures destroyed |
| Cerrito | Riverside | 16,460 | 66.6 | May 3, 2004 | May 7, 2004 | 26 structures destroyed |
| Cachuma | Santa Barbara | 1,127 | 4.6 | May 3, 2004 | May 7, 2004 | 1 structure destroyed |
| Cottonwood | Riverside | 1,845 | 7.5 | May 12, 2004 | May 15, 2004 | |
| Gaviota | Santa Barbara | 7,440 | 30.1 | June 5, 2004 | June 11, 2004 | 4 structures destroyed |
| Meadow | Mariposa | 5,060 | 20.5 | June 27, 2004 | July 1, 2004 | |
| Bluff | Shasta | 3,304 | 13.4 | June 28, 2004 | September 13, 2004 | Burned in Lassen Volcanic National Park |
| Verbenia | Riverside | 3,833 | 15.5 | July 11, 2004 | July 16, 2004 | |
| Gatos | Fresno | 1,307 | 5.3 | July 11, 2004 | July 13, 2004 | |
| Pine | Los Angeles | 17,418 | 70.5 | July 12, 2004 | July 21, 2004 | 15 structures destroyed, 1 firefighter fatality |
| Mataguary | San Diego | 8,649 | 35.0 | July 13, 2004 | July 15, 2004 | 3 structures destroyed |
| State Melton | Riverside | 3,667 | 14.8 | July 17, 2004 | July 20, 2004 | 20 structures destroyed |
| Foothill | Los Angeles | 6,002 | 24.3 | July 17, 2004 | July 21, 2004 | |
| Pelican | Stanislaus | 1,500 | 6.1 | July 19, 2004 | July 24, 2004 | |
| Crown Complex | Los Angeles | 18,026 | 72.9 | July 20, 2004 | July 23, 2004 | 7 structures destroyed |
| Straylor | Lassen | 3,422 | 13.8 | July 22, 2004 | July 29, 2004 | |
| Irongate | Siskiyou | 2,400 | 9.7 | July 24, 2004 | July 26, 2004 | |
| Sims | Trinity | 4,030 | 16.3 | July 28, 2004 | August 3, 2004 | 4 structures destroyed |
| East | Los Angeles | 1,330 | 5.4 | August 7, 2004 | August 9, 2004 | |
| Copper | Calaveras | 3,443 | 13.9 | August 8, 2004 | August 9, 2004 | |
| Kincaid | Santa Clara | 1,246 | 5.0 | August 8, 2004 | August 10, 2004 | |
| Early | Tuolumne | 1,670 | 6.8 | August 9, 2004 | August 11, 2004 | |
| Oregon | Butte | 2,030 | 8.2 | August 11, 2004 | August 15, 2004 | 4 structures destroyed |
| Bear | Shasta | 10,848 | 43.9 | August 11, 2004 | August 16, 2004 | 86 structures destroyed |
| Deep | Tulare | 3,148 | 12.7 | August 12, 2004 | August 16, 2004 | |
| French | Shasta | 13,005 | 52.6 | August 14, 2004 | August 20, 2004 | 30 structures destroyed |
| Geysers | Lake | 12,525 | 50.7 | September 3, 2004 | September 8, 2004 | 21 structures destroyed |
| Pattison | Calaveras | 2,476 | 10.0 | September 3, 2004 | September 5, 2004 | 125 structures destroyed |
| Cement | Napa | 1,100 | 4.5 | September 4, 2004 | September 4, 2004 | |
| Runaway | San Bernardino | 1,007 | 4.1 | September 7, 2004 | September 9, 2004 | |
| Old Highway | Mariposa | 1,347 | 5.5 | September 12, 2004 | September 15, 2004 | |
| Power | Amador | 16,800 | 68.0 | October 6, 2004 | October 21, 2004 | |
| Rumsey | Yolo | 39,138 | 158.4 | October 10, 2004 | October 16, 2004 | 6 structures destroyed |
| Freds | El Dorado | 7,700 | 31.2 | October 13, 2004 | October 17, 2004 | |
