= American College of Bankruptcy =

U.S. professional organizations

The American College of Bankruptcy is a professional organization for bankruptcy judges, lawyers, international fellows, and accountants in the United States. The College is an Honorary public service association of United States and international insolvency professionals that funds projects that improve the quality of bankruptcy law and practice, provides grants for pro bono legal service programs, and maintains the National Bankruptcy Archives.
