= Pendola Fire =

1999 wildfire in Northern California

- Part of the 1999 California wildfires
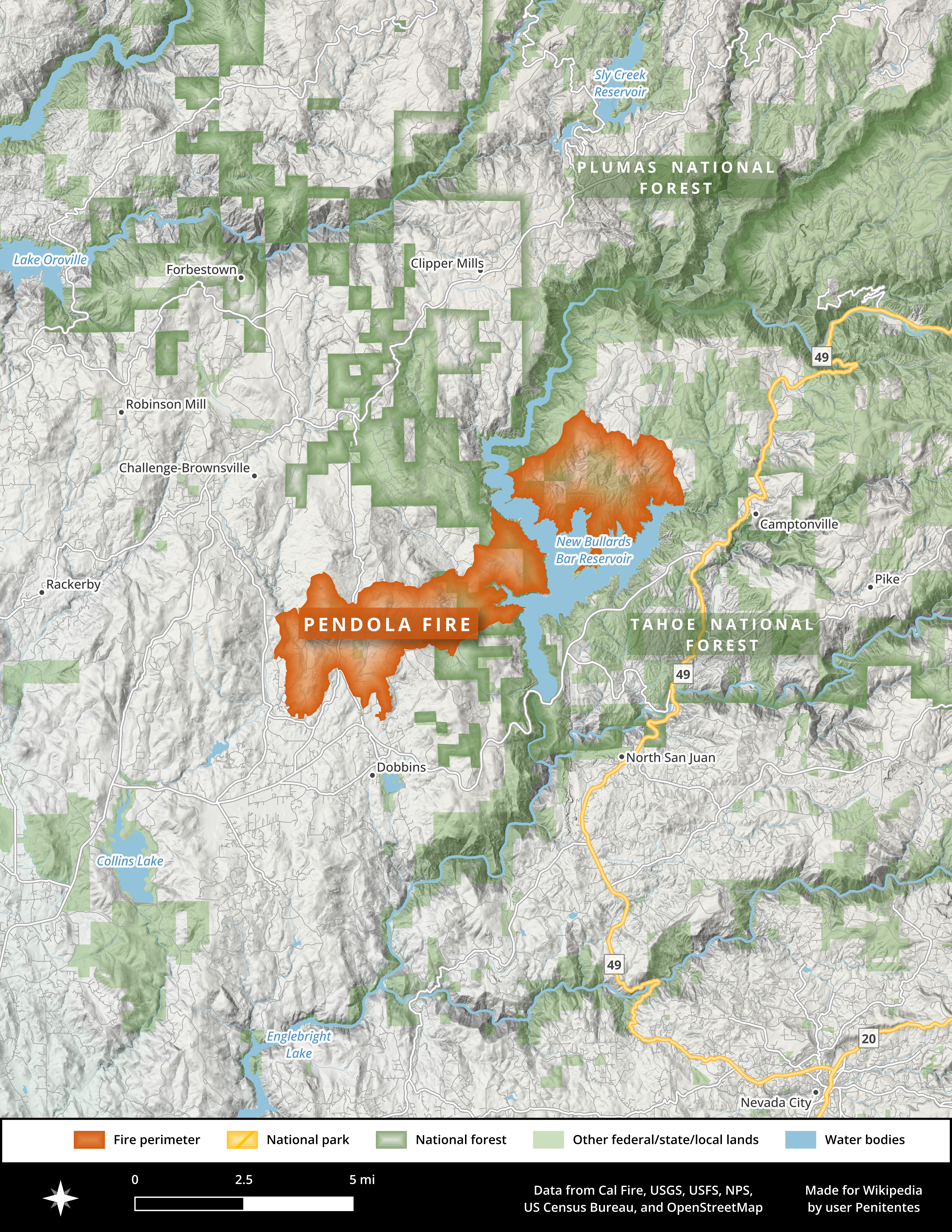
- The extent of the Pendola Fire
- Date: October 16 –; October 23, 1999; (7 days)
- Location: Yuba County, Northern California, United States
- Coordinates: 39.473°N 121.085°W

Statistics
- Burned area: 11,725 acres (4,745 ha; 18 sq mi; 47 km^{2})

Impacts
- Structures destroyed: 72 destroyed, 3 damaged
- Cost: $4.2 million (equivalent to about $7.4 million in 2024) in firefighting costs

Ignition
- Cause: Tree falling into power line

Map
- The general location of the Pendola Fire in Northern California

The Pendola Fire was a large wildfire in Northern California's Yuba County in October 1999. The fire burned for one week, spreading to 11,725 acres (4,745 hectares) and destroying dozens of buildings. The fire was caused by a tree falling on a power line operated by Pacific Gas and Electric Company (PG&E), which ultimately settled with the United States Forest Service and other parties for more than $17.3 million (equivalent to about $30.5 million in 2024).

== Background ==
California's 1999 wildfire season was, at the time, one of the worst on record by acres burned and structures destroyed. Almost 750,000 acres (300,000 ha) burned statewide between the beginning of the year and the official declaration of fire season's closure in Northern California on November 9. Roughly half of the burned acreage was National Forest land, and the remaining area—not quite 274,000 acres (111,000 ha)—was private property or other lands under state firefighting jurisdiction.

By October 18, during the Pendola Fire, approximately 660,000 acres (270,000 ha) had burned throughout California. The Pendola Fire burned simultaneously with several other large wildfires in Northern California, including the Big Bar Complex fires in Trinity County and the Jones Fire in Shasta County.

A red flag warning was issued for the area of the Pendola Fire for the weekend of its ignition on account of high winds. At 4:00 a.m. on Saturday, October 16, 1999, the fire lookout at Oregon Peak reported a wind gust of 50 miles per hour (80 km/h).

== Progression ==
The Pendola Fire began at about 4:30 a.m. on Saturday, October 16, north of New Bullards Bar Reservoir in Yuba County. The fire ignited when high winds blew a 170-foot (52 m) ponderosa pine down onto a PG&E 12-kilovolt power distribution line on a tract of privately owned land in the community of Camptonville. The fire was originally located near Baker Road and Pendola Extension, for which it was named.

The fire quickly burned southwest, and jumped across New Bullards Bar Reservoir at a narrow section south of Madrone Cove. There it continued to burn in forested areas north of Dobbins, spreading to about 2,500 acres (1,000 ha) by nighttime. On Sunday, October 17, the fire burned an additional 3,000 acres (1,200 ha).

By the morning of Monday, October 18, the fire had burned 5,120 acres (2,070 ha) and was 10 percent contained. At 3:00 p.m., residents of Dobbins, Brownsville, and Challenge were able to return home. The fire continued to grow, more than doubling in acreage, and by 8:00 p.m. that night, the fire had burned about 11,000 acres (4,500 ha) and was 65 percent contained.

More than 2,500 firefighters were mobilized to suppress the fire, which was declared controlled by the U.S. Forest Service on Saturday, October 23.

The fire ultimately burned 11,725 acres (4,745 ha), 3,866 acres (1,565 ha) of which were National Forest lands. The effects of the fire on Tahoe National Forest land east of New Bullards Bar Reservoir were mild, akin to the effects of a prescribed fire. The cost of the firefighting effort came to $4.2 million (equivalent to about $7.4 million in 2024). The area burned in the Pendola Fire overlapped with the area burned by the destructive 5,743-acre (2,324 ha) Williams Fire in September 1997.

== Effects ==
The Pendola Fire destroyed 72 buildings comprising 13 homes, two commercial buildings, and 57 other structures. Forty-four vehicles were also destroyed, per Forest Service statistics reported by The Union. One additional home and two other structures were damaged. A member of Nevada County's Fire Safe Council said that all of the burned homes had no brush clearance.

On October 18 the Northern Sierra Air Quality Management District issued an advisory, warning at-risk people to stay indoors because of smoke impacts to air quality.

In December 1999 the Tahoe National Forest proposed salvage logging operations in the approximately 2,600-acre (1,100 ha) portion of the forest that had burned in the Pendola Fire. Timber companies eventually extracted 18.5 million board-feet of timber from the area, paying over $2 million (equivalent to about $3.3 million in 2024) for the right to do so. Approximately $235,000 of the taxed money went towards reforestation.

== Litigation and settlements ==
After the fire, the Forest Service alleged that PG&E or its contractors should have inspected the power line and removed the ponderosa pine tree that had fallen and caused the Pendola Fire before it did so.

PG&E was sued by multiple parties in Yuba County Superior Court for the company's role in the Pendola Fire. Property owners filed lawsuits in October 2001 and October 2002, and timber company CHY Co. filed a suit for $4.6 million in damages in October 2002 after 2,000 acres (810 ha) of their land burned in the fire. PG&E settled with one of the groups of property owners for $800,000, and settled with CHY Co. in 2005 for $1.8 million (equivalent to about $2.8 million in 2024).

In 2009, PG&E settled with the Forest Service for $14.75 million (equivalent to about $20.9 million in 2024), including more than $10 million in "compensation for natural resources damage". There was no litigation; the settlement was reached through mediation. The settlement with PG&E was the second-largest ever for a wildfire case in the United States, after the federal government obtained a settlement with Union Pacific Railroad Company in 2008 for $102 million (equivalent to about $145.5 million in 2024) over the Storrie Fire in 2000.

== See also ==
- Glossary of wildfire terms
- List of California wildfires
- 1988 49er Fire
- 2001 Poe Fire
