= Rim Fire =

2013 wildfire in Central California

- Part of the 2013 California wildfires
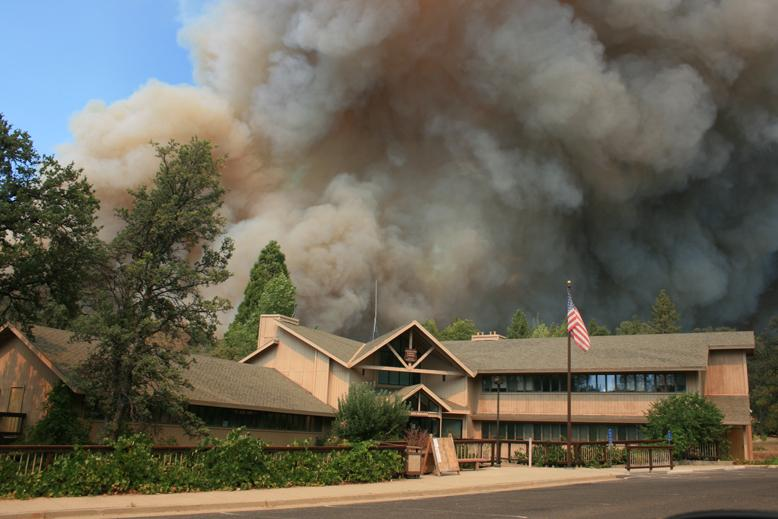
- The fire nearing the Groveland Ranger Station in the Stanislaus National Forest
- Date: August 17 –; September 6, 2013; (21 days)
- Location: Sierra Nevada, California
- Coordinates: 37°51′N 120°5′W

Statistics
- Burned area: 257,314 acres (104,131 ha; 402 sq mi; 1,041 km^{2})

Impacts
- Deaths: 0
- Injuries: 10
- Structures destroyed: 11 residences; 3 commercial; 98 outbuildings
- Cost: $127.35 million; (equivalent to about $168.6 million in 2024)

Ignition
- Cause: Illegal camping fire

Map
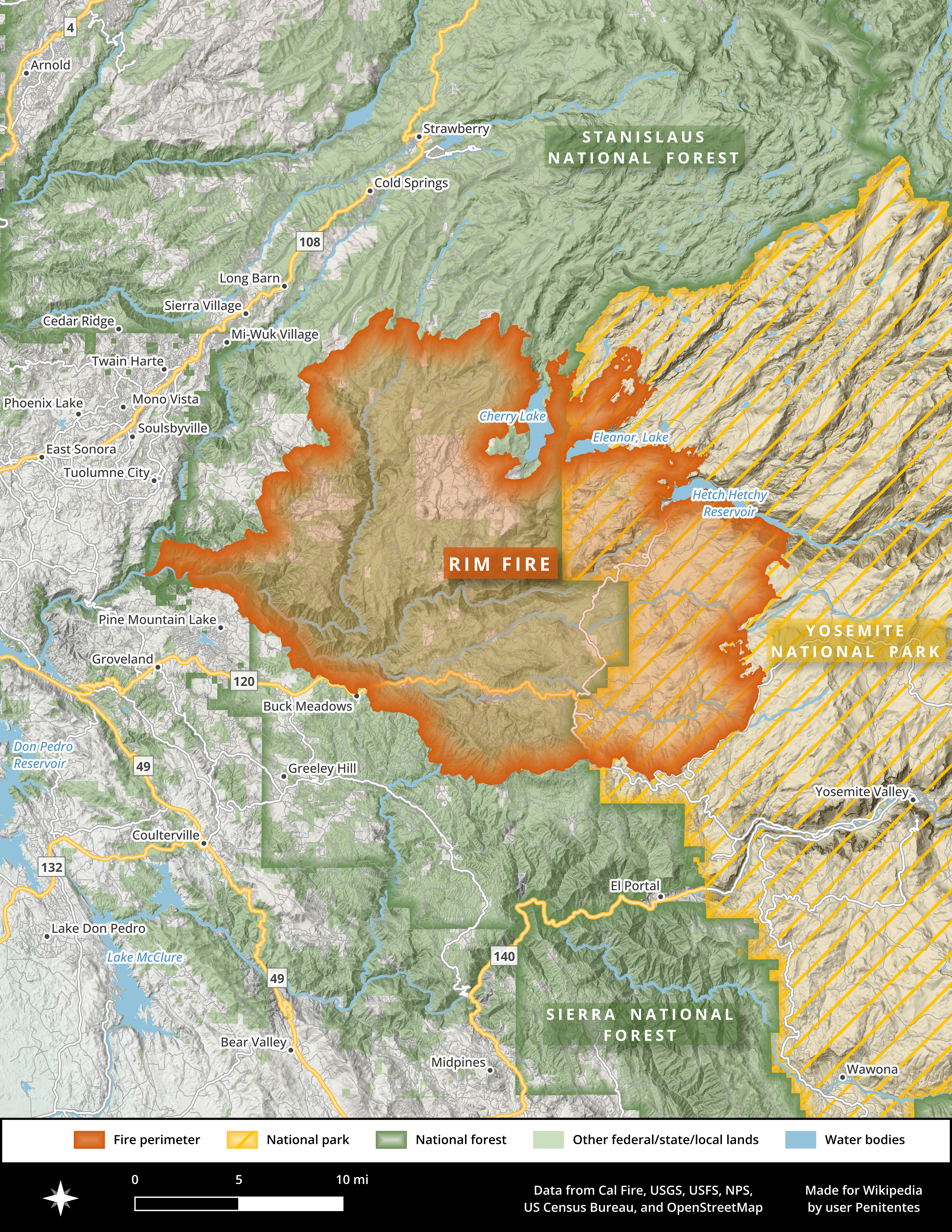
- The Rim Fire burned primarily in the Stanislaus National Forest and Yosemite National Park.

- The general location of the Rim Fire within California

The Rim Fire was a massive wildfire that started in a remote canyon in the Stanislaus National Forest in California's Tuolumne County. The fire ignited on August 17, 2013, amid the 2013 California wildfire season, and burned 257,314 acres (402 sq mi; 104,131 ha; 1,041 km^{2}) in largely remote areas of the Sierra Nevada, including a large portion of Yosemite National Park. The Rim Fire was fully contained on Thursday, October 24, 2013, after a nine-week suppression effort by firefighters. Due to a lack of winter rains, some logs smoldered in the interior portion of the fire footprint throughout the winter, and more than a year passed before the fire was declared extinguished in November 2014.

The fire was caused by a hunter's illegal fire that got out of control, and it was named for its proximity to the Rim of the World vista point, a scenic overlook on Highway 120 leading up to Yosemite. A total of 112 structures—largely outbuildings—were destroyed in the fire. During suppression efforts, which cost more than $127 million (2013 USD), a total of ten injuries from the wildfire were reported, but there were no fatalities. The Rim Fire grew to be (at the time) the third-largest wildfire in California's recorded history and the largest recorded in the Sierra Nevada. As of 2023, the Rim Fire was California's 11th-largest recorded wildfire.

== Background ==
=== Land management ===
Parts of what became the footprint of the Rim Fire had accumulated large amounts of combustible vegetation and other fuels following decades of wildfire suppression and logging of larger, older, and more fire-resistant trees. Following a series of large wildfires in 1987, thousands of acres in the Stanislaus National Forest had been replanted with pine tree plantations, which—un-thinned and uniform in size—became fuel for the Rim Fire.

=== Climate and weather ===
The fire's rapid spread was linked to the extreme drought and unstable weather conditions. In the winter and spring of 2012–2013, California received below-normal amounts of precipitation: less than half of the average for the eight months directly prior to the fire. As a result, drought conditions prevailed over the region, bringing vegetation moisture to very low levels.

== Progression ==
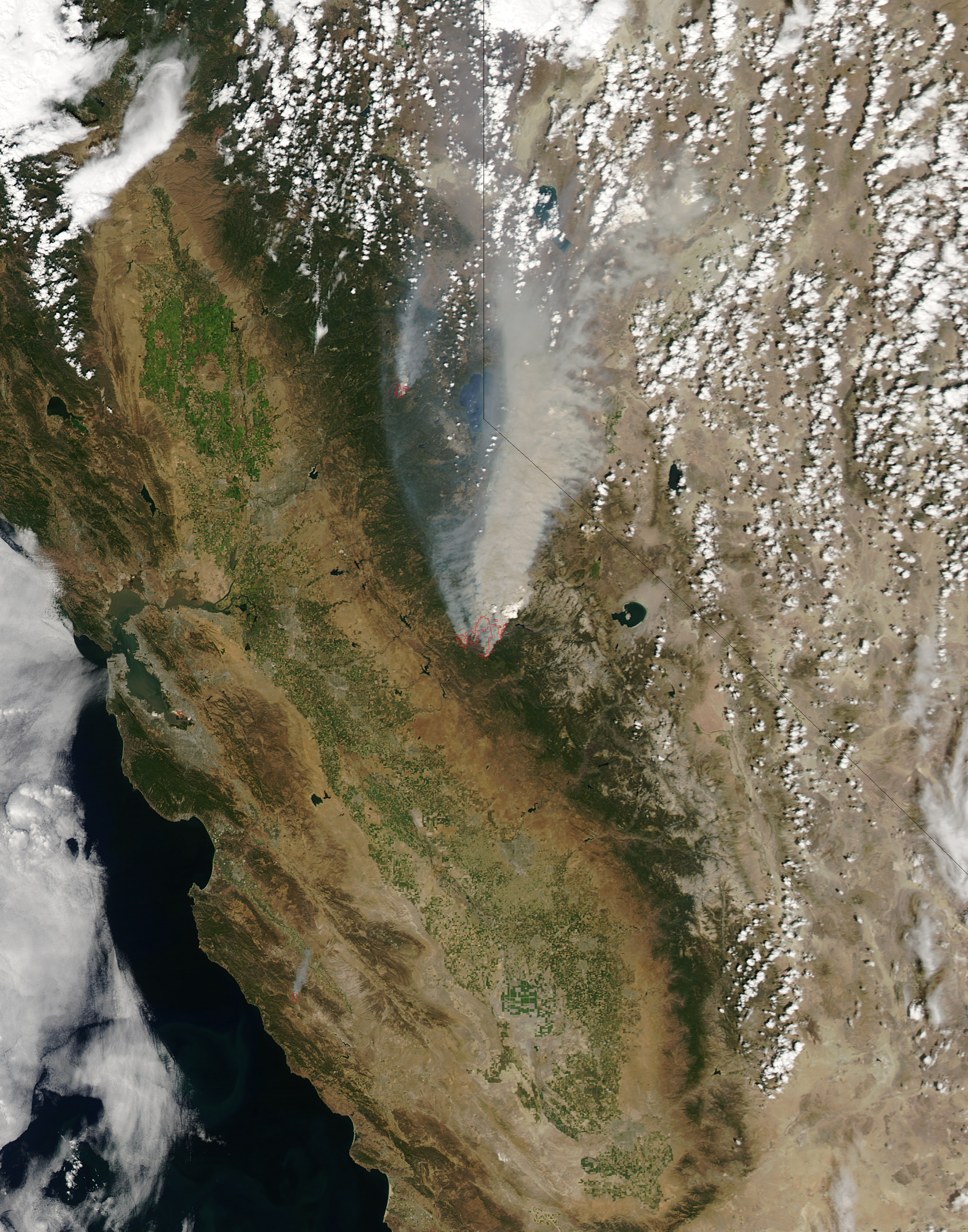
A satellite image of the Rim Fire on August 23, 2013 (the American Fire is also visible to the north)

=== August 17 ===
The weather on the day of the Rim Fire's ignition, August 17, 2013, was "hot, dry and windy". A nearby weather station reported at 3:00 p.m. that the temperature was 87 °F (31 °C), the relative humidity was 17 percent, and winds were reaching 15–21 miles per hour (24–34 km/h) out of the west.

The Rim Fire was first spotted by a passing aircraft at 3:25 p.m. PDT, becoming the third fire in the Stanislaus National Forest of the day. It had ignited at the bottom of a canyon, near the confluence of the Tuolumne River and the Clavey River, below the Rim of the World vista lookout off Highway 120—from which the fire received its name. Firefighters quickly assessed the Rim Fire as having burned 40 acres (16 ha) while still growing at a "dangerous rate of spread". An air tanker reached the fire scene by 3:47 p.m. and began dropping fire retardant. By 4:00 p.m., thirty-five minutes after the Rim Fire's discovery, it had burned 150 acres (61 ha) and was starting spot fires one-quarter mile (0.40 km) ahead of the main flame front. The incident command determined that it was too dangerous to have personnel fight the fire directly in the steep Clavey River canyon, opting instead to fight the fire indirectly. Air tankers dropped more than 32,000 gallons of fire retardant in their first four and a half hours of operation on the Rim Fire.

=== August 18–September 6 ===
The fire grew to 10,000 acres within 36 hours and 100,000 acres after just four days. During a two-day period in mid-August, the fire burned nearly 90,000 acres. It burned into backcountry areas of Yosemite National Park. The park remained open, and though Yosemite Valley was never in danger, the fire burned 78,895 acres inside the park's boundaries.

On August 28, after emergency approvals, an MQ-1 Predator unmanned aerial vehicle flew over the area, providing infrared video of lurking fires.

The blaze was difficult to fight because of inaccessible terrain and erratic winds, forcing firefighters to be reactive instead of proactive. More than 5,000 firefighters–including more than 650 inmates who volunteered as part of California's "Conservation Camp initiative"–worked to contain the fire. At one point, state officials asked residents to avoid social media, to stop exaggerated claims and rumors from spreading, and debunked a number of circulating stories.

On September 6, 2013, the Rim Fire was contained. The fire's final burned acreage reached 257,314 acres (104,131 ha). Hotspots within the fire's perimeter continued to burn for almost another year before the Rim Fire was finally declared extinguished on November 4, 2014. The fire suppression effort cost more than $127 million, and at its peak involved more than 5,100 personnel.

When it occurred, the Rim Fire was the third-largest wildfire ever recorded in California (after the Cedar Fire in 2003 and the Rush Fire in 2012), and the largest ever in the Sierra Nevada. As of 2024, the Rim Fire persisted as one of California's largest recorded wildfires but had slipped from third to twelfth place. It remains the largest wildfire in the history of Yosemite National Park.

== Legal proceedings ==
The camper who allegedly started the campfire that became the Rim Fire was not identified publicly until a year after the fire, when two felony and two misdemeanor charges were filed against Keith Matthew Emerald of Columbia, California. The charges against Emerald were dropped in 2015 when two key witnesses died.

== Effects ==
The Rim Fire destroyed 112 structures, including eleven residences, three commercial structures, and 98 outbuildings.

California governor Jerry Brown declared a state of emergency for the city of San Francisco on August 23, after the fire caused damage to the power infrastructure serving the Bay Area, causing two out of the existing three hydroelectric power plants to shut down. The fire also threatened the Hetch Hetchy reservoir, the main source of water for San Francisco, providing up to 85% of the city's supply to 2.6 million customers. On August 26, the San Francisco Public Utilities Commission moved water away from Hetch Hetchy into downstream reservoirs located in San Mateo and Alameda Counties as a precautionary measure but did not expect the fire to cause any disruption to the city's water supply. The fire advanced to within a mile of Hetch Hetchy by Monday, August 26, which was a concern to O'Shaughnessy Dam officials due to ash falling in the water.

The cost of fighting the fire was estimated at $127.35 million as of October 24, 2014. The Federal Emergency Management Agency announced that it would reimburse the state up to 75% of the eligible costs of fighting the fire through a grant for "managing, mitigating, and controlling the fire".

=== Closures and evacuations ===
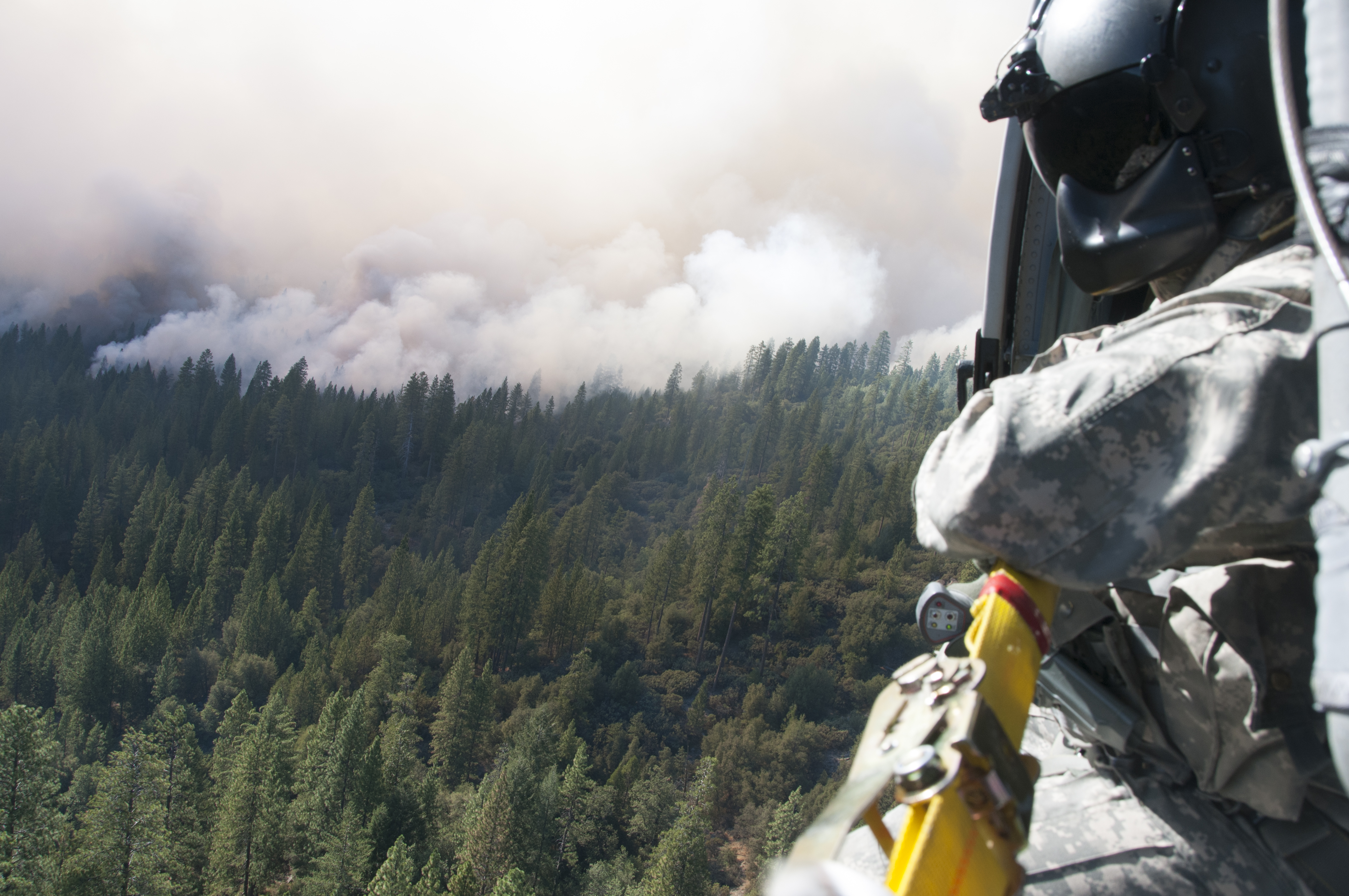
California Army National Guard's 1–140th Aviation Battalion at the Rim Fire near Yosemite, August 22

During the Rim Fire, forest closures were put into effect and evacuation orders were issued by the Tuolumne and Mariposa County Sheriff's Offices. Several thousand people left their homes temporarily as a result of the evacuations. The Tioga Pass Road (Highway 120) was closed for a time. Highways 140 from Merced and 41 from Fresno remained open throughout the fire, providing access to the national park. Law Enforcement Command Posts were set up in the communities of Groveland and Tuolumne City, with hundreds of local and mutual aid Law Enforcement Officers from dozens of agencies responding to assist in evacuations, patrols, and road closures in the affected areas. The event is credited for being the single largest Law Enforcement mutual aid event in the history of the California Law Enforcement Mutual Aid System. At the height of the danger, an estimated 15,000 residents were under evacuation order or advisory, with plans drafted by a Search & Rescue Incident Management Team to evacuate the communities of Groveland, Pine Mountain Lake, Big Oak Flat, Tuolumne City, Tuolumne Rancheria, Ponderosa Hills, Sherwood Forest, Sugar Pine, and Miwuk Village. Several commendations and citations were issued by the county and state for these efforts to the Tuolumne County Sheriff's SAR Team, SAR Field Training Officer Jonathan Rodriguez, and Volunteer Tornado Paul Carlson.

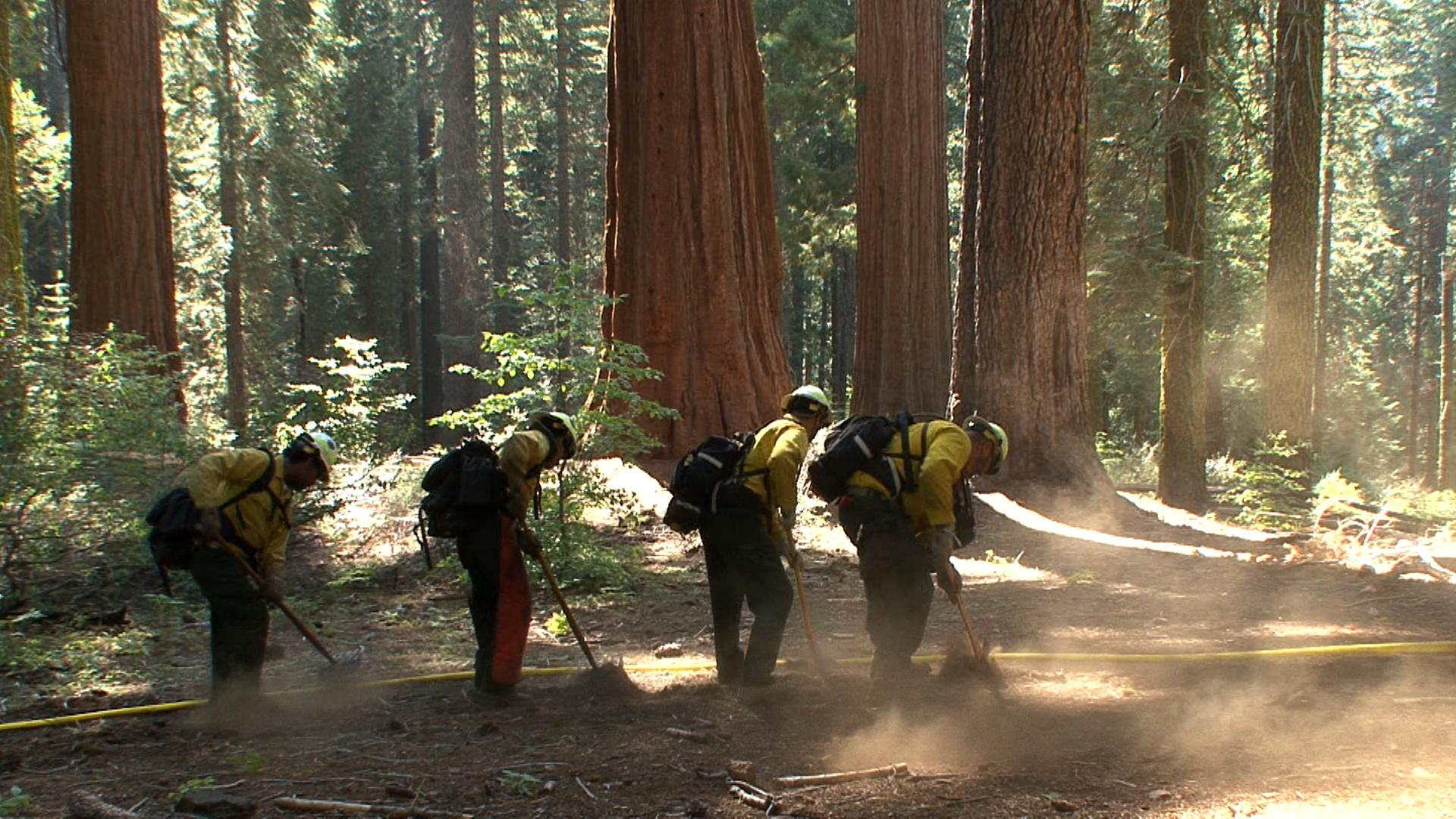
Giant sequoias tower over National Park Service fire crews as they establish hand line in the Merced and Tuolumne Groves to protect the trees from the Rim Fire.

On April 17, 2014, Stanislaus National Forest issued an order closing the majority of the burn area to the public through November 18, 2014, citing safety issues from potential falls of heavily burned trees, rockfalls, and uneven ground. The decision was met with disappointment by morel mushroom hunters who had looked forward to extensive post-fire fruiting of this highly sought-after mushroom. The safety rationale was questioned, as Yosemite National Park, which largely prohibits mushroom collecting, had opened up the burn areas within its boundaries to the public earlier in the month. Some mushroom hunters stated that they would be willing to sign liability waivers in order to enter the area, but the Forest Service rejected this idea, stating they were ultimately responsible for the safety of those entering the area. Extensive harvesting of morels in the Rim Fire area nevertheless took place in May 2014, in a few cases legally by special permit, but in most cases through illegal harvesting. The closure of the burn area was also criticized by the Tuolumne County Board of Supervisors for, among other reasons, causing the cancellation of grazing allotments by local ranchers.

Affected areas of Yosemite National Park reopened on April 2, 2014.

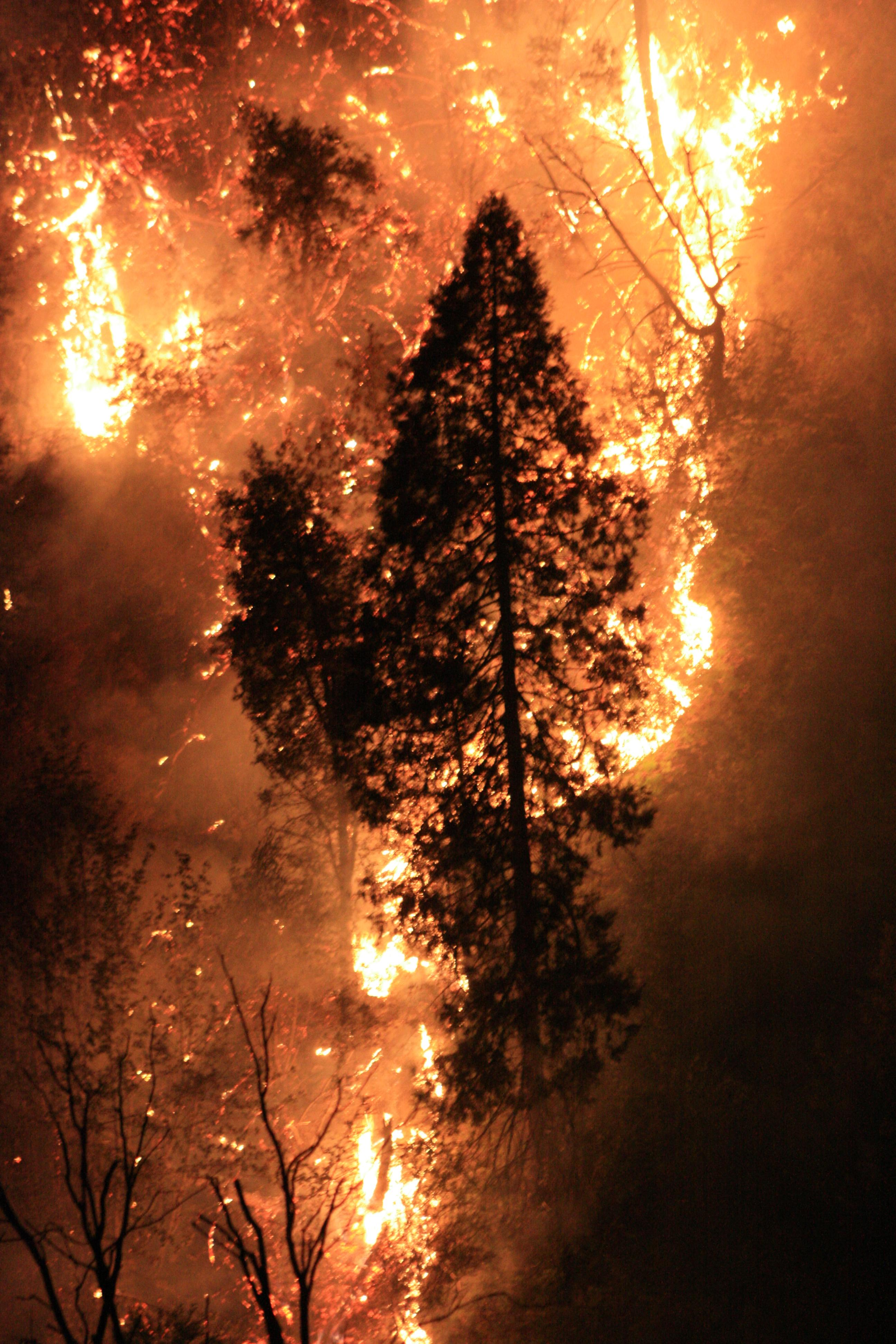
About one-third of the fire burned at high severity, as is typical of mixed-severity forest fires.

=== Environmental impacts ===
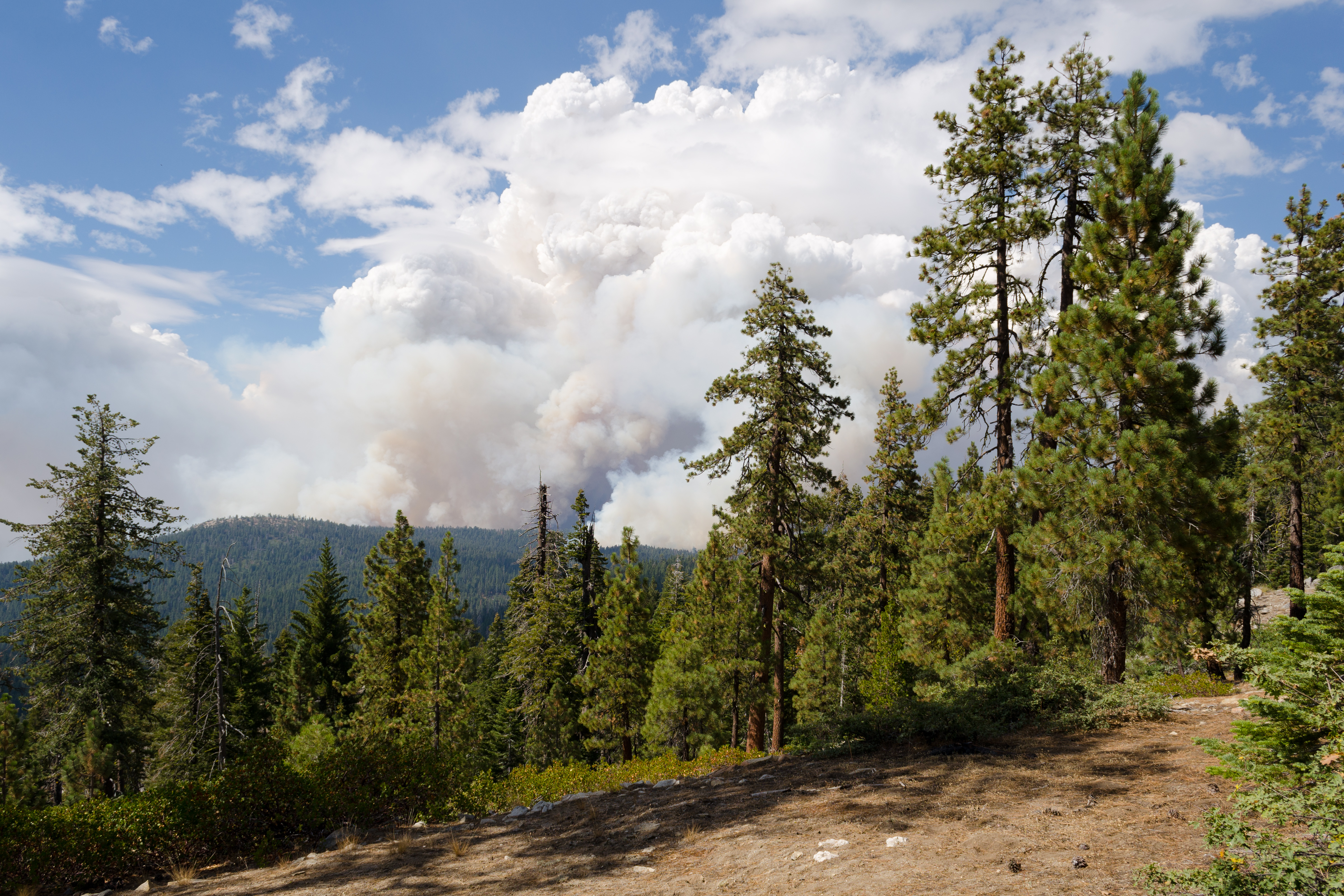
The fire as viewed from the Tioga Road on August 27

The United States Forest Service made it their highest priority fire at the time because of the threat to local communities and its proximity to Yosemite National Park. Though giant sequoia trees—some of the biggest and oldest living things on Earth—are very fire-tolerant and need fire to reproduce, concerns rose as the fire approached them. Park officials set up sprinklers to help protect nearby sequoia trees, but the sprinklers were later removed and careful low-intensity prescribed burns were used. Parts of the National Forest are used for grazing, and the blaze impacted 6 of 14 grazing allotments located within the fire perimeter where displaced cattle were scattered over a wide area. Smoke from the fire caused unhealthy air conditions in Reno, Nevada, and the Lake Tahoe area during the first week of the fire, forcing the cancellation of several outdoor events. Schoolchildren were sent home due to smoky conditions as well. From Yosemite to the San Joaquin Valley, air quality reached unhealthy levels several times, according to the National Weather Service. Berkeley Tuolumne Camp, a family camp operated by the city of Berkeley, established in 1922, was burned to the ground. Nearby Camp Tawonga suffered some damage, including the loss of three buildings. Camp Mather, operated by the city of San Francisco, suffered minor damage, as did the San Jose Camp run by the city of San Jose. During Labor Day weekend, parts of Yosemite National Park are filled with thick smoke, pushing air quality indices to unhealthy levels and obscuring views.

== Aftermath ==
=== Post-fire science ===
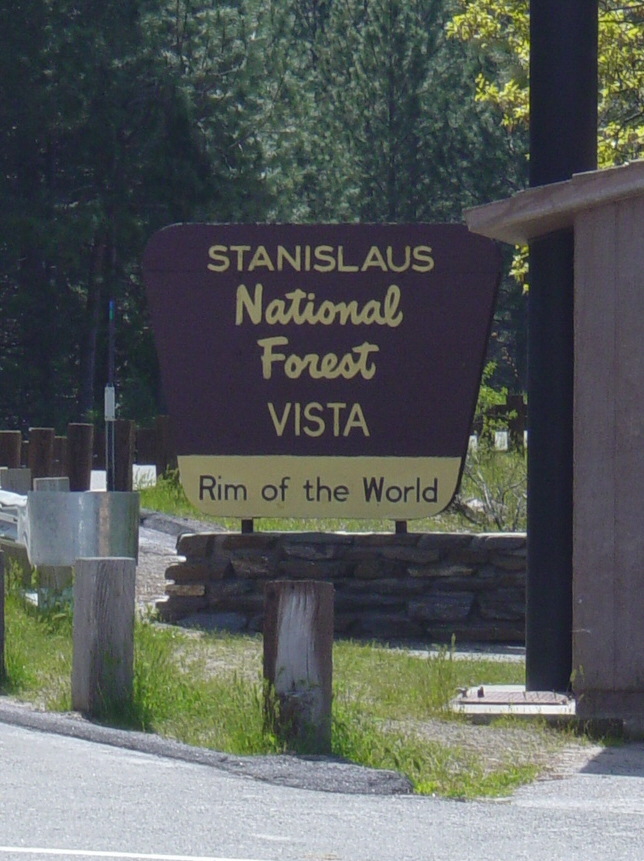
The Rim Fire of 2013 was named after the Stanislaus National Forest's Rim of the World vista point.

The Forest Service and other scientists are currently studying the biological effects from the fire. There were 45 California spotted owl breeding sites within the Rim Fire perimeter on Forest Service land, and one year post-fire, they had the highest-ever recorded occupancy rate for California spotted owls. Spotted owl sites with 100% high-severity burn were occupied by pairs at the same rate as unburned sites. The Rim Fire contains many populations of rare California endemic flowers, such as Clarkia australis and Clarkia biloba ssp. australis, in places where plantation trees burned; these areas, however, are to be disturbed by planned thinning. Researchers estimate that the Rim Fire burned nearly one-fifth of known great gray owl nesting sites, but post-fire surveys found no significant difference in owl detection at burned versus unburned sites. A study of how pre-fire forest conditions affected fire severity found that weather, time since the last fire, and shrub cover had strong positive associations with fire severity and that under extreme weather conditions, as is often the case with fires that escape the initial attack, large areas of the high-severity fire are created even in fuels-reduced forests with restored fire regimes.

=== Forest Service recovery and reforestation projects ===
In late 2013, a plan was proposed for salvage logging approximately 30,000 acres (120 km^{2}) of the Rim Fire. The snag forest habitat of forest-killed trees is home to a wide variety of wildlife, some of which are management indicator species. Many scientists and conservation groups opposed the logging plan, contending that the removal of trees from this area would harm species such as black-backed woodpeckers and affect other cavity-nesting birds that follow in the wake of the woodpeckers. Other species of wildlife were also considered to be at risk from salvage logging, such as frogs that inhabit forested streams and deer. Native plants and the basic ecological succession of the forest are also reportedly harmed by salvage logging. However, some environmental groups endorsed the salvage logging plan.

On August 28, 2014, Stanislaus Forest supervisor Susan Skalski signed a Record of Decision approving the Rim Fire Recovery Project. The plan allowed logging within an area of 52 square miles (130 km^{2}), including interior portions of the burned area and along roadways. Its goals were to: "Salvage dead trees to capture economic value; remove roadside hazard trees to protect public and worker safety; reduce fuels for future forest resiliency; improve roads for hydrologic function; and enhance wildlife habitat. A portion of the money captured from the salvage logging was earmarked for additional projects following the fire." The plan attempted to balance competing interests. Instead of the 660 million board feet initially proposed for logging, the final plan included salvage logging of 210 million board feet. The plan left small areas untouched as snag habitats for Black-Backed Woodpeckers and other snag-dependent wildlife. Instead of building permanent new roads, the plan eliminated permanent new road construction and reduced the mileage of temporary roads as part of the salvage logging plan. The Forest Service said that the final plan reflected a collaboration between the timber industry and various environmental groups, who had joined in an attempt to find consensus on the recovery process. Skalski cited that collaborative agreement as being influential in her decision to significantly reduce the amount of salvage material. Forestry officials praised the plan, but some environmental groups denounced it.

In August 2016, Stanislaus Forest supervisor Jeanne M. Higgins signed a Record of Decision approving the Rim Fire Reforestation Project.

== Growth and containment ==
The table below shows how the fire grew in size and containment during August and September in 2013. Acreage reflects, where possible, the figure reported in the daily morning update on InciWeb. Statistics were not available for some days.

Fire containment status Gray: contained; Red: active; %: percent contained
Date	Total area burned	Personnel	Containment
Aug 17	...	...	...
Aug 18	...	...	...
Aug 19	...	...	...
Aug 20	10,170 acres (4,116 ha)	455 personnel	
Aug 21	16,228 acres (6,567 ha)	858 personnel	
Aug 22	53,866 acres (21,799 ha)	1,356 personnel	
Aug 23	105,620 acres (42,743 ha)	2,011 personnel	
Aug 24	125,620 acres (50,837 ha)	2,672 personnel	
Aug 25	133,980 acres (54,220 ha)	2,846 personnel	
Aug 26	149,780 acres (60,614 ha)	3,678 personnel	
Aug 27	179,481 acres (72,633 ha)	3,752 personnel	
Aug 28	...	...	....
Aug 29	...	...	....
Aug 30	201,894 acres (81,704 ha)	4,931 personnel	
Aug 31	...	...	....
Sep 1	...	...	....
Sep 2	228,670 acres (92,539 ha)	4,616 personnel	
Sep 3	235,841 acres (95,441 ha)	...	
Sep 4	237,341 acres (96,048 ha)	4,143 personnel	
Sep 5	237,341 acres (96,048 ha)	3,975 personnel	
Sep 6	246,350 acres (99,694 ha)	3,634 personnel	
Sep 7	252,156 acres (102,044 ha)	3,457 personnel	
Sep 8	253,332 acres (102,520 ha)	3,312 personnel	
Sep 9	253,332 acres (102,520 ha)	3,104 personnel	
Sep 10	254,685 acres (103,067 ha)	3,027 personnel	
Sep 11	255,146 acres (103,254 ha)	2,735 personnel	
Sep 12	255,560 acres (103,421 ha)	2,764 personnel	
Sep 13	255,858 acres (103,542 ha)	2,572 personnel	
Sep 14	255,858 acres (103,542 ha)	2,170 personnel	
Sep 15	255,858 acres (103,542 ha)	1,935 personnel	
Sep 16	256,169 acres (103,668 ha)	1,791 personnel	
Sep 17	256,528 acres (103,813 ha)	1,540 personnel	
...	...	...	...
Sep 26	257,134 acres (104,058 ha)	733 personnel	
Sep 27	257,135 acres (104,059 ha)	595 personnel	
...	...	...	...
Oct 25	257,314 acres (104,131 ha)	42 personnel	

== See also ==
- Climate change in California
- List of California wildfires
