= Summit Fire =

Gap Fire may refer to:

- Summit Tunnel Fire - A 1984 train fire in the Summit Tunnel on the Greater Manchester/West Yorkshire border.
- Summit Fire (2008) - A 2008 wildfire in the Santa Cruz Mountains
- Summit Fire (2013) - A 2013 wildfire in Riverside County
