= Powerhouse Fire =

2013 wildfire in Southern California

- Part of the 2013 California wildfires
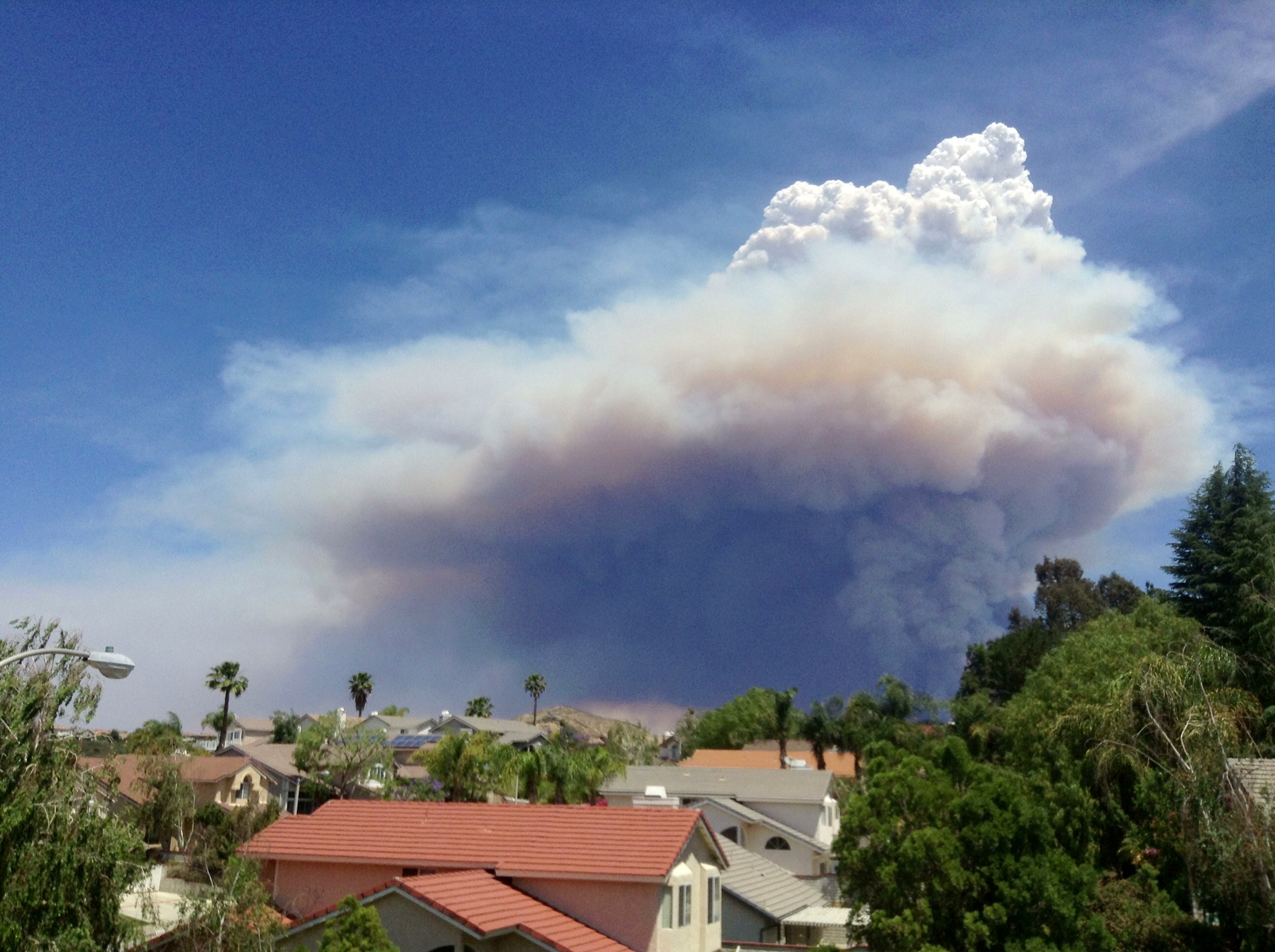
- The Powerhouse Fire on the afternoon of June 1, 2010, as seen from Santa Clarita
- Date: May 30, 2013 –; June 10, 2013
- Location: Los Angeles County, California, United States

Statistics
- Burned area: 30,274 acres (12,251 ha)

Impacts
- Deaths: 0
- Injuries: 10
- Structures lost: 53

Ignition
- Cause: Downed power lines

The Powerhouse Fire was a wildfire in northern Los Angeles County, California, mostly in the Angeles National Forest. It started at approximately 3:30 PM on May 30, 2013. It was 100% contained by June 10, 2013.

== Progression ==
The fire began near a Los Angeles Department of Water and Power (LADWP) facility in San Francisquito Canyon near Drinkwater Reservoir.

Overnight, between June 1 and June 2, the fire encountered an area where terrain aligned with high winds, causing it rapidly expand from 5,500 acres (2,200 ha) to 19,500 acres (7,900 ha).

The fire burned more than 30,000 acres and destroyed 53 structures, including 24 homes. At the fire's peak it threatened more than 1,000 structures. Two thousand firefighters were deployed to fight the fire. The communities of Lake Hughes, Elizabeth Lake, and Green Valley were evacuated.

== Effects ==
The fire never posed a threat to urban areas because the majority of the blaze was located in Angeles National Forest. The Powerhouse Fire did pose a threat to local forests as well as to powerlines, watershed areas, and the habitats of threatened and endangered species.

The fire resulted in 10 minor injuries. At least three were heat-related injuries suffered by firefighters.

A U.S. Forest Service investigation concluded that the fire had begun when an LADWP power line tripped, based in part on firefighters' discovery of a damaged insulator with signs of arcing at the site of the fire's ignition.

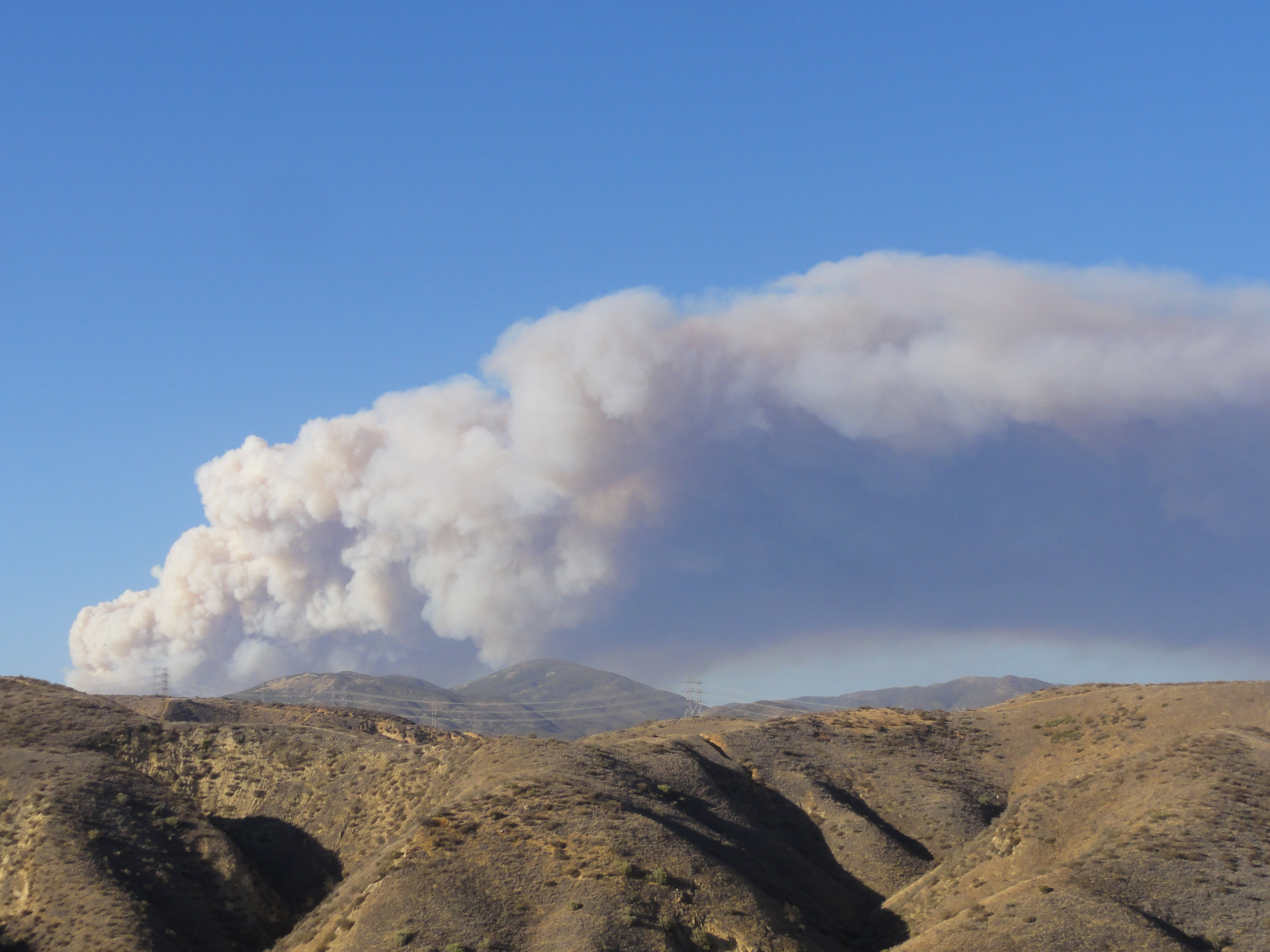
Powerhouse fire on the afternoon of May 30, 2013, as seen from Santa Clarita, CA.
