= 2013 California wildfires =

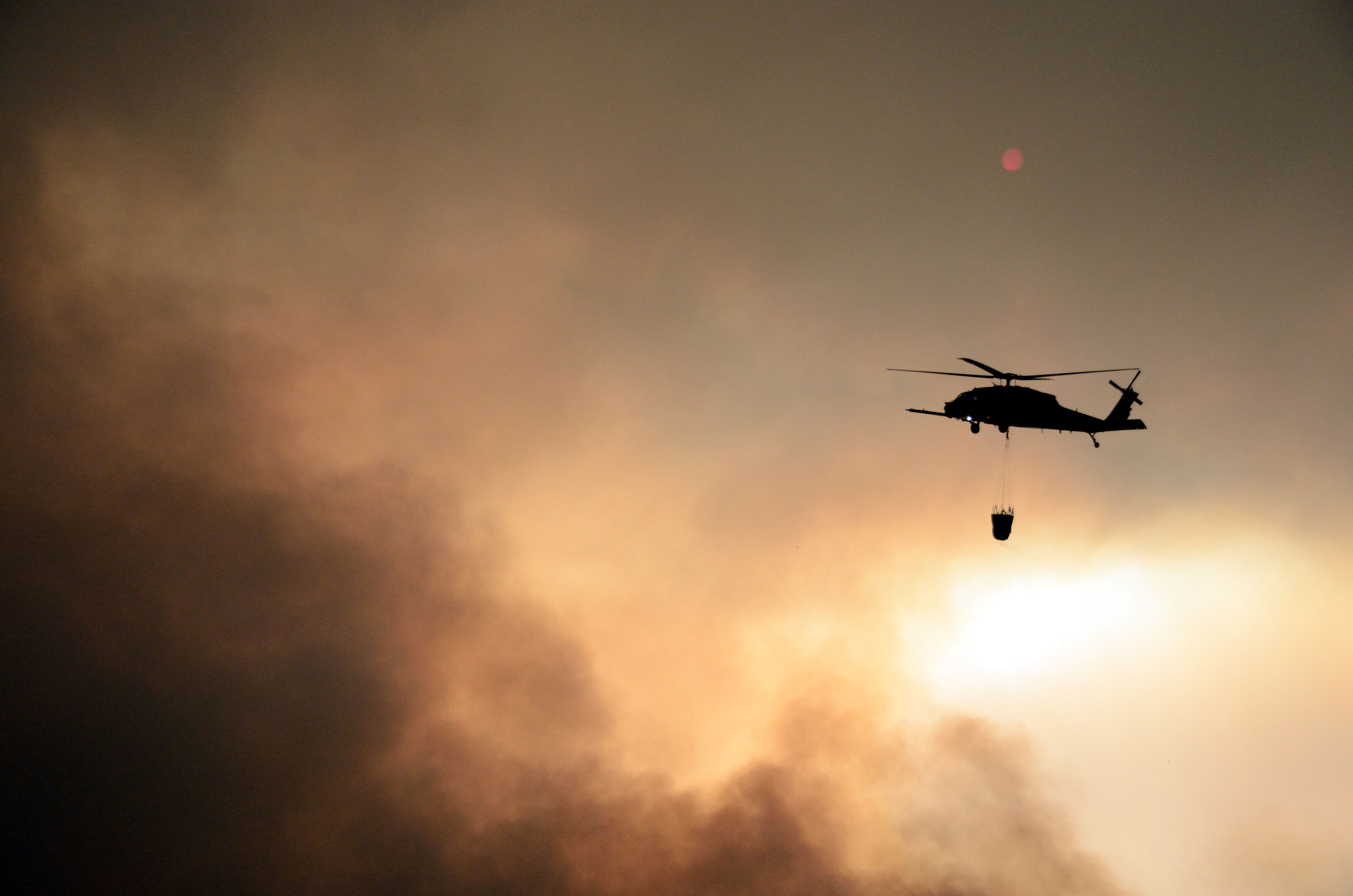

Statistics
- Total fires: 9,907
- Total area: 601,635 acres (2,434.73 km^{2})

Impacts
- Deaths: 1
- Injuries: At least 125
- Structures lost: 495
- Cost: >$218.15 million (2013 USD)

Map
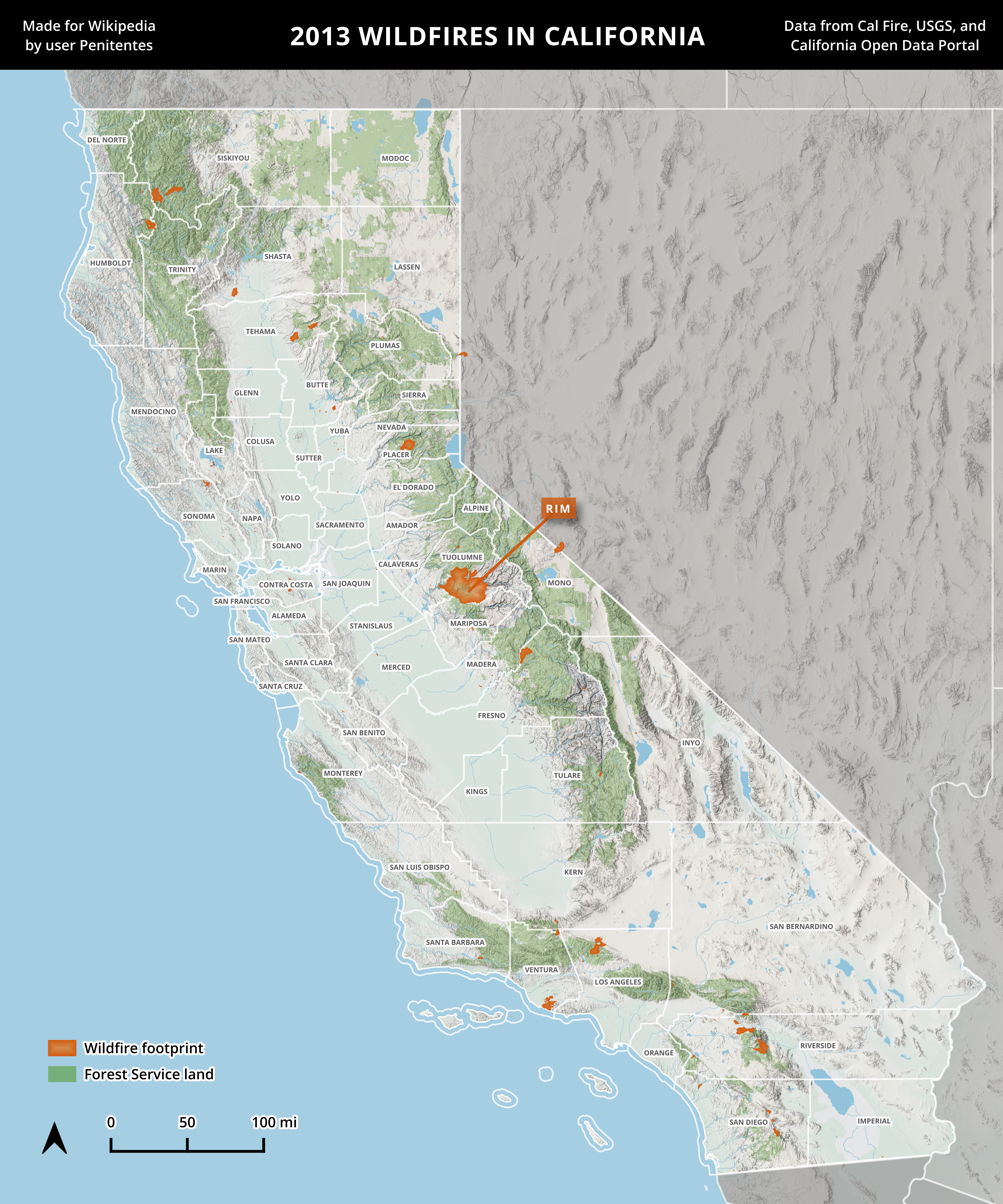
- A map of wildfires in California in 2013, using Cal Fire data

9,907 wildfires burned at least 601,625 acres (2,434.69 km^{2}) of land in the state of California during 2013. The wildfires injured at least 125 people and killed at least 1. They also caused over $218.15 million (2013 USD) in damage. These included several large, notable wildfires, including the Rim Fire, which became California's 3rd largest wildfire.

== Background ==
The timing of "fire season" in California is variable, depending on the amount of prior winter and spring precipitation, the frequency and severity of weather such as heat waves and wind events, and moisture content in vegetation. Northern California typically sees wildfire activity between late spring and early fall, peaking in the summer with hotter and drier conditions. Occasional cold frontal passages can bring wind and lightning. The timing of fire season in Southern California is similar, peaking between late spring and fall. The severity and duration of peak activity in either part of the state is modulated in part by weather events: downslope/offshore wind events can lead to critical fire weather, while onshore flow and Pacific weather systems can bring conditions that hamper wildfire growth.

== List of Wildfires ==
Below is a list of all fires that exceeded 1,000 acres (400 ha) during the 2013 fire season. The list is taken from CAL FIRE's list of large fires.

Name	County	Acres	Km^{2}	Start date	Contained Date (Note: Containment means that fire crews have established and secured control lines around the fire's perimeter. These lines are artificial barriers, like trenches or cleared vegetation, designed to stop the fire's spread, or natural barriers like rivers. Containment reflects progress in managing the fire but does not necessarily mean the fire is starved of fuel, under control, or put out.)	Notes
Panther	Tehama	6,896	27.9	May 1, 2013	May 9, 2013	
Summit	Riverside	3,161	12.8	May 1, 2013	May 4, 2013	1 structure destroyed
Springs	Ventura	24,251	98.1	May 2, 2013	May 9, 2013	
Grand	Kern	4,346	17.6	May 15, 2013	May 22, 2013	
San Felipe	San Diego	2,650	10.7	May 23, 2013	May 29, 2013	
General	San Diego	2,500	10.1	May 26, 2013	May 31, 2013	
White	Santa Barbara	1,984	8.0	May 27, 2013	June 5, 2013	
Powerhouse	Los Angeles	30,274	122.5	May 30, 2013	June 10, 2013	58 structures destroyed
Hathaway	Riverside	3,870	15.7	June 9, 2013	October 15, 2013	
Carstens	Mariposa	1,708	6.9	June 16, 2013	June 26, 2013	
Chariot	San Diego	7,055	28.6	July 6, 2013	July 15, 2013	149 structures destroyed
Mountain	Riverside	27,531	111.4	July 15, 2013	July 31, 2013	
Aspen	Fresno	22,992	93.0	July 22, 2013	September 8, 2013	
Forks Complex	Siskiyou	37,246	150.7	July 31, 2013	October 1, 2013	
Salmon River Complex	Siskiyou	14,754	59.7	July 31, 2013	August 31, 2013	
Falls	Riverside	1,383	5.6	August 5, 2013	August 9, 2013	
Power	Tuolumne	1,070	4.3	August 5, 2013	August 13, 2013	
Silver	Riverside	20,292	82.1	August 7, 2013	August 12, 2013	
Corral Complex	Humboldt	12,503	50.6	August 10, 2013	2 October 2013	
American	Placer	22,407	90.7	August 11, 2013	August 29, 2013	
Swedes	Butte	2,264	9.2	August 16, 2013	August 22, 2013	
Rim	Tuolumne	257,314	1,041.3	August 17, 2013	October 27, 2013	112 structures destroyed
Mission	Monterey	4,500	18.2	August 22, 2013	August 25, 2013	
Deer	Tehama	11,429	46.3	August 23, 2013	August 29, 2013	
Fish	Tulare	2,060	8.3	August 23, 2013	September 5, 2013	
Morgan	Contra Costa	3,100	12.5	September 8, 2013	September 14, 2013	Ignited at Mount Diablo.
Clover	Shasta	8,073	32.7	September 9, 2013	September 15, 2013	196 structures destroyed, 1 fatality
DeLuz	San Diego	2,236	9.0	October 5, 2013	October 9, 2013	
McCabe	Sonoma	3,505	14.2	November 22, 2013	November 28, 2013	

== See also ==
- List of California wildfires
- Climate change in California
