= Clover Fire =

2013 wildfire in Northern California

- Part of the 2013 California wildfires
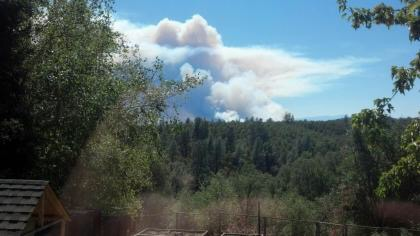
- Clover Fire, September 10, 2013
- Date: September 9, 2013 –; September 15, 2013
- Location: Shasta County, California
- Coordinates: 40.498332°N 122.535496°W

Statistics
- Burned area: 8,073 acres (3,267 ha; 13 sq mi; 33 km^{2})

Impacts
- Deaths: 1
- Injuries: 6
- Structures destroyed: 68 residences; 128 outbuildings
- Cost: >$72.3 million; (equivalent to about $96 million in 2024)

Ignition
- Cause: Arson
- Perpetrator: Zane Peterson

Map
- Location of fire in California

The Clover Fire was a fatal wildfire in Shasta County, California. It burned from September 9 to September 15, 2013 in an area near the communities of Happy Valley and Igo, California, about 10 miles southwest of Redding. It burned more than 8,000 acres (3,200 ha) and caused one death and six injuries. Damage was estimated at $65 million. One man has been charged with arson in the case.

== Progression ==
The fire was named for its origin near Cloverdale Road. It started around 12:30 PM on September 9 and spread quickly due to strong winds and dry conditions. The fire spread so fast that some residents were given just minutes to evacuate. The fire was fully contained on September 15. The cost of suppressing the Clover Fire came to more than $7.3 million.

== Effects ==
Brian Stanley Henry, age 55, a resident of Igo who formerly worked as a California Department of Forestry firefighter and timber faller, died in the fire.

Damage from the fire was estimated at $65 million.

== Investigation ==
Zane Peterson, a 29-year-old resident of Happy Valley was arrested in December 2013 and charged with 71 counts, including arson and murder. He is accused of starting the two separate fires which merged into the Clover Fire. He is also charged with setting six other wildfires between September and November 2013. The suspect previously worked for seven years (2005-2012) for the U.S. Forest Service as a firefighter and fire engine driver. He has entered a plea of not guilty.
