= Springs Fire =

2013 wildfire in Southern California

- Part of the 2013 California wildfires
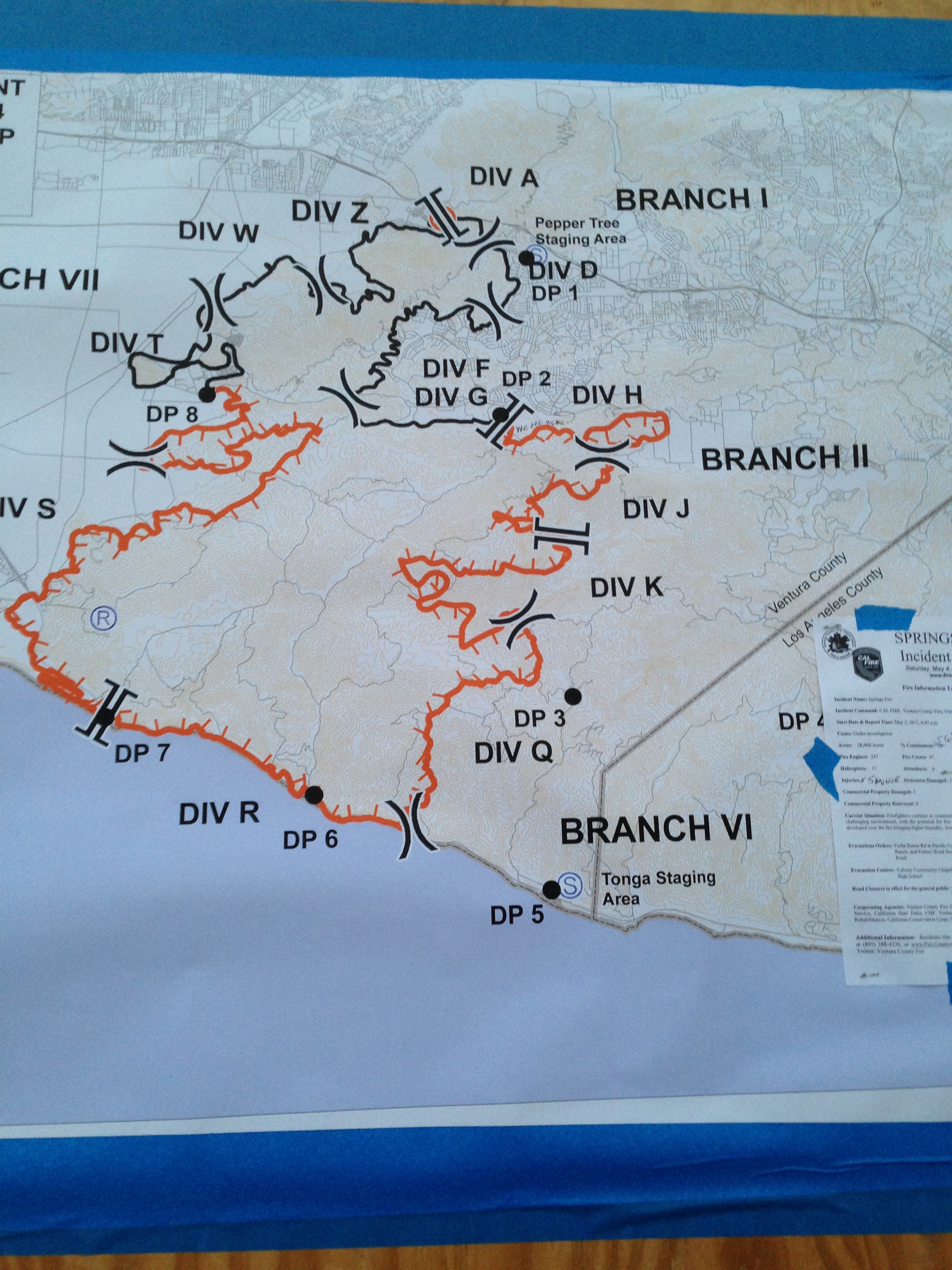
- A map of the footprint of the fire
- Date: May 2, 2013 –; May 6, 2013
- Location: Camarillo, California

Statistics
- Burned area: 24,251 acres (9,814 ha)

Impacts
- Structures destroyed: 15

The Springs Fire was a wildfire in Ventura County, California in May 2013. Although the fire burned only 15 homes, it threatened 4,000. This threat passed when rain shower from few narrow cold-frontal rainbands moved through the California area because of a low-pressure system off the coast. Some places got more than half an inch of rain.

The fire started at 6:45 AM on May 2, 2013, in Camarillo, California near U.S. Route 101 and burned across Pacific Coast Highway to the Pacific Ocean. Several neighborhoods were evacuated, along with the campus of California State University Channel Islands.

== Effects ==
The fire burned around 24,000 acres (9,700 ha) of brushland along coastal Ventura County and into the Santa Monica Mountains. Weather conditions made favorable conditions for brush fires. The Santa Ana Winds were blowing at 40 to 50 miles per hour (64 to 80 km/h), spreading the fire; single-digit humidity added to the problems. By May 3, the fire was only 20 percent contained; on May 4, higher humidity made firefighters jobs easier; and on May 5 the fire was 60 percent contained. On May 6, 2013, the fire was almost extinguished as rain fell in the area.

Scientists are concernmed about the impact of the fire on Dudleya verityi, a rare species of succulent plant known by the common name Verity's liveforever. Endemic to Ventura County, this species is only found on one edge of the Santa Monica Mountains, where it occurs in coastal sage scrub habitat. The dominant plants are California sagebrush (Artemisia californica), California buckwheat (Eriogonum fasciculatum) and purple sage (Salvia leucophylla). At least two occurrences are within the campus bounds of California State University, Channel Islands where faculty and students are tracking sites where the plant exists and studying it.

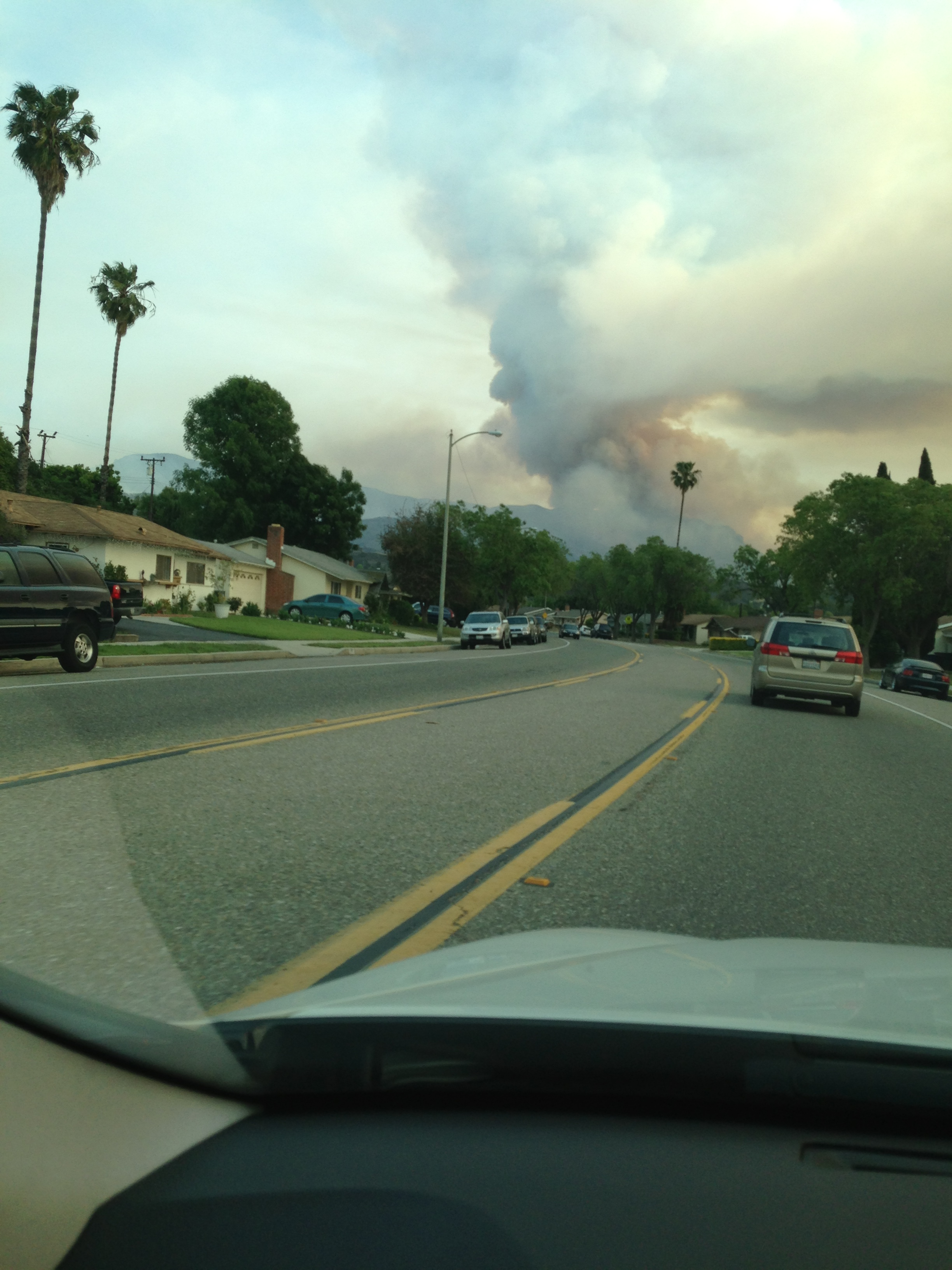
View of the fire

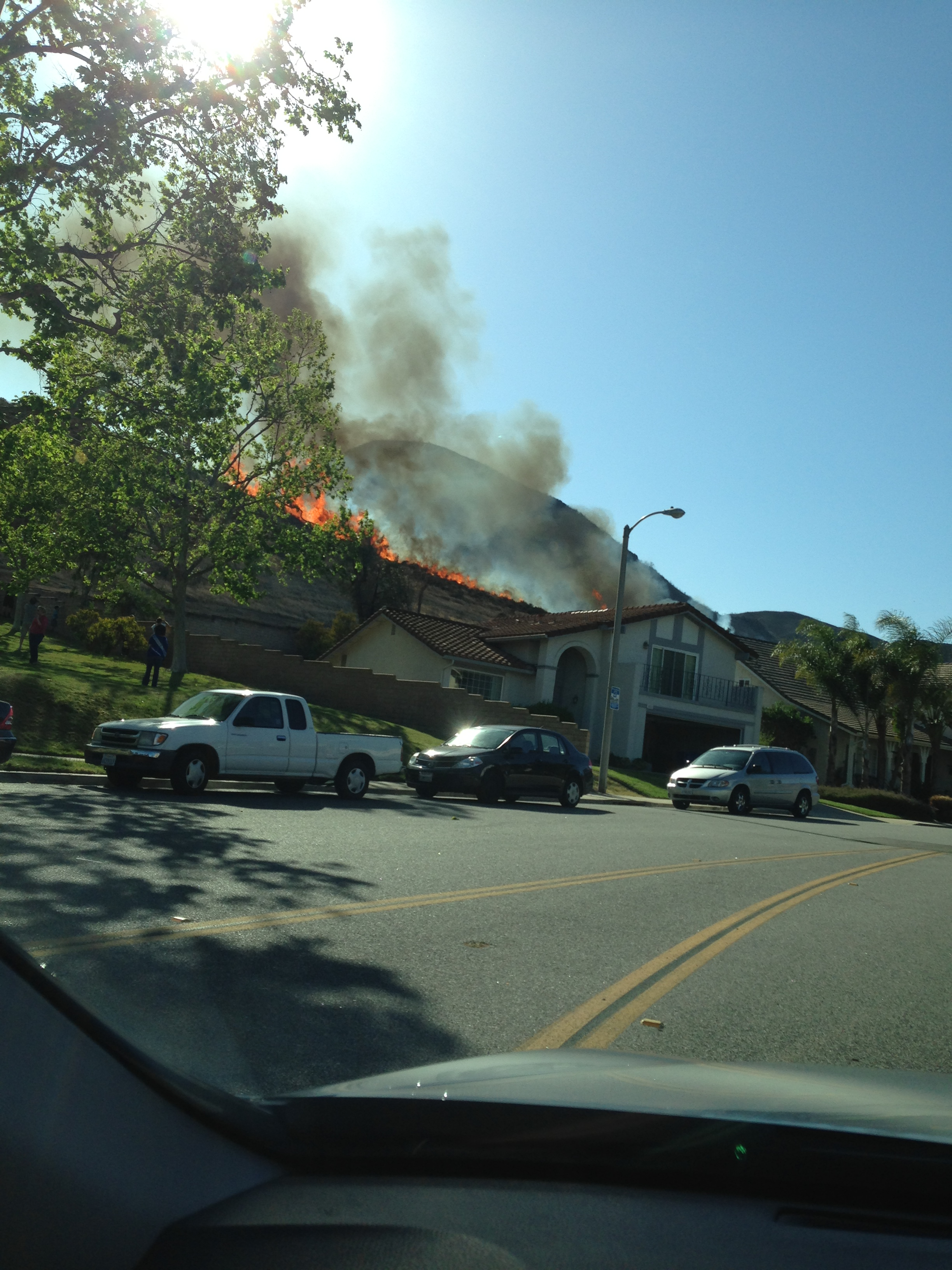
The Springs Fire approaching homes in Ventura

== See also ==
- 2013 California wildfires
- Other years with fires named "Springs Fire"
  - 2019 California wildfires — 4,840 acre forest fire in Mono County, California
  - 2026 California wildfires — 4,176 acre brush fire in Riverside County, California
