= Climate change in California =

Animated map of the progression of the drought in California in 2014, during which the drought covered 100% of California. As of December 2014, 75% of California was under Extreme (Red) or Exceptional (Maroon) Drought. The California drought continued after 2014.

Climate change in California has resulted in higher than average temperatures, leading to increased occurrences of droughts and wildfires. Over the next few decades in California, climate change is predicted to further reduce water availability, increase wildfire risk, decrease agricultural productivity, and threaten coastal ecosystems. The state could also be impacted economically due to the rising cost of providing water to its residents along with revenue and job loss in the agricultural sector, which impacts low-income Californians disproportionately.

Health impact is expected from wildfires, heat waves, and dirty air, causing more breathing problems, heart issues, and even deaths, especially in cities with a high level of pollution. Economic impacts also include inflation from rising insurance premiums, energy costs and food prices.

Climate-driven wildfires and rising temperatures in California are drastically reshaping ecosystems, causing habitat loss and threatening the survival of species like the California Spotted Owl, Coho and Chinook Salmon, and Desert Slender Salamander.

People in California are affected in different ways that intersect with their socioeconomic identities and cultural practices. The impacts of increased greenhouse gas emissions and PM2.5 make many Californians susceptible to health effects and is an example of environmental injustice.

California has taken a number of steps to mitigate impacts of climate change in the state.

== Paleoclimatological evidence ==
Paleoclimatological studies indicate that the last 150 years of California's history have been unusually wet compared to the previous 2000 years. Tree stumps found at the bottom of lakes and rivers in California indicate that many water features dried up during historical dry periods, allowing trees to grow there while the water was absent. These dry periods were associated with warm periods in Earth's history. During the Medieval Warm Period, there were at least two century-long megadroughts with only 60–70% of modern precipitation levels. Paleoclimatologists believe that higher temperatures due to global warming may cause California to enter another dry period, with significantly lower precipitation and snowpack levels than observed over the last 150 years.

== Extreme weather impacts ==
A 2011 study projected that the frequency and magnitude of both maximum and minimum temperatures would increase significantly as a result of global warming. According to the Fifth National Climate Assessment published in 2023, coastal states, including California, Florida, Louisiana, and Texas are experiencing "more significant storms and extreme swings in precipitation".

=== Wildfires ===
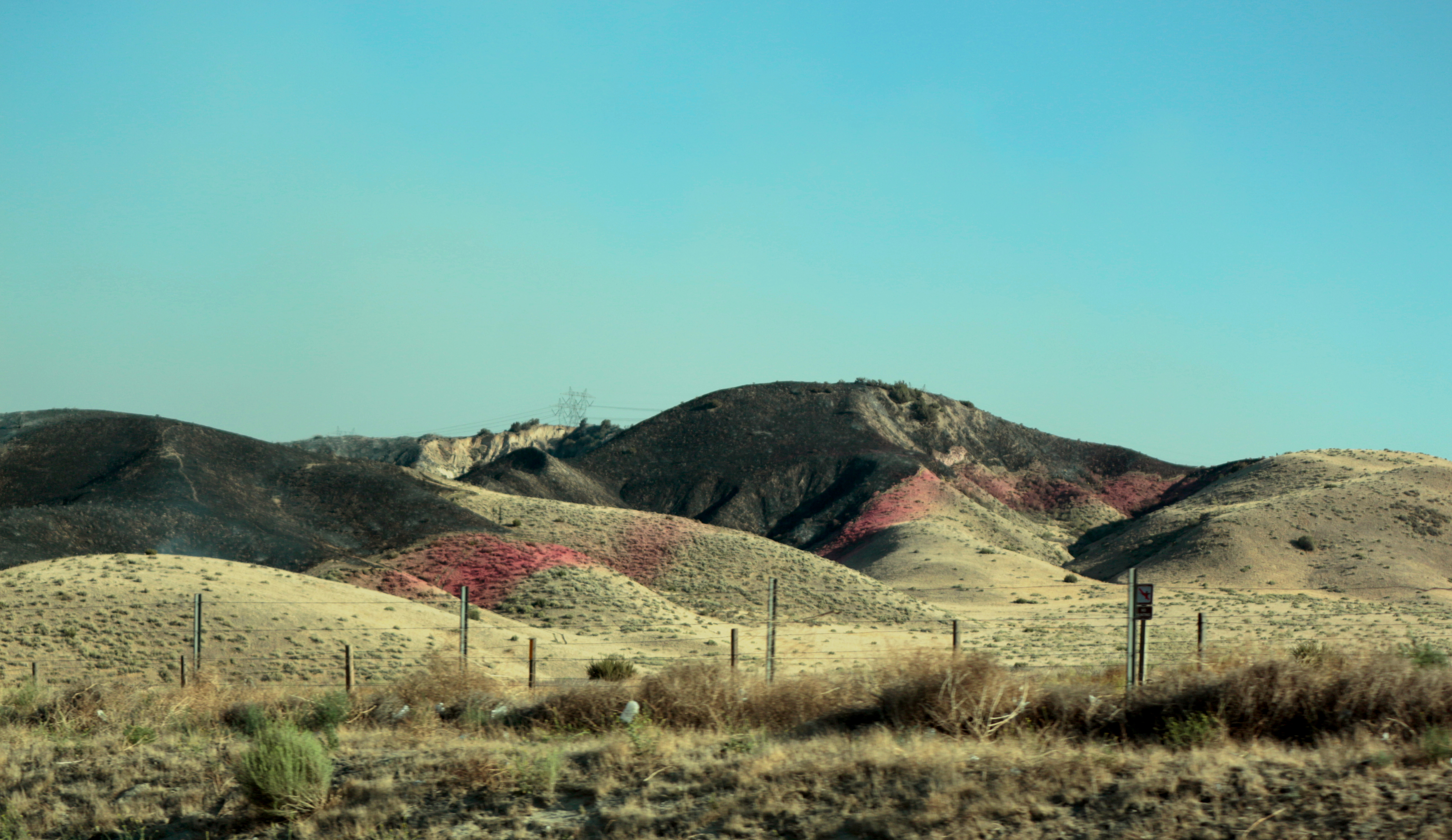
Fire retardant (pink) and smoldering brush in the Tumbleweed Fire, which burned 1,000 acres of vegetation north of Los Angeles in July 2021.

Governor Gavin Newsom talks about climate change and wildfires at the North Complex Fire in 2020.

Numerous studies have found that climate change is increasing the frequency of large and explosive wildfires in California in particular. The economic and human health damages of recent fire seasons has been estimated to be as high as $148.5 billion, or roughly 1.5% of California's annual GDP. This damage is mostly a result of smoke-related air pollution. As a consequence of further global warming, it is projected that there will be an increase in risk due to climate-driven wildfires in the coming decades. Because of warming, frequent droughts, and the legacy of past land management and expansion of residential areas, both people and the ecology are more vulnerable to wildfires. Wildfire activity is closely tied to temperature and drought over time. Globally, the length of the fire season increased by nearly 19% from 1979 to 2013, with significantly longer seasons in the western states. Since 1985, more than 50% of the wildfire area burned in the western United States can be attributed to anthropogenic climate change.

In addition, due to human fire suppression methods, there is a build of fuels in some ecosystems, making them more vulnerable to wildfires. There is greater risk of fires occurring in denser, drier forests, where historically these fires have occurred in low-density areas. Lastly, with increases in human population, communities have expanded into areas that are at higher risk to wildfire threat, making these same populations more vulnerable to structural damage and death due to wildfires. Since 1990, the average annual number of homes lost to wildfires has increased by 300%. Almost 900,000 of western US residences were in high risk wildfire areas as of 2017 with nearly 35% of wildfires in California starting within these high risk areas.

In 2019, after a "red flag" warning about the possibility of wildfires was declared in some areas of California, the Pacific Gas and Electric Company (PG&E) begun to shut down power, to prevent the inflammation of trees that touch the electricity lines. The climatic conditions that caused this warning became more frequent because of climate change. Bioengineering writer Maddie Blaauw suggested that if the temperatures keep rising, such power outages could become common.

Recent wildfire seasons have broken number of records. The 2018 season became the deadliest and most destructive in the state's history, with 103 people killed and 24,226 buildings damaged or destroyed. The 2020 season became the largest in the state's recorded history in terms of area burned, with more than 4 million acres burned across the state in 9,917 wildfires. Out of six of the biggest fires ever recorded in the state of California, five took place in 2020.

In 2017, a study projected that the single largest threat to Los Angeles County hospitals related to climate change is the direct impact of the expected increase in wildfires. In Los Angeles County, 34% of hospitals are located within one mile of fire hazard severity zones. Additionally, one of these hospitals was also deemed in danger of coastal flooding due to the effects of climate change as concluded by the study. This latter issue was also included and focused on, as the study likewise concluded that this would become a greater hazard as sea level rise due to increase annual temperatures.

A recent 2026 study found that inpatient healthcare facilities across California have been getting approximately 628 feet closer to wildfires each year on average. Additionally, the number of inpatient hospital beds located within five miles of a wildfire was 53% higher between 2017 and 2023 compared to 2001 to 2008

The January 2025 Southern California wildfires resulted in roughly 200,000 residents being forced to evacuate and over 18,000 structures being damaged or destroyed. The two largest fires, the Palisades Fire in the Pacific Palisades and the Eaton Fire in Altadena burned over 37,000 acres and killed 31 people. In Altadena, the Eaton Fire killed 19 people. 17 victims lived west of Lake Avenue, a predominately black neighborhood in Altadena. Residents from west Altadena received emergency evacuation orders hours after those in east Altadena, after the fire had already reached those residents' homes. In the Eaton fire, over 9,000 structures burned, with over 6,000 homes lost.

The fires in Los Angeles placed thousands under evacuations, with shelters overwhelmed with families, pets, and wildlife. In both the Palisades and Altadena, vast numbers of wildlife were displaced. Larger animals like bears and mountain lions were forced into neighborhoods; new bird species moved into new nests and areas across Los Angeles, while aquatic wildlife such as fish and newts sheltered-in-place. It is unclear about the effects of Monarch Butterflies in the region, who cluster on trees in the region. Studies show that insects and less mobile invertebrates such as aphids, parasitoid wasps, and springtails are essentially gone from the region as wind speeds and the expansion of the fire moved too quickly for them to fly away or find shelter.

Smoke is more toxic from urban fires due to what is being burned, which includes automobiles, plastics, metals, rubber, pesticides, paint, carpets, and anything else found in homes. Even in areas outside of the burn scar, smoke and ash can travel up to thousands of miles, depending on weather conditions. Wildfire smoke can make anyone sick, but children, elderly, and people with pre-existing medical conditions such as asthma are more likely to have health problems during and following smoke exposure.

During the Los Angeles fires in January 2025, more than 600,000 students had school canceled due to wildfire damage, ash, and smoke. More than 80% of students in Los Angeles Unified School District are in poverty. Many of these students were unable to access education, resources, and food due to closures and evacuations. Thousands of students from Altadena and the Pacific Palisades whose schools burned down were not able to be funneled into neighboring districts and schools for many weeks to months, and many entered classrooms that had high student-teacher ratios and were unable to get the academic and emotional support they needed.

California's wildfires affect many different communities of people. The Eaton Fire in Altadena was ignited from sparks on power lines owned by Southern California Edison Power, who failed to shut off power during 100-mile winds. Data shows that power plants are often placed in neighborhoods occupied by people of color, a majority of whom are low-income, which is reflected by Altadena's racial populations. Children are also disproportionately affected by wildfires, as they are more susceptible to health effects, often have school canceled due to air quality or evacuations, and cannot vote for legislation that affects them and the climate. Elderly and disabled communities are also dramatically affected by health concerns associated with wildfires, and many are unable to evacuate without assistance. Low-income communities often do not have the financial resources to evacuate, and if they lose their home, do not have the money to find a new home, participate in lawsuits, and find personal essentials like clothing and toiletries.

Wildfires are linked to climate justice because climate change exacerbates the frequency and severity of wildfires, and different communities disproportionately suffer due to intersectional identities. Wildfires can also have devastating effects on individual animal habitats and ecosystems. The winds generated in the January 2025 Los Angeles fires are a result of the orographic effect occurring on the San Gabriel and Santa Monica mountain ranges, which is amplified by decreased precipitation on the leeward side and increased wind on the windward side of the mountains.

==== Controlled burns ====
Wildfire suppression has resulted in wildfires becoming more severe and common, as dead and untamed brush is used as fuel by wildfires. A study performed in 2023 generated different forms of wildfire management, and built modeling framework that stimulated different wildfire conditions (wind, fuel, moisture, ignitions, growth, suppression, ecology). This simulation found that suppression bias directly influences fire activity and ecological responses in the environment. This is an example of climate injustice as marginalized communities are most affected by wildfires, including wildlife. While laws and regulations in California encourage controlled burns, there are often many environmental reviews and permits required that limit accessibility of performing controlled burns. This prevents many Indigenous tribes from being able to practice their culture, which includes controlled burns for vegetation management, ecological regeneration, and clearing brush to hunt.

The combination of fire suppression practices and human-driven climate change have increased the severity of wildfires. A study reviewed socioeconomic patterns that are related to reduced overall health, and health and found that PM2.5 is generated in a variety of industrial settings, including wildfires. Regions with high PM2.5 were correlated with high rates of poverty, housing inequities, linguistic isolation, unemployment, cardiovascular-related emergency department visits, and lower rates of education. Additionally, PM2.5 exposure is linked to health issues including dementia, Altzheimer's, preterm birth, and lung and brain cancer. These health effects and socioeconomic effects are amplified by wildfires and are a form of climate injustice. [i]

Fire is a traditional cultural practice for many indigenous communities throughout California. Norton-Smith et al. notes, "The exclusion of fire from landscapes creates a situation of denied access to traditional foods and spiritual practices, puts cultural identity at risk and infringes upon political sovereignty. On a more individual level, the altered forest conditions create social strain for the individuals who hold the most responsibilities to tend to specific places and provide food to the community for subsistence as well as ceremonial purposes." Chapin et al. (2008) found that the greatest wildfire risk is associated in areas where wildfire suppression has occurred.

Fire suppression is rooted in colonialism. In the late 1700s to early 1800s, colonists enacted regulations to prohibit cultural burning and keep Native Americans from their traditional homelands. Fire suppression has led to the overcrowding of forests and landscapes, increasing fuel loads throughout California. Additionally, the United States Forest Service (USFS) has historically discredited and downplayed Indigenous knowledge that has been passed down generationally for thousands of years through propelling ideas such as the "Indian savage". Fire suppression continues to be an expression of settler colonialism, as well as exacerbating anthropogenic climate change and preventing stewardship with the land.

=== Drought ===
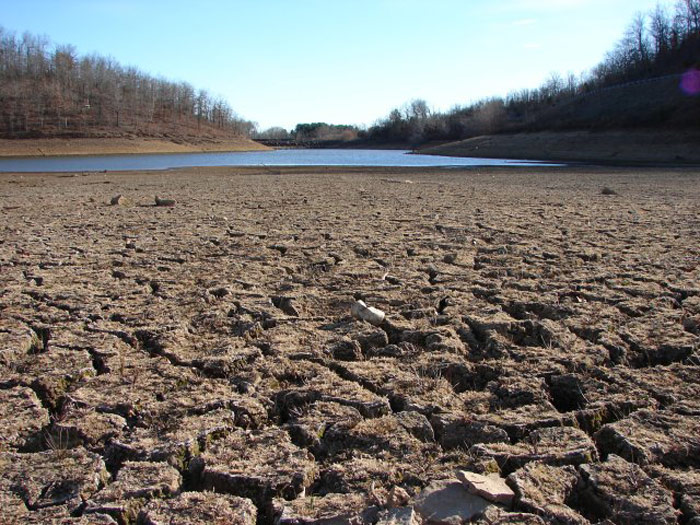
A typical dry lakebed is seen in California, which is experiencing its worst drought in 1,200 years, precipitated by climate change, and is therefore water rationing.

Research conducted in 2022 found that, through 1,200 years of data available in the region, the ongoing drought in the southwestern United States was the most severe drought ever recorded in the region. In the absence of climate change, the drought would have likely ended in 2005, which was categorized as a wet year. The flow of the Colorado River, supplying water to seven states, had "[shrunk] to the lowest two-year average in more than a century".

Temperature rise caused by climate change has been estimated to be a considerable contributor to the severity of the drought, with 88% of the western United States being categorized as drought-stricken, as anthropogenic warming substantially increases the likelihood of California droughts. According to the NOAA Drought Task Force report of 2014, the drought is not part of a long-term change in precipitation and was a symptom of the natural variability, although the record-high temperature that accompanied the recent drought may have been amplified due to human-induced global warming. If the temperature rise continues, the drought will become worse.Not only so, there is a connection between Tropical Pacific ENSO fluctuations and extratropical percipitation that could lead to droughts, floods, and heat waves all in one

According to NASA, tests published in January 2014 have shown that the twelve months prior to January 2014 were the driest on record, since record-keeping began in 1885. A water due to low snowpack prompted Californian Governor Jerry Brown to issue a series of stringent mandatory water restrictions on April 1, 2015.

In February 2014, the effects of the California drought caused the California Department of Water Resources to develop plans for a temporary reduction of water allocations to farmland by up to 50% at the time. During that period, California's 38 million residents experienced 13 consecutive months of drought. This is particularly an issue for the state's 44.7 billion dollar agricultural industry, which produces nearly half of all American-grown fruits, nuts, and vegetables. However, a study published in 2016 found that the net effect of climate change has made agricultural droughts less likely, with the authors stating that "Our results indicate that the current severe impacts of drought on California's agricultural sector, its forests, and other plant ecosystems have not been substantially caused by long-term climate change."

As California continues to experience droughts, different communities are affected in disproportionate ways. UC Davis found that California's surface water costs triple during droughts. Furthermore, the cost of water varies if water systems rely on groundwater because treatment and delivery costs are relatively low. The Public Policy Institute of California notes that average water bills vary considerably across urban water systems, there are no guideline for determining if water bills are too high, and that public water agencies are restricted in assisting low-income households with water bills. Thus, people in different socioeconomic groups are impacted differently from rising water costs.

Racial disparities have also been linked to not having access to water. San Francisco and Los Angeles are ranked as some of the highest metropolitan areas in the United States with the highest percentages of households lacking complete plumbing. The Journalist's Resource from Harvard Kennedy School introduces the idea of "plumbing poverty," where infrastructure provision is clearly racialized and historically produced in the United States.

Research conducted by Carolina Balazs and Isha Ray and published in the American Journal of Public Health (April 2014) found that from 2005 to 2010, groundwater pumped from wells in the San Joaquin Valley have been chronically contaminated with arsenic, levels above the accepted amount set by the World Health Organization (WHO). Exposure to arsenic can cause long-term health effects such as skin, lung, and bladder cancer, cardiovascular disease, neurological issues, or short-term effects such as nausea, vommiting, and diarrhea. These policies were designed to deprive residents of drinking water resources. The 1973 Tulare County General Plan stated that "non-viable communities would, as a consequence of withholding major public facilities such as sewer and water systems, enter a process of long term, natural decline as residents depart for improved opportunities in nearby communities." This is an example of systematic environmental injustice, where essential services in Tulare County were intentionally poisoning residents, which also contaminated ecosystems and damaged plants, animals, and soil health.

Percent Area in U.S. Drought Monitor Categories

=== Atmospheric rivers and megafloods ===
Atmospheric rivers are powerful weather events that pick-up moisture from the ocean and transport water across the land and are responsible for half of California's annual precipitation events. They commonly cause flooding, landslides, power outages, and damage to structures.

A study published in Science Advances in 2022 stated that climate-caused changes in atmospheric rivers affecting California had already doubled the likelihood of megafloods since 1920—which can involve 100 inches (250 cm) of rain and/or melted snow in the mountains per month, or 25 to 34 feet (7.6 to 10.4 m) of snow in the Sierra Nevada—and runoff in a future extreme storm scenario is predicted to be 200 to 400% greater than historical values in the Sierra Nevada.

Atmospheric rivers are crucial for building the state's snowpack and refilling reservoirs and groundwater but often cause significant damage to communities. With global warming and climate change, warmer atmospheres hold more vapor, making atmospheric rivers more intense and extreme. Wind is commonly associated with atmospheric rivers, and typically cause damage to homes and buildings, uproot trees and telephone poles, cause power outages, and injure people from flying debris. Effects from atmospheric rivers have varying effects on different communities and people. People who are low income may live in more severely affected areas, have less access to resources for repairs, and be more exposed to debris and active hazards.

=== Forest management ===
Drought-surviving sugar pines around Lake Tahoe have been found among 129 million trees in California killed between 2012 and 2016 by drought and bark beetles. Thousands of seedlings descended from these trees are being planted south-facing slopes on the lake basin's north side with the hope that they carry genes that make them more resilient to drought, waning snowpack and other effects of global warming in the forests of Sierra Nevada.

The 2022 IPCC report on climate change and mitigation suggests that California land management needs to consider the changing climate when updating their forest management practices, especially when considering fire management. In forests of the southwestern United States, climate change and fire exclusion management practices have led to increased severity of wildfires. Prescribed burning is an effective fire management tool that, when utilized in savanna ecosystems early in the dry season, has also been shown to reduce emissions. The results on whether or not prescribed burning also reduces emissions in forests are inconclusive and needing further study.

=== Agriculture ===
Extended periods of higher temperatures are expected to increase navel orangeworm reproduction, resulting in increased insect damage to almond, walnut, and pistachio crops.

California has over 76,000 farms and ranches and is one of the largest and most diverse agricultural industries in the United States. Climate change has increased global warming, which has begun (and will continue) to reduce winter chill hours. It is projected that by 2050, yields of avocados will decrease by 40 percent, and yields of almonds, table grapes, oranges, and walnuts will decrease by 20 percent. Furthermore, climate change reduces the amount of available water for agriculture in both plant and animal cultivation. Soil health and nutrients decrease as soil erosion is amplified by intense winds and rains, and moisture is reduced during droughts. Already, California has lost over one million acres of available agricultural land between 1984 to 2010, and another one million acres are projected to be lost by 2030 from climate change. Millions of people rely on Californian agriculture for access to citrus, fruits, nuts, cattle, and vegetables. It is reported that California produces half of the United States' vegetables, and over three-quarters the country's fruits and nuts. This industry generates billions of dollars annually and employs over 900,000 people, all of which is vital to California's economy.

Furthermore, increased temperatures from human driven climate change expand insect life cycles and breeding seasons, leading to more offspring each year. In each generation of offspring, common agricultural pests become more resistant to crops, pesticides, and temperatures. Extreme weather events help distribute pests, and elevated carbon dioxide in the atmosphere weaken plant defenses.

Pesticide use is known as one of the most prominent and explicit cases of environmental racism in the United States. Hundreds of thousands of farmworkers, the majority who are Mexican immigrants or from other Latino communities, are poisoned by distributing pesticides and harvesting or transporting those crops. Additionally, their families are poisoned from proximity to pesticides and groundwater and soil contamination. In California, 200 million pounds of pesticides are applied annually and more than half of pesticide use occurs in the eight lowest-income counties. As climate change increases insects and pests, pesticides become more important to maintain healthy crop harvests and support farms. However, many pests are adapting to less harsh chemicals and pesticides, pushing towards more severe chemical usage on farms.

Conservation groups are partnering with farmers in Central California to flood fields for portions of the year, in order to increase habitat for species impacted by climate change, such as salmon and migratory birds.

The impact of climate change on precipitation in California can lead to the occurrence of severe drought. During droughts in California, farmers leave land fallow. In 2014 drought season, 430,000 acres of farmland were left to fallow. Farmers anticipate they will fallow a similar number of acres of farmland in 2022.

=== Fisheries impact ===
Ocean heat waves since 2013 have delayed three Dungeness crab seasons, due to harmful algal blooms that contaminate crab meat.

=== Hydrology and dams ===
Changes in hydrology have occurred as decreased snowpack, especially at lower elevations, melts and has spring run-off earlier in the year. Run-off in the late spring decreases, as snow melts at the end of winter and early spring, which increases river and stream temperatures and raises variability in streamflow. These changes in hydrology and the river system extend the period of flooding and run-off, as well as increasing the grain sizes that can be transported in the channel, which destroys plants and crops. Furthermore, it erodes the river and banks at a higher rate for longer periods of time (decreasing available land and changing the river's natural erosion patterns). The rate of snowpack melting has increased as a result of climate change, as the average global temperature has begun to melt snowpack earlier in the year and not become cold enough for precipitation in the form of snow.

California has a long history of dams, most notably the Hoover Dam, Oroville Dam, St. Francis Dam, and Klamath River dams.

There were originally a total of six dams on the Klamath river, now only two non-hydroelectric dams remain and are part of the Klamath River watershed. These dams were in place to divert water for irrigation purposes. Recent efforts removed four lower hydroelectric dams (Copco No. 1, Copco No. 2, Iron Gate Dam, and J.C. Boyle Dam) as part of the largest dam removal effort. This removal was part of an effort to improve water quality and fish migration in the river. Dams impact salmon's ability to migrate upstream to spawn, leading to mass fish die-offs. Furthermore, stagnant water created by dams lead to increased water temperature and sediment accumulation, which is ideal for algal blooms. Algal blooms produce toxins that are harmful to plants, animals, and humans by creating "dead zones" that deplete oxygen in the water and block sunlight from reaching aquatic plants and animals.

Indigenous tribes actively rely on the Klamath river to practice culture. Salmon and trout struggled to survive and reproduce prior to the dam removal due to unhealthy water conditions. Indigenous tribes rely on salmon for food and to practice traditional fishing methods, which allows them to practice their culture. Furthermore, the removal of these dams have allowed traditional indigenous peoples to descend from the headwaters of the Klamath River in Southern Oregon to the mouth of the Klamath in Northern California, home to the Yurok Tribe.

== Sea level rise ==
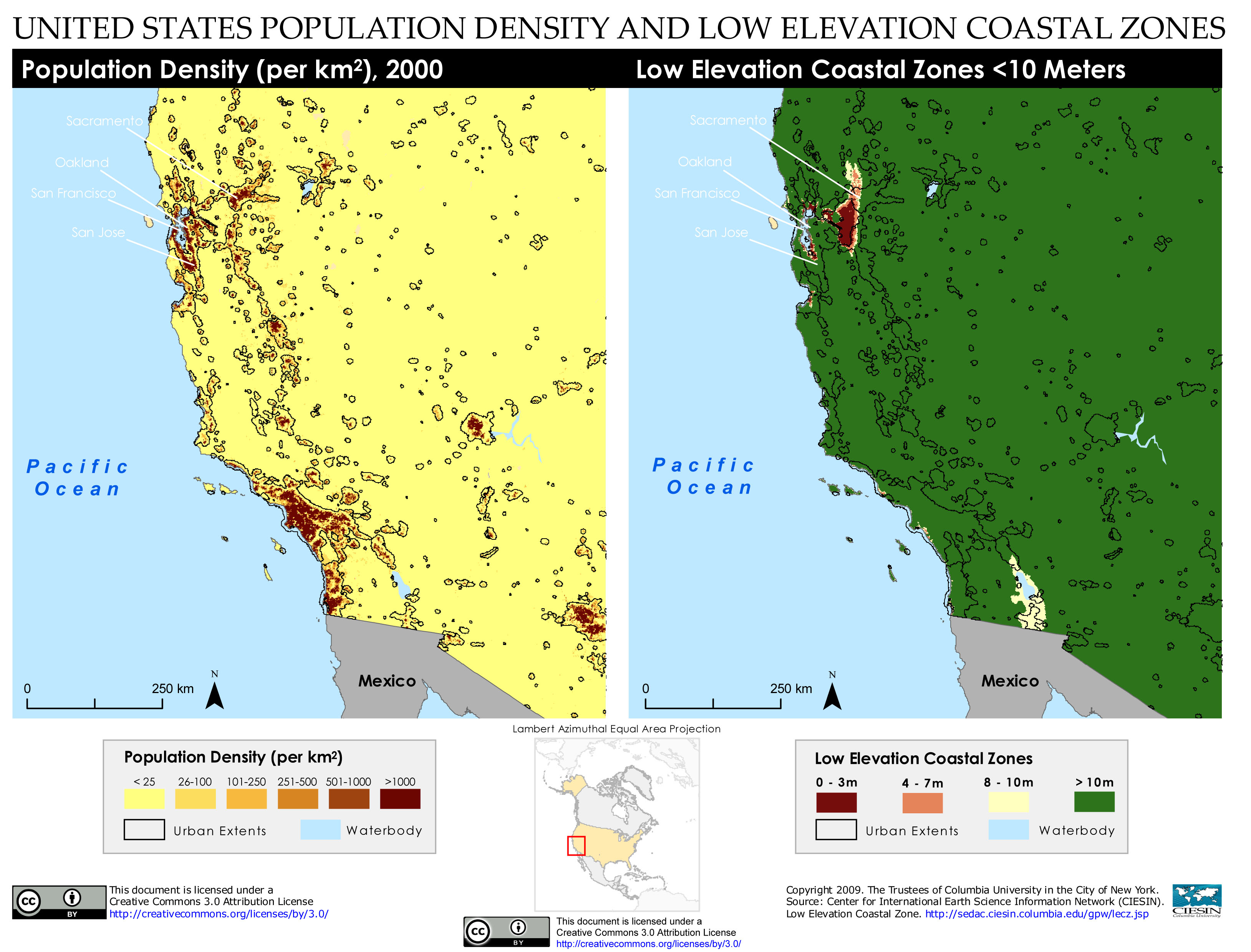
Population density and low elevation coastal zones in Western United States.

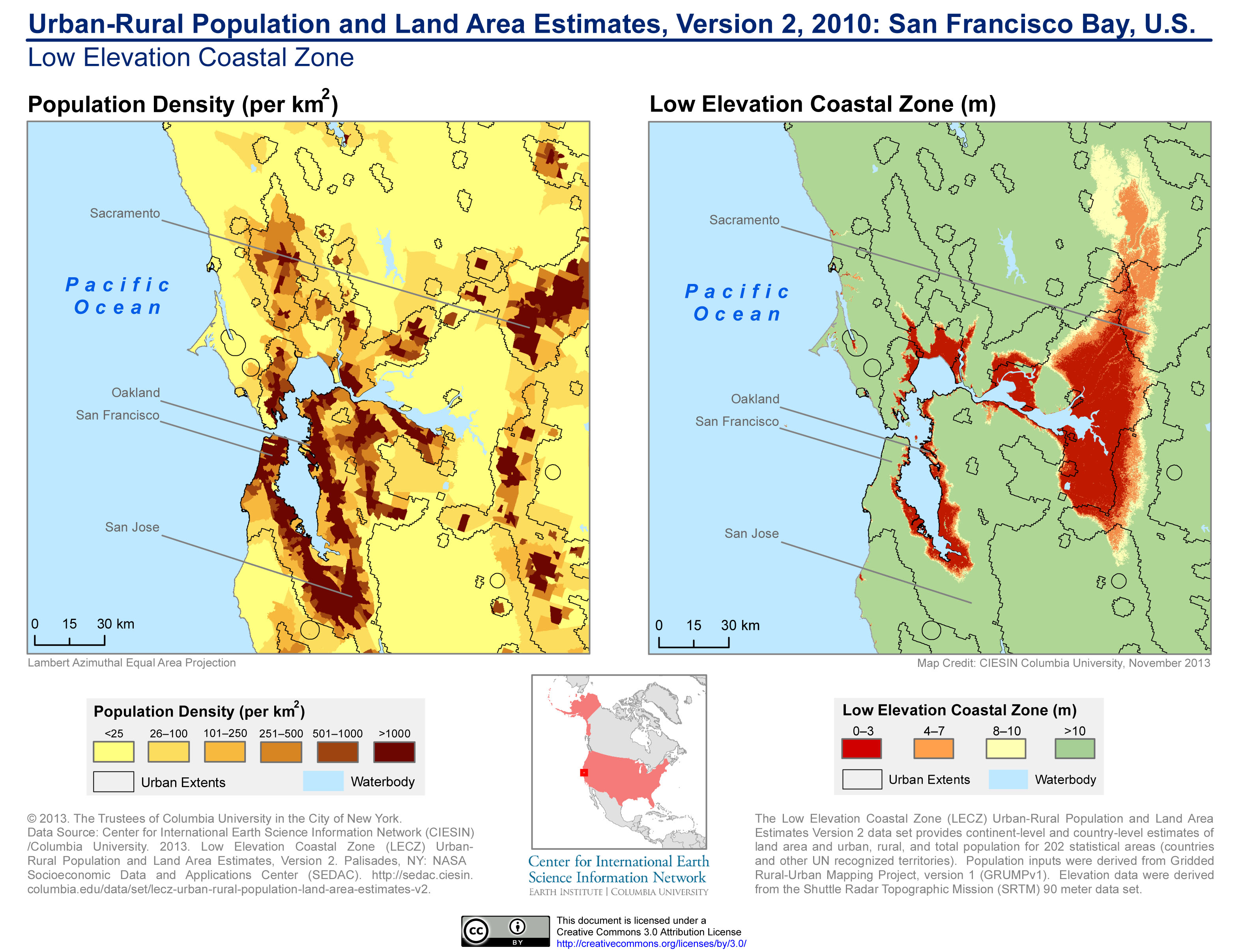
Population density and low elevation coastal zones in San Francisco Bay (2010).

A 2017 study published in the Journal of Geophysical Research projected that a sea level rise of between 1 and 2 m will swallow between one-third and two-thirds of Southern California beaches. Sea levels off the coast are projected to rise 20–55 inches over the next century. The rise of sea levels leads to the destruction of sea life, permanent floods, and coastal erosion. According to an economic assessment done by Risky Business Project, "if current global greenhouse gas emission trends continue, between $8 billion and $10 billion of existing property in California is likely to be underwater by 2050, with an additional $6 billion to $10 billion at risk during high tide."

Rising sea levels are also projected to increase local flooding and saltwater intrusion in California. By elevating coastal groundwater tables and pushing saline water inland, this poses new risks to freshwater supplies and infrastructure.

A 2024 research found that the rate of sea-level rise globally rose from 1.2mm per year between 1901 and 1990 to 4.4mm per year between 2013 and 2022. However, the sea level of California rose about 20cm over the past century.

== Health impacts ==
Expected increases in extreme weather could lead to increased risk of illnesses and death. There are various diseases that will impact Californians as a result to climate change. "Exposure to wildfire smoke has been linked to health problems such as respiratory infections, cardiac arrests, low birth weight, mental health conditions, and exacerbated asthma and chronic obstructive pulmonary disease.17 Longterm exposure to wildfire smoke generated an estimated $76 billion to $136 billion per year in health costs across the continuous United States from 2008 to 2012, with some of the most significant impacts in northern California."

=== Heat waves ===
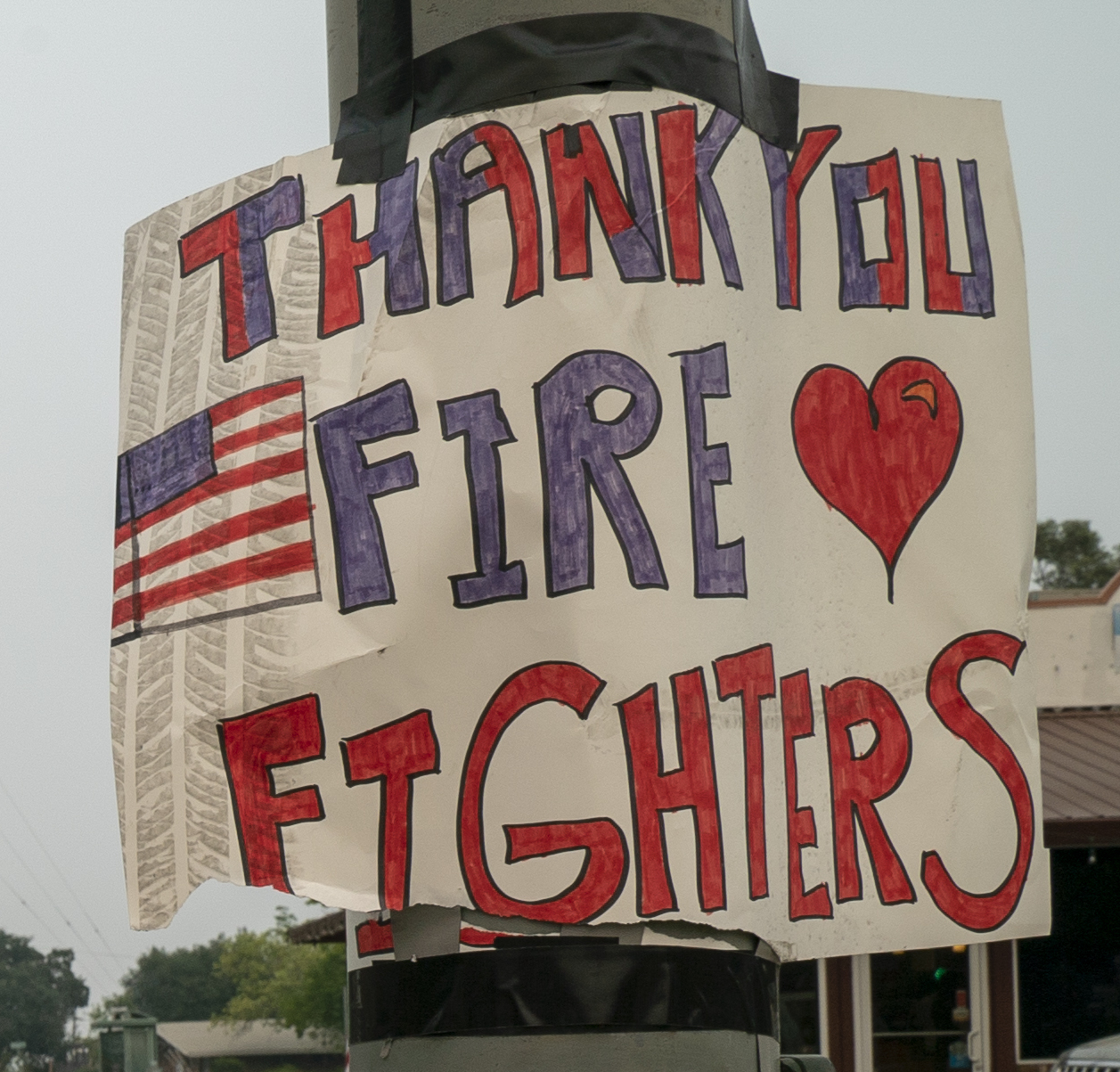
Sign thanking firefighters after the Carr Fire, Redding, 2018.

From May to September 1999 – 2003, a study was conducted in nine Californian counties that found that for every 10 °F (5.6 °C) increase in temperature, there is a 2.6 percent increase in cardiovascular deaths.

==== 2006 heat wave ====
A study of the 2006 Californian heat wave showed an increase of 16,166 emergency room visits, and 1,182 hospitalizations. There was also a dramatic increase in heat related illnesses; a six-fold increase in heat-related emergency room visits, and 10-fold increase in hospitalizations.

A study of seven counties impacted by the 2006 heat wave found a 9 percent increase in daily mortality per 10 degrees Fahrenheit change in apparent temperature for all counties combined. This estimate is 3 times greater than the effect estimated for the rest of the warm season. The estimates indicate that actual mortality during the 2006 heat wave was two or three times greater than the initial coroner estimate of 147 deaths.

=== Air pollution ===
Research suggests that the majority of air pollution related health effects are caused by ozone (O3) and particulate matter (PM). Many other pollutants that are associated with climate change, such as nitrogen dioxide, sulfur dioxide, and carbon monoxide, also have health consequences.

Five of the ten most ozone-polluted metropolitan areas in the United States (Los Angeles, Bakersfield, Visalia, Fresno, and Sacramento) are in California. Californians suffer from a variety of health consequences due to air pollution – including 18,000 premature deaths attributed to various causes such as respiratory diseases as well as a number of other illnesses.

Climate change may lead to exacerbated air pollution problems. Higher temperatures catalyze chemical interactions between nitrogen oxide, volatile organic gases and sunlight that lead to increases in ambient ozone concentrations in urban areas. A study found that for each 1 degree Celsius (1 °C) rise in temperature in the United States, there are an estimated 20–30 excess cancer cases, as well as approximately 1000 (CI: 350–1800) excess air-pollution-associated deaths. About 40 percent of the additional deaths may be due to ozone and the rest to particulate matter annually. Three hundred of these annual deaths are thought to occur in California.

== Economic impacts ==
=== Inflation ===
Economic impacts also include inflation from rising insurance premiums, energy costs and food prices.

=== Gross domestic product ===
The Natural Resources Defense Council (NRDC) estimates that under a business-as-usual scenario, between the years 2025 and 2100, the cost of providing water to the western states in the United States will increase from $200 billion to $950 billion per year, an estimated 0.93–1 percent of the United States' gross domestic product (GDP). Four climate change impacts—hurricane damage, energy costs, real estate losses, and water costs—alone are projected to cost 1.8 percent of the GDP of the United States, or just under $1.9 trillion in 2008 U.S. dollars by the year 2100.

=== Job opportunities ===
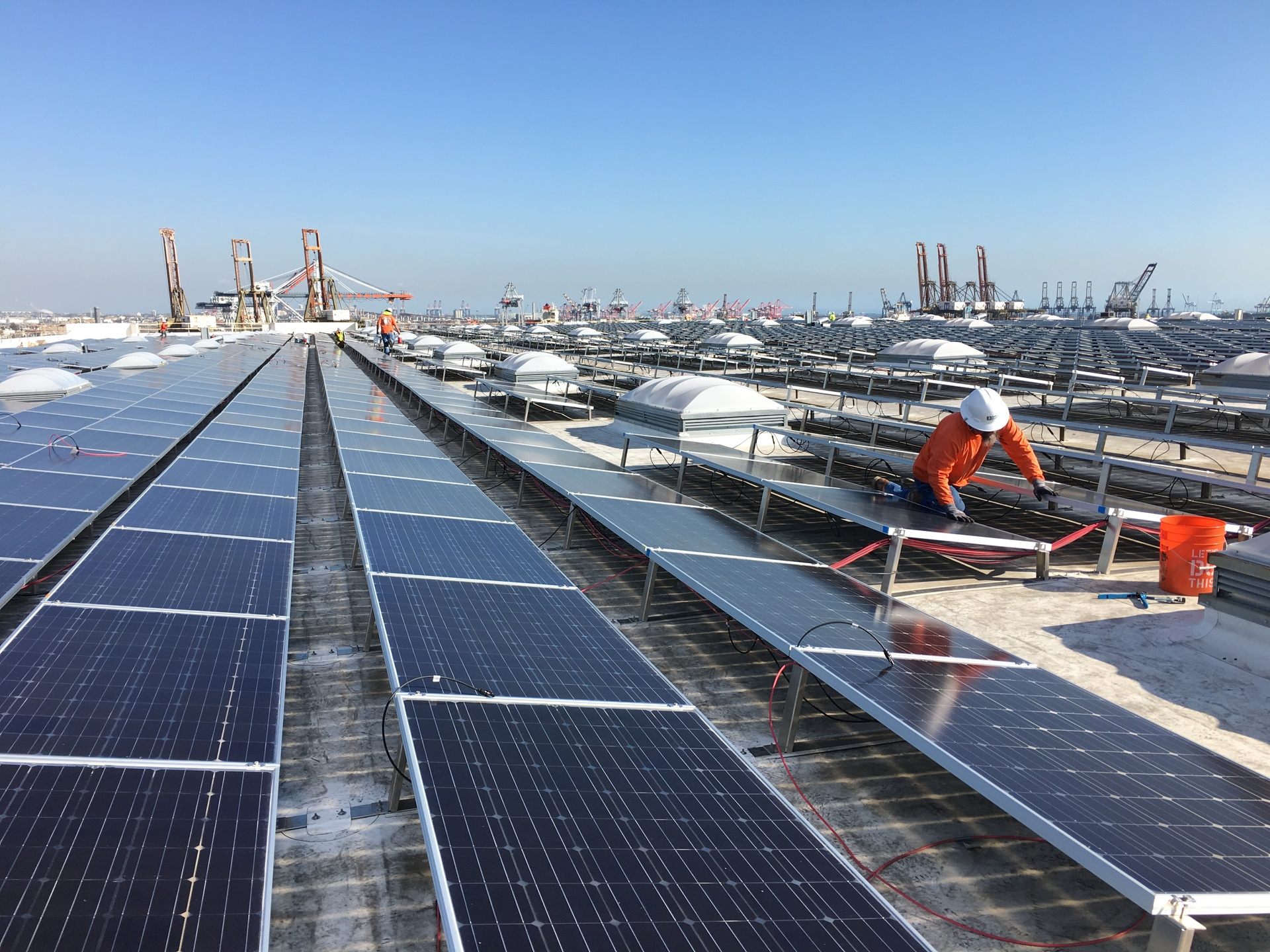
Solar installation, Los Angeles

A study conducted in 2009 showed that increases in frequency and intensity of extreme weather due to climate change will lead to a decreased productivity of agriculture, revenue losses, and the potential for lay offs. Changing weather and precipitation patterns could require expensive adaptation measures, such as relocating crop cultivation, changing the composition or type of crops, and increasing inputs such as pesticides to adapt to changes in ecological composition, that lead to economic degradation and job loss. Climate change has adverse effects on agricultural productivity in California that cause laborers to be increasingly affected by job loss.

For example, the two highest-value agricultural products in California's $30 billion agriculture sector are dairy products (milk and cream, valued at $3.8 billion annually) and grapes ($3.2 billion annually). It is also expected to adversely affect the ripening of wine grapes, substantially reducing their market value.

== Legislation ==
California has taken a number of legislative steps and extensive measures and initiatives targeted at the broader issue of climate effects seeking to prevent and minimize the risks of possible effects of climate change by a wide variety of incentives, measures and comprehensive plans for clean cars, renewable energy, and pollution controls on industry with overall high environmental standards. California is known for its leading role in the realm of ecoconscious legislature not just on a national level but also globally. Legislation aims to include environmental and environmental justice components that address the unequal distribution of climate change impacts.

In 2007, the California Legislature enacted AB 32, the Global Warming Solutions Act of 2006, which required the state to reduce greenhouse-gas emissions to 1990 levels by 2020. It tasked the California Air Resources Board (CARB) with developing a Scoping Plan to implement the statute. AB 32 was consistent with Governor Arnold Schwartznegger's 2005 Executive Order S-03-05, which, in addition, required California to reduce its emissions to 80% below 1990 levels by 2050. CARB updated the Scoping Plan in 2014. SB 32, enacted in 2016, set the State's climate goals beyond 2020, requiring a 40% reduction below 1990 levels by 2030 and an 80% reduction by 2050. The CARB 2017 Scoping Plan, detailing how the State will implement SB 32, sets statewide goals for per-capita GHG emissions: they must be reduced to 6 MTCO2e (metric tonnes of carbon-dioxide equivalent) by 2030, and 2 MTCO2e by 2050. CARB's 2022 Scoping Plan continues the implementation of SB 32.

The California GHG Emissions Inventory began tracking statewide emissions in 2000. Since 2000, greenhouse gas emissions in California have steadily dropped by 21%, while the state's economy has increased by 81% over this period of time. Data shows that by 2023 California was powered by two-thirds of clean energy, which is the largest economy in the world to have such a significant amount of clean energy use. Furthermore, fossil fuel use has decreased from vehicles, despite an increase in milage. There has been a higher demand for zero-emission vehicles (ZEVs), with almost 30% of cars purchased in the third quarter of 2025 being ZEVs. While this change has worked towards California's climate goals, California historically has had issues with smog filling the Los Angeles basin in the 1970s. This smog prevented locals and children from being outside, while there were mass die-offs of birds from pollution filling their lungs.

== Adaptation ==
California organizes its climate adaptation efforts through the 2024 California Climate Adaptation Strategy. This strategy identifies six priorities which includes protecting climate vulnerable communities, public health and safety, strengthening economic resilience, protecting natural systems, using climate science, and improving coordination and partnerships. The California Legislative Analyst's Office identifies five major climate hazards currently facing the state: extreme heat, wildfire, drought, inland flooding, and coastal flooding and erosion from constant sea-level rise over time. The California Legislative Analyst's Office identifies four unique ways the state can support adaptation towards accommodating these major climate hazards. Statewide standards and guidance, better and more efficient climate information, coordination between state and local governments, and targeted financial support pose significant efforts towards the state supporting adaptation. California Senate Bill 379 requires cities and counties to address climate adaptation and resilience in the safety elements of their general plans. A peer-reviewed study discovered the quality of local adaptation plans showed improvement and success after the mandate took effect and the study also found many cities used a current local plan to meet the requirement through existing hazard mitigation plans.

Extreme heat is a major concern and focus of California's adaptation policy affecting the state of California. Although extreme heat affects all regions of the state, unique threats and risks vary among communities as higher temperatures and more frequent heat waves affect every region of the state disproportionately coupled with people with limited access to cooling or shade may be subject to greater risks during extreme heat events. California's 2022 Extreme Heat Action Plan separates the required state action into four action paths including public awareness and notification, community services and response, environment resilience, and nature focused solutions. These actions described in the plan consist of monitoring heat-related illnesses, cooling homes and education centers, supporting community resilience centers, and expanding shade and other cooling measures among affected areas. The California Legislative Analyst's Office identifies low-income households, medically vulnerable residents, and outdoor workers as groups that may require additional support and assistance. In addition, a 2024 peer-reviewed study examined the combined effects of extreme heat and wildfire smoke on various cardiorespiratory hospitalizations among all different communities in California. This study concluded that wildfire smoke had varied effects on people among communities with greater effects found in communities with lower incomes, less health-insurance coverage, and less tree-canopy coverage.

== Wildlife impacts ==
Climate driven wildfires are having dramatic impacts on wildlife in California. Wildfires are altering habitats, distributing species, and overall ecological relationships. As temperatures rise, many species are shifting their ranges to higher elevations or northward, while some southern bird species are now nesting regularly in the state. These shifts are causing significant habitat loss, with projections suggesting that between 21 and 56% of California's natural areas may become unsuitable for current ecosystems by 2100. Some ecosystems, such as pinyon-juniper woodland and freshwater marshes, could lose up to 97% of their suitable habitat.

Some species that could be affected include the California Spotted Owl. This species relies on stable forest environments with large, old trees. Climate change-induced droughts and extreme weather events disrupt these habitats, affecting their ability to reproduce and survive. The effects also extend to the Central California Coast Coho Salmon: These salmon are vulnerable to habitat changes due to increased droughts and floods. Climate change can degrade their spawning grounds, affecting egg and juvenile survival. Sacramento River Winter-Run Chinook Salmon are also impacted by the worsening of climate change in California. Rising temperatures and reduced water availability due to climate change threaten their spawning success, as they require cold water conditions. The Desert Slender Salamander is an example of an amphibian affected by California's climate change. This species depends on moist habitats that are increasingly drying out due to higher temperatures and reduced precipitation associated with climate change.

== Climate justice ==
Climate justice recognizes the disproportionate impacts of climate change on low-income communities and communities of color around the world, seeking to address the root causes of climate change and in doing so, address a broad range of social and environmental injustices. Climate change leads to extreme weather events and disrupts economic, social, and political systems. In California and beyond, the poorest populations experience the worst impacts, despite the wealthiest people responsible for generating the highest gas emissions driving climate change.

An example of climate injustice are the January 2025 wildfires in Los Angeles, as climate change increases the likelihood of wildfire in highly exposed Greater Los Angeles. During the fires, millions of people were exposed to hazardous smoke and ash, including increased particulate matter. This leads to significant health effects, both long-term and short-term. The elderly and young needed assistance evacuating, and in many cases nursing-homes had not practiced emergency evacuation procedures. In Altadena (Eaton Fire), 48% of Black households were destroyed or majorly damaged. Climate change amplifies the effects of wildfires (EPA). Different intersecting identities influence people to be affected differently by climate change.

Another example of climate injustice is the fossil fuel industry worsening the climate crisis by emitting heat-trapping greenhouse gases into the atmosphere and worsening air and water pollution. Simultaneously, low income and/or communities of color are more likely to live in areas immediately polluted by these industries and will experience the health consequences of this environment.

There are six pillars of climate justice, which include a just transition of transition of fossil-fuel energy to renewable energy, social, racial, and environmental justice, indigenous climate action, community resilience and adaptation, natural climate solutions, and climate education and engagement. These pillars aim to work towards environmental justice for all living things that are impacted by climate change and climate-related natural disasters. Furthermore, climate justice seeks to minimize disproportionate adverse impacts by focusing on dismantling barriers that create inequalities on a global scale, such as income equality or decreasing reliance on fossil fuels.

=== Climate impacts on indigenous communities ===
Climate change has significant effects on the livelihoods of indigenous tribes across California. For example, the Karuk are a federally recognized tribe who are located in their ancestral homelands along the Klamath River in Northern California. Historically, they have had abundant food sources (fish, salmon, deer) and enough resources to be sustained by the environment. However, along with cultural practices associated with European settlement (displacement, resource extraction, attempted genocide), climate change has disrupted food sources. Climate driven impacts include temperature and precipitation changes, increased carbon dioxide from wildfires, deforestation, and a loss of wet meadows, riparian systems, and grasslands. The loss of these ecosystems prevents the Karuk from practicing their culture at sacred sites, changing food sources, and forces for relocation.

A study conducted by the University of Washington and The Nature Conservatory found that Native Americans are six times more vulnerable to the impacts of wildfires than white people and live in geographical areas that are more prone to climate crisis. Additionally, Indigenous communities are often not recognized in decision-making processes, addressed in local and federal policy, leading to Indigenous perspectives being ignored.

As California and the United States responds to climate change, many renewable energy sources are relied on such as solar and wind energy, but many are proposed to be built on indigenous lands without the consent of tribes. In many states, developers are trying to bypass indigenous sovereignty to build quickly. In California, the California Energy Commission (CEC) is working towards equity in planning and funding renewable energy. Commissioners from the CEC and California Public Utilities met with Native American tribal leaders to discuss the transition to clean energy. In Humboldt County, the Karuk Tribe and the Blue Lake Rancheria Tribe have built an independent renewable-energy microgrid, which is also used as a shelter during emergencies by the American Red Cross.

== See also ==
- 2012–2013 North American drought
- 2014 California wildfires
- 2013 California wildfires
- California Environmental Protection Agency
- Climate change in the United States
- CoolCalifornia.org
- Effects of global warming
- List of U.S. states and territories by carbon dioxide emissions
- Plug-in electric vehicles in California
- Pollution in California
- Valley fever
