= Summit Fire (2013) =

2013 wildfire in Southern California

- Part of the 2013 California wildfires
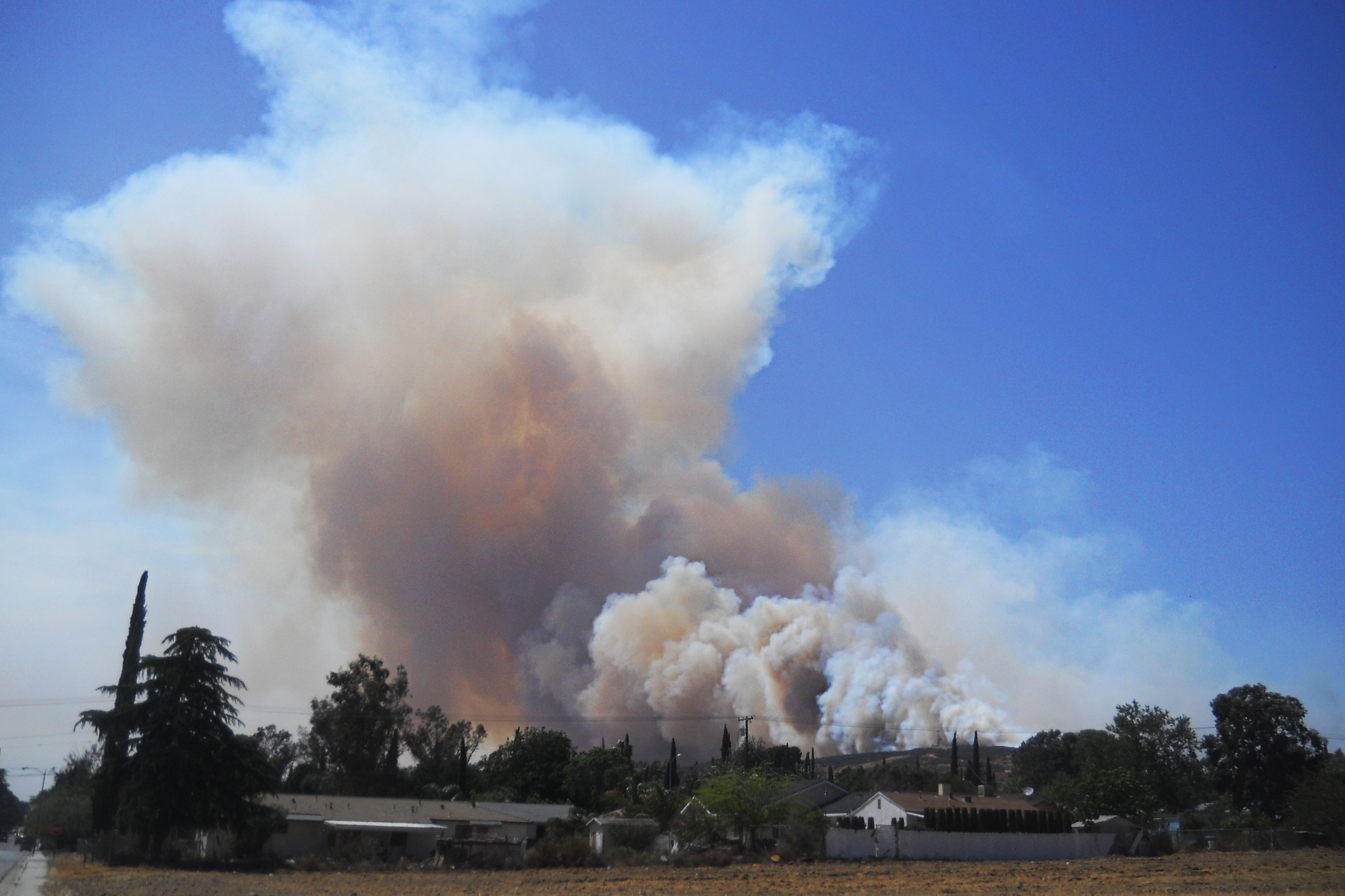
- The Summit fire being blown by strong Santa Ana winds on Wednesday, May 1.
- Date: May 1, 2013 –; May 4, 2013
- Location: Banning, Riverside County, California
- Coordinates: 34.288877°N 116.941311°W

Statistics
- Burned area: 3,161 acres (13 km^{2})

Impacts
- Structures lost: 1

Map
- Location within southern California

The Summit Fire was a wildfire that started in the Mias Canyon area north of Banning in Riverside County, California, on May 1, 2013. By the time the fire was contained on May 4, 3,161 acres (12.79 km^{2}) had burned and 1 residence had been destroyed.
