= Chips Fire =

2012 wildfire in Northern California

- Part of the 2012 California wildfires
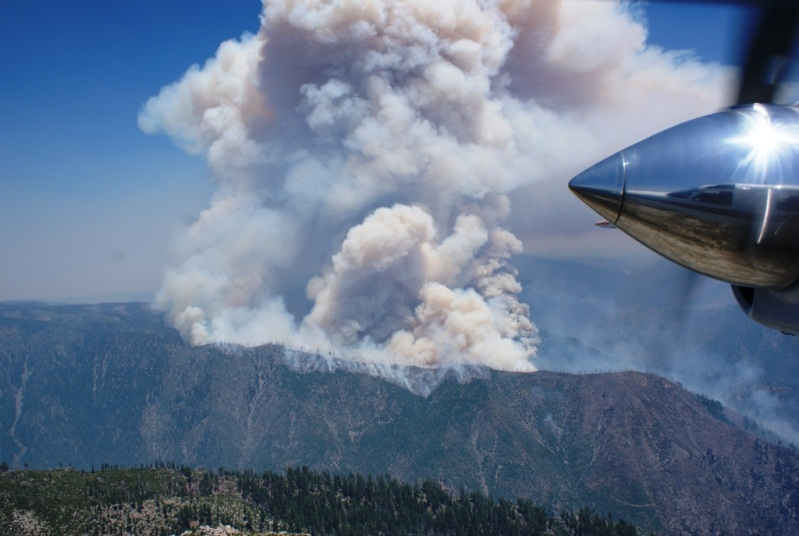
- The Chips Fire producing a large smoke column on August 2, 2012
- Date: July 29 –; August 31, 2012; (34 days)
- Location: Plumas County, Northern California, United States
- Coordinates: 40.01°N 121.278°W

Statistics
- Burned area: 75,431 acres (30,526 ha; 118 sq mi; 305 km^{2})

Impacts
- Structures destroyed: 9
- Cost: $55 million; (equivalent to about $74.1 million in 2024)

Ignition
- Cause: Human-caused

Map
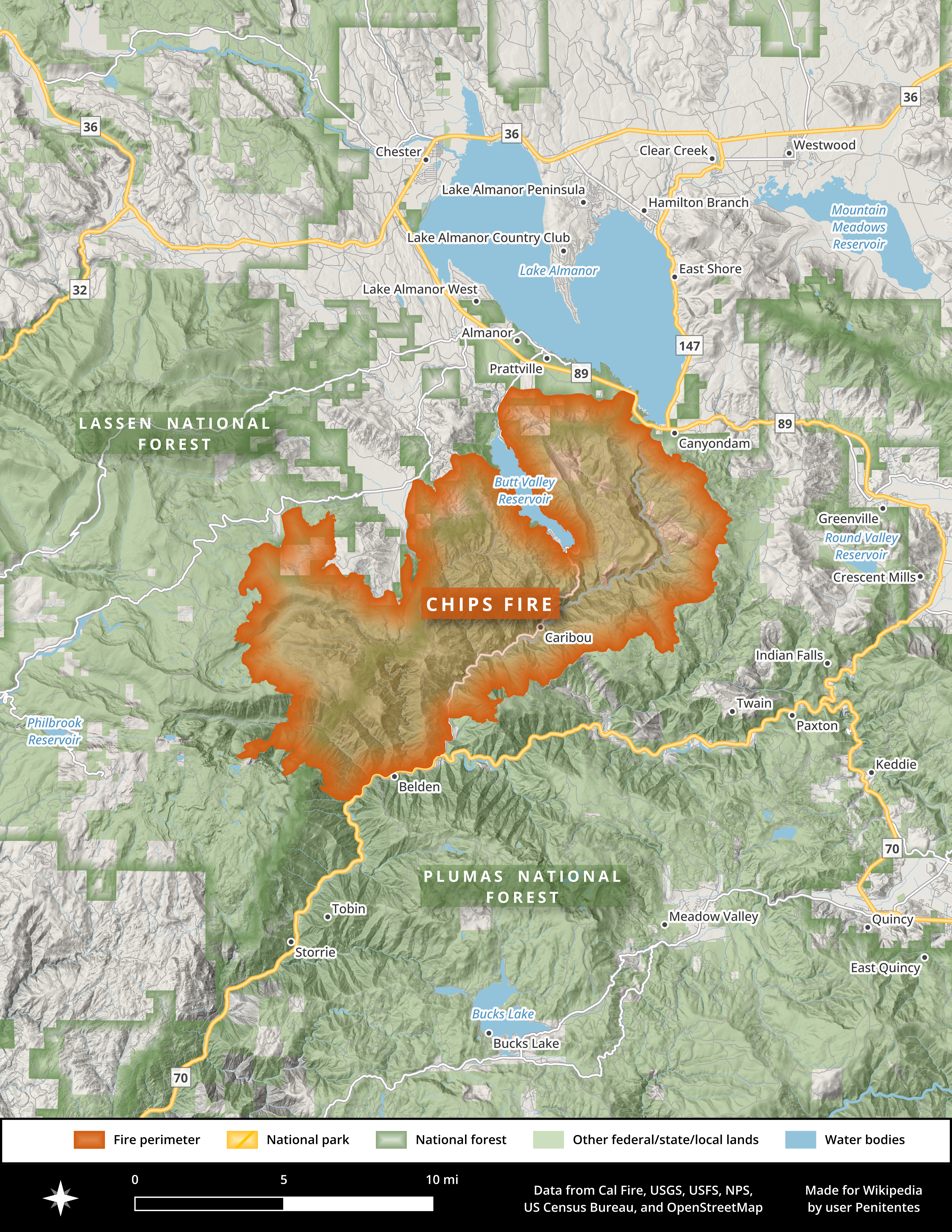
- The Chips Fire burned in the North Fork Feather River Canyon, south of Lake Almanor

- The fire burned in the northern Sierra Nevada, affecting Plumas and Lassen counties

The 2012 Chips Fire was a large wildfire in California's Plumas County. After igniting on July 29, the fire burned for 33 days and spread to 75,431 acres (30,526 hectares), or more than 118 square miles (310 square kilometres), before it was fully contained on August 31. In the process it became the second-largest fire of California's 2012 wildfire season after the Rush Fire in Lassen County.

The Chips Fire burned in the northern Sierra Nevada, primarily impacting Plumas National Forest and private timberlands. While the fire threatened nearby communities, such as Belden and Prattville, it only destroyed nine structures. The cost of the firefighting effort was estimated at $55 million. The fire started directly adjacent to the Pacific Crest Trail and was determined to have been human-caused.

== Background ==
A combination of conducive weather, fuels (vegetation), and terrain made the fire resistant to control. A U.S. Forest Service report concluded that the fire "burned with high intensity because of high fuel loads, very dry fuels, and steep topography. Winds were mostly calm, but relative humidity was low and temperatures high."

The spread of the Chips Fire was driven by typical August weather for the region, with mild (<10-mile-per-hour (16 km/h) diurnal winds, extremely low relative humidity levels that fluctuated between 10 and 20 percent, and high temperatures usually exceeding 80 °F (27 °C) and occasionally exceeding 100 °F (38 °C). The Forest Service regarded the Haines Index, a weather index intended to measure the potential for dry and unstable air, as a good predictor of intense wildfire behavior and growth during the Chips Fire.

During the winter and spring of 2011–2012, a low snowpack dried out fuels on the ground. Consequently, 1,000-hour fuel moistures were critically low—below 10 percent—at the time of the fire. The lack of snow, as well as cold snaps, helped kill brush. Snags from the earlier Storrie Fire also remained: the area of the burn where the Chips Fire began had not been salvage logged, and multiple wind events over the winter of 2011–2012 broke many snag tops off, contributing to ground fuel loading.

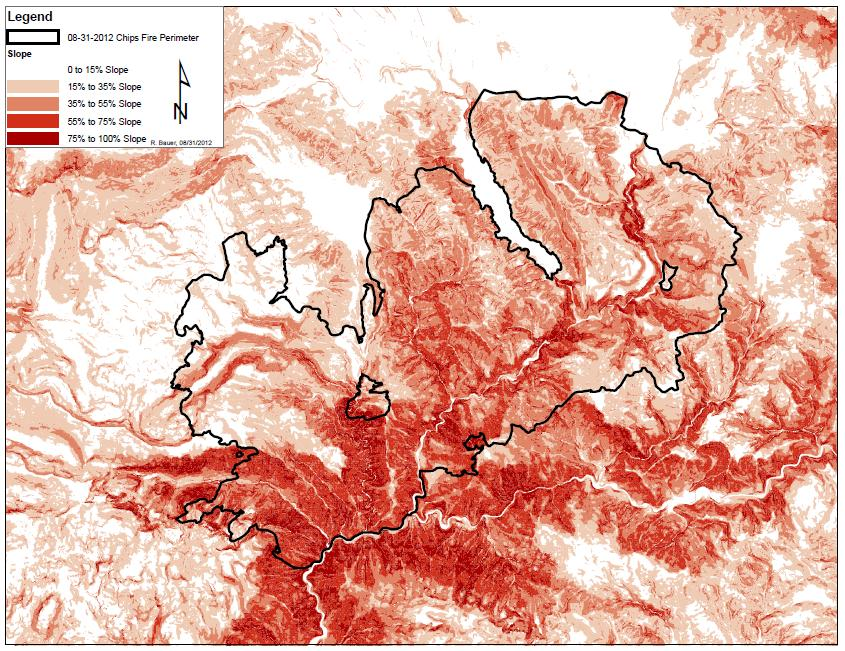
A map of terrain slope within the Chips Fire footprint, with darker shades of red representing steeper slopes

The Chips Fire was also difficult to combat in part because of the steep and inaccessible terrain it began in, along the Feather River Canyon watershed. The canyon has witnessed many large wildfires, including the 1999 Bucks Fire, the 2000 Storrie Fire, the 2008 BTU Lightning Complex, the 2018 Camp Fire, and the 2021 Dixie Fire. The canyon is steep and rugged, in some places rising more than 5,000 feet (1,500 m) from the Feather River to surrounding peaks. The majority of the Chips Fire burn area consisted of slopes between 55 percent and 70 percent.

== Progression ==
=== July 29–31 ===
The Chips Fire was first spotted by firefighters on July 29, 2012, at 1:52 a.m. PDT as a 10-acre (4.0 ha) fire on the eastern slope of the Chips Creek drainage, a mile above Highway 70 in the Feather River Canyon. Burning on both sides of the Pacific Crest Trail in the Plumas National Forest, the fire was determined to have been human-caused.

As resources arrived through the early morning hours, incident command noted the various difficulties of initial attack (including steep terrain, power lines, snags from previous fires, and a drainage aligned with prevailing winds) and assessed the probability of success in direct attack as "difficult but possible." Air tankers arrived by 11:30 a.m., and over the course of the day fixed-wing air tankers dropped 33 loads of fire retardant and helicopters dropped 133,000 gallons of water on the fire. However, the effectiveness of those drops was limited, as the steep terrain and dry/dead fuels led to spotting and roll-out of burning material. The fire was between 25 acres (10 ha) and 50 acres (20 ha) by the end of the first day shift.

On July 30 and 31, firefighters continued to engage in direct attack on the fire as it burned slowly through the footprints of the 2008 Belden Fire and the 2000 Storrie Fire. The fire increased in activity on July 31, spotting from the Chips Creek drainage into the Indian Creek drainage. The fire was estimated at 1,000 acres (400 ha) by the end of the 31st.

=== August ===
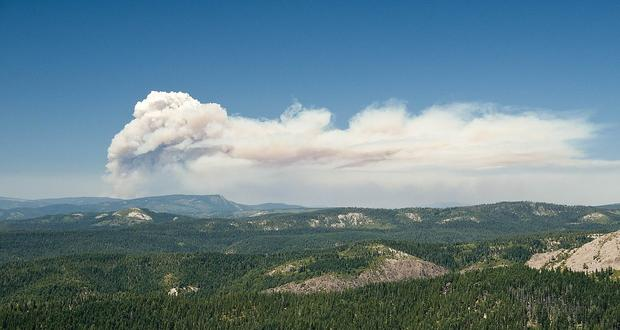
The Chips Fire puts up a smoke column in early August

The Chips Fire remained quite active on August 1. The fire developed a convective column, becoming "plume-dominated" in its behavior, and grew significantly to the north after spotting into the Yellow Creek drainage. More significantly, the fire also spotted 1.5 miles (2.4 km) to the east (over both the primary and proposed secondary contingency lines) onto Caribou Ridge. By the end of the day, the fire was approximately 2,500 acres (1,000 ha).

Satellite views of the burn scar

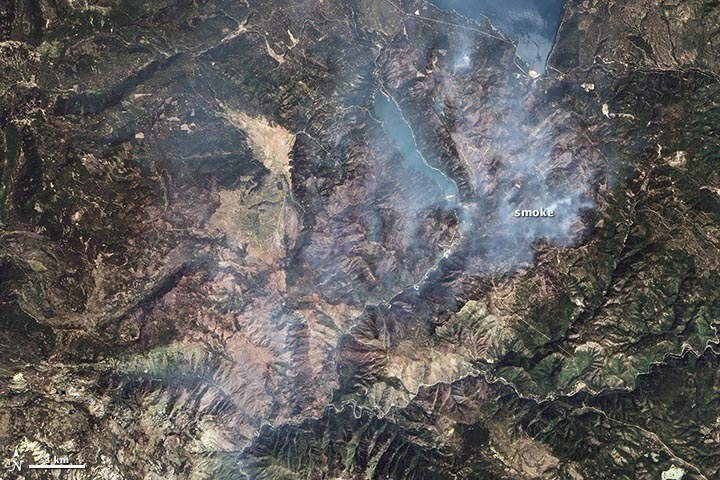
In a natural color image taken Sep. 1, smoke drifts near the eastern edge of the Chips Fire burn scar

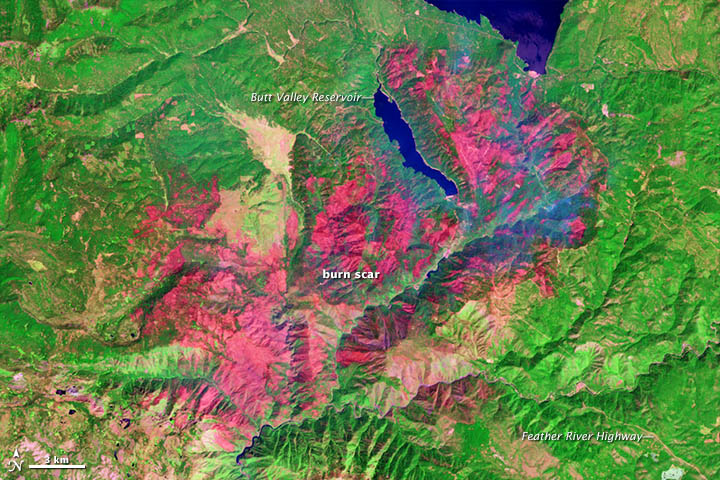
In this simultaneous false-color image, burned vegetation appears red and unburned areas are green

Throughout August, the fire grew steadily, burning over a thousand additional acres on most days. The total area burned reached 10,000 acres (4,000 ha) by August 5, 25,000 acres (10,000 ha) by August 10, and 50,000 acres (20,000 ha) by August 20. The fire occasionally demonstrated more energy: on August 19, the fire spotted across the North Fork Feather River near Ohio Creek. The steep terrain and increased fire activity in this area (Division M, near Seneca and Butt Valley Dam) forced firefighters to withdraw, and the decision was made to retreat to contingency lines and begin firing operations instead of continuing to attack the fire directly.

On August 21, the fire's northeastern side was active, running toward and spotting across Highway 89 near Lake Almanor's spillway at Canyondam. However, more broadly, fire behavior moderated as the Chips Fire entered its third week. Fire crews continued to conduct firing operations to secure the perimeter, mostly at night, and for the most part the lines held (despite a major wind event on August 26).

The Chips Fire was declared 100 percent contained on August 31, but unburned islands of vegetation within the perimeter continued to burn after that date, bringing the fire's total acreage to 75,431 acres (30,526 ha). The temporary flight restriction (TFR) in place over the Chips Fire area was lifted on September 8. The fire suppression effort had involved more than 1,500 people at its height in late August, at a total cost of approximately $55 million. The fire was only exceeded in area that year by the Rush Fire, also in August, in Lassen County.

==== 'Chips' the bobcat ====
On August 25, a handcrew discovered a lone baby bobcat while patrolling and mopping up on the north end of the fire. The dazed four-week-old female kitten would not leave the crew, who after searching for the kitten's mother brought her to the incident command post before she was turned over to the non-profit group Lake Tahoe Wildlife Care. Dubbed 'Chips', the bobcat was placed with another orphaned bobcat of the same age. After more than seven months of rehabilitation, Chips was released the following spring in Humboldt County.

== Effects ==
Before and after
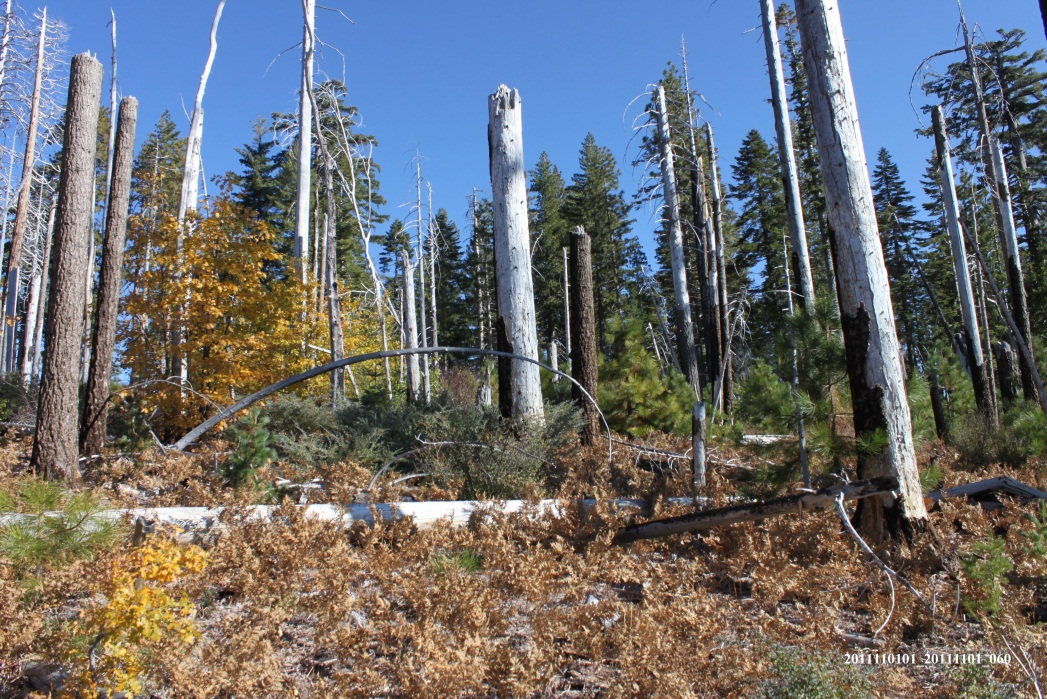
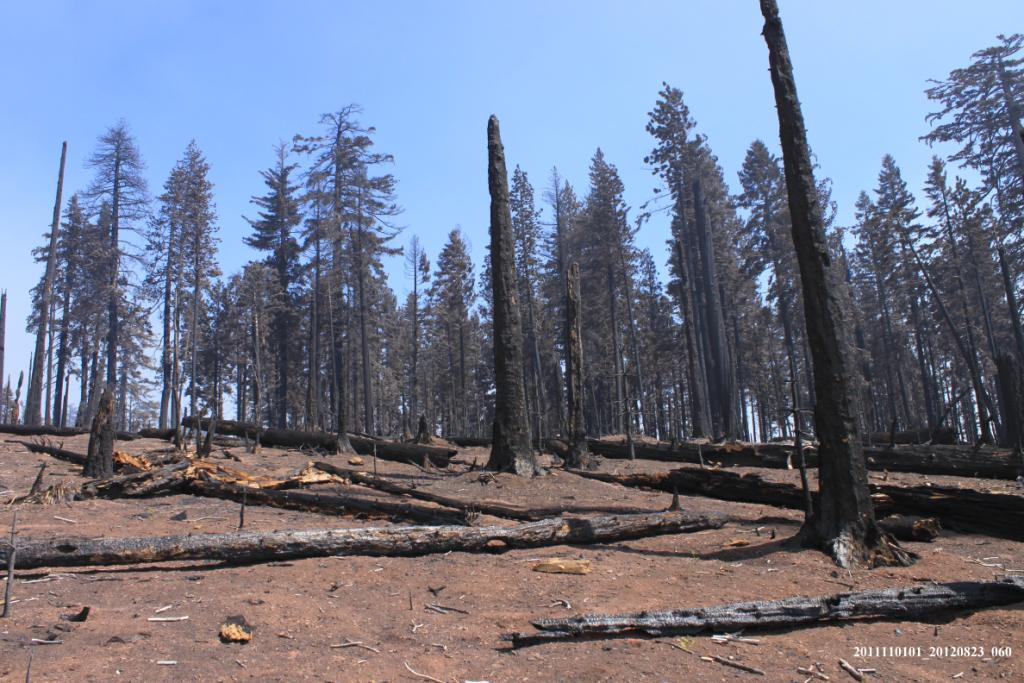

The Chips Fire caused no fatalities. A number of injuries occurred, including a faller who was struck on the head and knocked unconscious by a large dead limb from a burnt snag he was in the process of taking down. The faller was quickly transported to a Chico medical facility and was released the same day.

The Chips Fire destroyed nine structures. The fire also damaged electricity distribution lines for the community of Quincy and the general Eastern Feather River area.

The stretch of the Pacific Crest Trail between Belden and Highway 36 closed on July 29, the first day of the fire. The trail re-opened in the fire area by September 13, 2012.

During the Chips Fire, Cal Fire crews set backfires to clear underbrush and lessen the odds of higher-severity wildfire on the slopes above Humbug Valley, a large meadow complex southwest of Lake Almanor. Following the fire, PG&E conducted salvage logging on 368 acres (149 ha) of its property in the valley, which had historically been an ancestral home of the extant Maidu native people, who called it Tásmam Koyóm. Members of the Maidu Summit Consortium (which includes tribal authorities and non-profit/grassroots organizations) protested, noting that the group had not received the notice required by law before the logging and that two Maidu archaeological sites had been damaged by the process, in addition to the clear-cutting. PG&E denied any damage had occurred, but apologized and suspended logging until Maidu representatives could survey the area for other archaeological sites.

== See also ==
- Glossary of wildfire terms
- Dixie Fire (2021)
- Moonlight Fire (2007)
