= 2000 California wildfires =

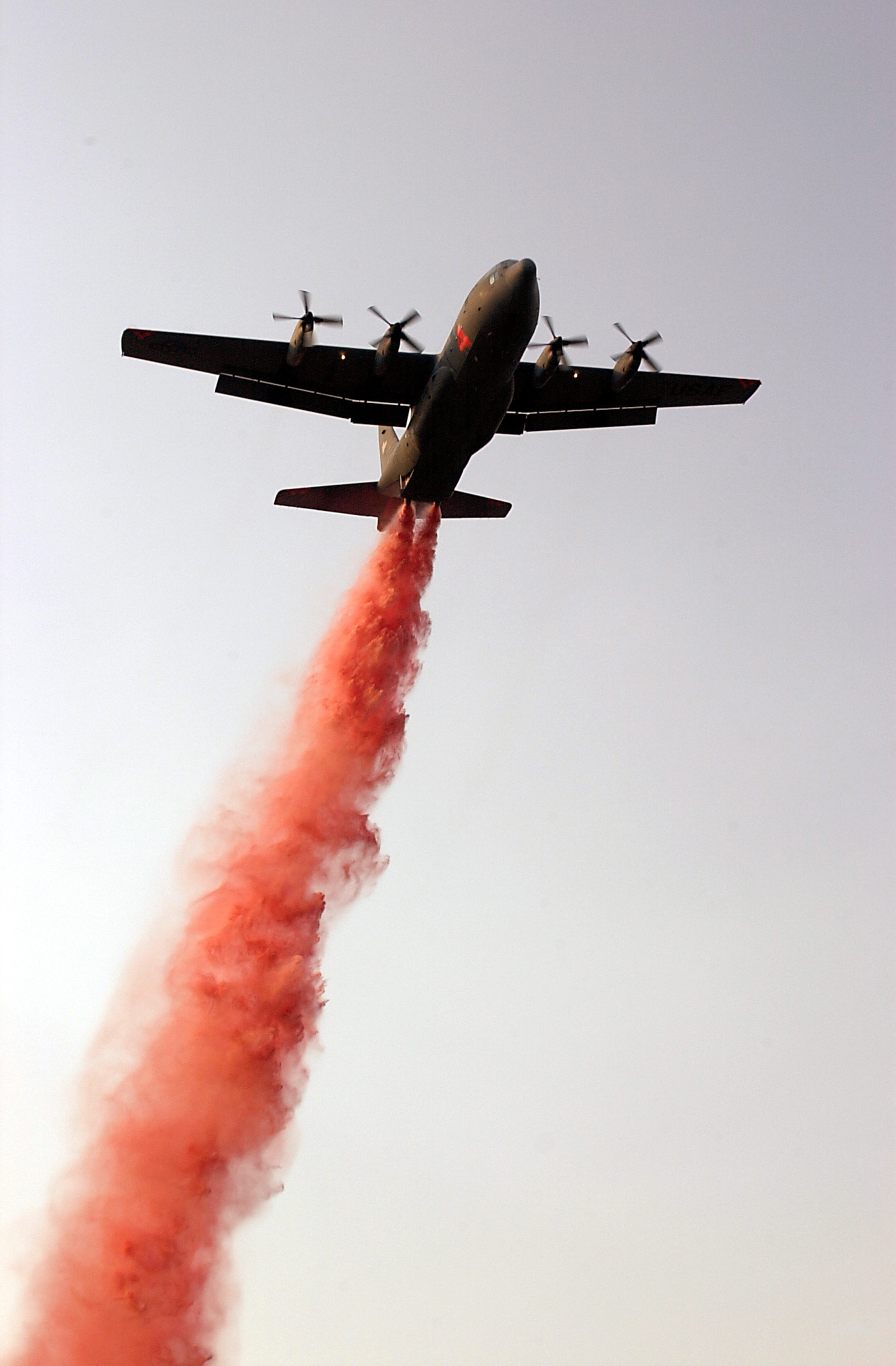
- A C-130 Hercules drops Phos-Chek fire retardant on the Manter Fire in Sequoia National Forest on July 31, 2000

Statistics
- Total fires: 7,622
- Total area: 295,026 acres 119,393 ha

Impacts
- Deaths: 1+
- Structures lost: 130+
- Cost: US$154 million ($124m in suppression costs and $29.9m in damages, per Cal Fire estimates)

According to California Department of Forestry and Fire Protection (Cal Fire) statistics, 7,622 wildfires burned a total of 295,026 acres (119,393 hectares) in the US state of California in 2000. Cal Fire wildfire suppression costs for fires that burned within the agency's jurisdiction amounted to $109 million. Damages for the same amounted to $87.3 million, with a total of 389 structures lost. The largest wildfires of the year in California were the Manter and Storrie fires, which burned 74,000 and 55,000 acres in Tulare and Plumas counties respectively.

== Background ==
The timing of "fire season" in California is variable, depending on the amount of prior winter and spring precipitation, the frequency and severity of weather such as heat waves and wind events, and moisture content in vegetation. Northern California typically sees wildfire activity between late spring and early fall, peaking in the summer with hotter and drier conditions. Occasional cold frontal passages can bring wind and lightning. The timing of fire season in Southern California is similar, peaking between late spring and fall. The severity and duration of peak activity in either part of the state is modulated in part by weather events: downslope/offshore wind events can lead to critical fire weather, while onshore flow and Pacific weather systems can bring conditions that hamper wildfire growth.

== List of wildfires ==
The following is a list of fires that burned more than 1,000 acres (400 hectares), produced significant structural damage or casualties, or were otherwise notable. It is excerpted from Cal Fire's 2001 list of large (≥ 300 acres) fires, and may not be complete or reflect the most recent information.

Name	County	Acres	Start date	Containment date (Note: Containment means that fire crews have established and secured control lines around the fire's perimeter. These lines are artificial barriers, like trenches or cleared vegetation, designed to stop the fire's spread, or natural barriers like rivers. Containment reflects progress in managing the fire but does not necessarily mean the fire is starved of fuel, under control, or put out.)	Notes	Ref
Town	Glenn	1,500	March 31, 2000	April 5, 2000	Caused by an escaped controlled burn	
Cabbage	Mendocino	1,540	April 1, 2000	April 5, 2000		
Berryessa	Napa	5,731	June 13, 2000	June 16, 2000	Caused by equipment use; destroyed 15 structures	
Barrett	San Diego	2,000	June 29, 2000	June 30, 2000		
Granite	Mariposa	2,000	July 2, 2000	July 4, 2000	Caused by shooting	
Goat	Lassen	1,084	July 17, 2000	July 20, 2000	Caused by a campfire	
Bark	Siskiyou	1,715	July 21, 2000	July 26, 2000		
Shell	San Luis Obispo	6,300	July 22, 2000			
Plaskett II	Monterey	5,830	July 22, 2000	August 1, 2000	Caused by camper trying to light a stove	
Happy Camp	Inyo	5,500	July 23, 2000	July 28, 2000		
Manter	Tulare	74,439	July 24, 2000	August 9, 2000	At the time the largest recorded fire in Sequoia National Forest; destroyed 15 structures	
Morgan	Lake	3,283	July 26, 2000	July 27, 2000		
Pachenga	Riverside	11,900	July 29, 2000	August 9, 2000		
Golden II	Mono	2,150	August 1, 2000	August 8, 2000	Caused by lightning	
Chance	Kern	1,200	August 1, 2000	August 5, 2000	Caused by lightning	
King	Kern	3,243	August 2, 2000	August 9, 2000	Caused by lightning	
Northfork	San Benito	1,773	August 3, 2000	August 7, 2000	Caused by equipment use	
Romero	Merced	1,200	August 9, 2000	September 9, 2000		
Storrie	Plumas	55,261	August 17, 2000	September 9, 2000	Caused by Union Pacific railroad track repairs	
Hunter	Mariposa	8,084	August 27, 2000	September 4, 2000	Caused by equipment use	
Harris	Santa Barbara	9,700	September 13, 2000	September 18, 2000		
Concow	Butte	1,835	September 19, 2000	September 22, 2000	Caused by equipment use; destroyed 16 structures, killed 1	
Weinstein	Tehama	8,284	September 29, 2000	October 2, 2000	Caused by an escaped controlled burn	
Hidden	Lake	4,500	October 21, 2000	October 27, 2000	Caused by an electrical power system	

== See also ==
- List of California wildfires
