= Ponderosa Fire =

2012 wildfire in Northern California

- Part of the 2012 California wildfires
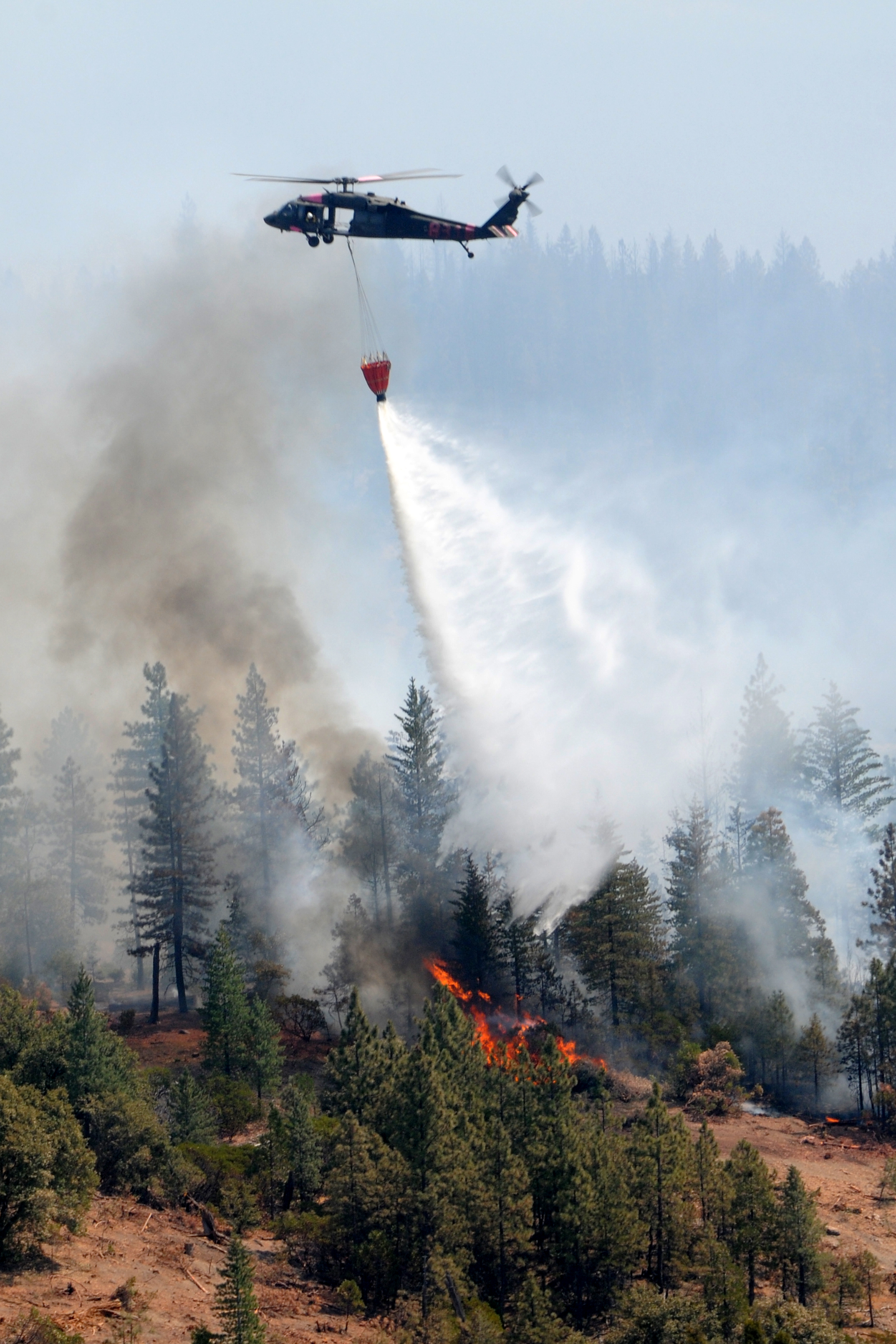
- A California Army National Guard UH-60 Black Hawk helicopter drops a bucket of water on the Ponderosa Fire on August 24
- Date: August 18, 2012 –; August 31, 2012
- Location: Northern California: Tehama County; Shasta County

Statistics
- Burned area: 27,676 acres (11,200 ha; 43 sq mi; 112 km^{2})

Impacts
- Injuries: 7
- Structures destroyed: 52 residences; 81 outbuildings

Ignition
- Cause: Lightning

The Ponderosa Fire was a destructive wildfire during the 2012 California wildfire season. While the fire only burned 27,676 acres (11,200 ha), it destroyed 133 structures, the most of any fire that year for the state. At the height of the fire on August 24, over 2,300 firefighters were involved in the suppression effort, which also included 254 fire engines, 46 bulldozers and 54 water tenders.

The fire started at around 11:30 a.m. PDT, on August 18, 2012. The fire was ignited by a lightning strike west of the community of Manton.
