= Storrie Fire =

2000 wildfire in Northern California

- Part of the 2000 California wildfires
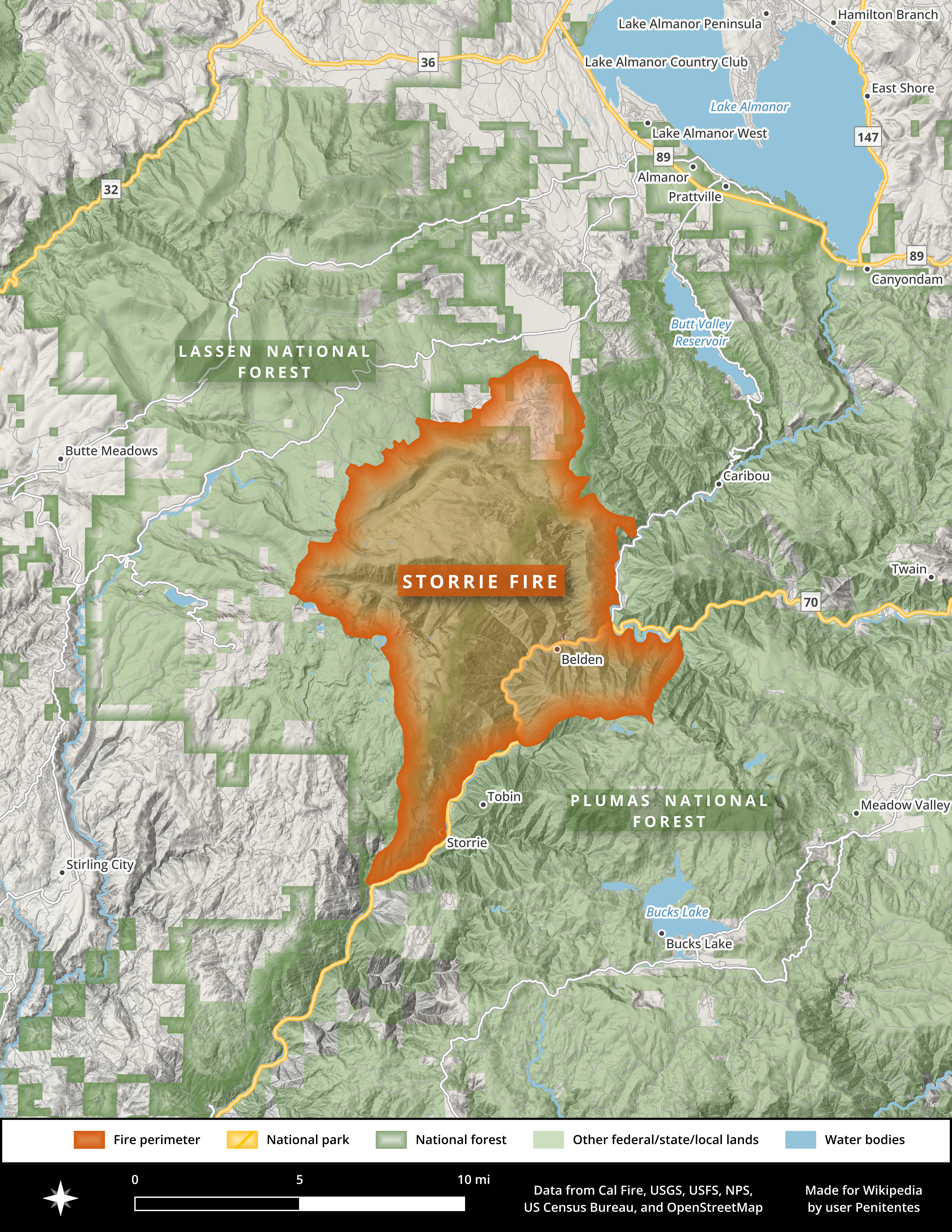
- The Storrie Fire began in the Feather River Canyon and progressed northeast through Plumas and Lassen National Forests.
- Date: August 17 –; September 9, 2000; (24 days)
- Location: Plumas County, Northern California, United States
- Coordinates: 39°55′3″N 121°19′24″W

Statistics
- Burned area: 55,261 acres (22,363 ha; 86 sq mi; 224 km^{2})

Impacts
- Deaths: 0
- Injuries: ≥5
- Structures lost: 1
- Cost: $22 million; (equivalent to about $38 million in 2024)

Ignition
- Cause: Sparks from railroad track repairs

Map
- The Storrie Fire burned in the northern Sierra Nevada, largely in Plumas County.

The Storrie Fire was a sizeable wildfire in Northern California's Plumas County and the second-largest of California's 2000 wildfire season. The fire began on August 17, 2000, and was fully contained by September 9; it burned 55,261 acres (22,363 hectares) in total and resulted in minimal property damage or casualties. The cost of containing the Storrie Fire amounted to $22 million (equivalent to about $38 million in 2024).

The fire was accidentally begun by Union Pacific Railroad workers, who were using a saw tool to repair train tracks in the Feather River Canyon near the community of Storrie. In an effort to recoup the costs of fire suppression as well as damages to federal lands, the U.S. government filed a lawsuit against Union Pacific over the Storrie Fire in 2006. Two years later, after a landmark ruling allowed the government to seek compensation for the full value of the land harmed by the fire, Union Pacific resolved the suit by paying the government a settlement of $102 million.

== Background ==
The Storrie Fire was preceded by a long period of hot and dry conditions. It began and burned within the Feather River Canyon, which runs much of the width of the Sierra Nevada range, winding northeast from Lake Oroville to near Indian Valley and Lake Almanor. The canyon is steep and rugged, in places rising more than 5,000 feet from the Feather River to surrounding peaks.

The Feather River Canyon has played host to many large wildfires since the 1990s besides the Storrie Fire, including the 1999 Bucks Fire, the 2008 BTU Lightning Complex Fire, the 2012 Chips Fire, the 2018 Camp Fire, and the 2021 Dixie Fire. However, in 2000, only 12 percent of the Storrie Fire's total area had ever burned in the previous century. In later years, 45 percent of the Storrie Fire burn area reburned in the Chips Fire, and nearly all of the Storrie Fire burn area reburned in the Dixie Fire.

== Progression ==
=== August 17 ===
The Storrie Fire first ignited on August 17 at about 2:00 p.m. PDT. A five-person Union Pacific crew was conducting track repair work on the Feather River Route in the Feather River Canyon near the community of Storrie, in a rugged and remote area of the northern Sierra Nevada. The work involved using a saw to cut the rail before smoothing the cut with a grinder; the sawing process, later tests showed, could throw small fragments of hot metal nearly 40 feet away. The workers did not employ spark shields and did not clear the area of flammable material. While they were cutting the rail, sparks ignited a bed of dry leaves. The crew made efforts to put out the resulting fire, though their later accounts were inconsistent with each other. Fifteen minutes after they departed, ostensibly believing the fire extinguished, a train came by and the turbulence from its passage fanned the remaining embers.

When the fire was first spotted on a steep slope near Storrie later that afternoon, it was reported as 20 acres (8.1 ha) in size. At 5:20 p.m., officials closed a 40-mile (64 km) section of Highway 70 in the Feather River Canyon between Jarbo Gap and the intersection of Highways 70 and 89. By 8:00 p.m., the fire had burned 200 acres (81 ha).

=== August 18–31 ===
On August 18, the fire grew further, as hot, dry, and windy conditions pushed the fire from 3,500 acres (1,400 ha) to over 5,000 acres (2,000 ha). Because of the steep and dangerous terrain, the nearly 1,000 assembled firefighters were unable to directly tackle the fire. The majority of the effort was instead carried out by nine fixed-wing air tankers and seven helicopters, dropping water and fire retardant. Pacific Gas & Electric (PG&E) de-energized two 230 kV electric power transmission lines to enable the aerial attack. As Forest Service officials warned that the fire was advancing up through the Pacific Crest Trail, Plumas County sheriff's deputies searched for possible hikers or campers in its path on August 18.As the winds pushed the fire north, the station chief for the Plumas National Forest speculated that the fire would burn for "the rest of the summer".

On August 19, windy conditions continued to drive the fire as the burned area more than doubled to about 11,000 acres (4,500 ha). The fire spotted (i.e. started a spot fire) more than one mile (1.6 km) ahead of the main fire front when embers were carried downwind into the Indian Creek drainage. The fire also jumped across the Feather River Canyon and Highway 70 for the first time near Rodgers Flat, beginning to burn in the Bucks Lake Wilderness. Voluntary evacuations were instituted for the Feather River Canyon communities of Belden, Seneca, Caribou Road, and Butt Lake, as well as the Three Lakes Campground near Bucks Lake. By evening the fire was burning in the lower portions of the Chips and Yellow Creek canyons and its perimeter was five percent contained.

On August 20, the fire burned another 6,000 acres (2,400 ha), bringing the total to more than 17,000 acres (6,900 ha). The fire continued to spot ahead of itself, though slackening winds smothered the region in thick smoke and reduced fire activity. Two dozen Forest Service dozers were positioned on the ridge west of the Feather River Canyon should the fire have progressed in that direction. That night more than 20,000 people temporarily lost power from Quincy and Lake Almanor to Susanville when the fire damaged electric power transmission infrastructure. Meanwhile, Highway 70 reopened, and containment of the fire perimeter notched upwards to seven percent. On August 21, the fire grew to more than 20,000 acres (8,100 ha) by late afternoon, though smoky conditions prevailed again as 1,100 firefighters and aircraft continued to tackle the fire. As it continued to burn north towards Lake Almanor, firefighters lit backfires to contain the fire's southwestern perimeter near Storrie and marked the fire 20 percent contained. By August 28, it was about 40,000 acres (16,000 ha) and 62 percent contained.

=== September ===
The Storrie Fire's burned area surpassed 45,000 acres (18,000 ha) by September 5, with more than 5,000 acres (2,000 ha) of that in the Bucks Lake Wilderness. Even as the fire closed to within 10 miles (16 km) of the town of Chester, continued backfires and aircraft operations hampered the fire's progression to the point where the Forest Service declared online "decreased potential for significant fire spread." The fire area also received 0.2 inches (0.51 cm) of rainfall over the Labor Day weekend (September 2 through 4), which aided firefighters.

Some newspapers reported a September 7 containment date, but Forest Service and California Department of Forestry and Fire Protection (Cal Fire) records show a containment date of September 9. The fire's burned area constituted about 6,500 acres (2,600 ha) on the southern side of the Feather River in the Bucks Lake Wilderness area, with the remainder of the fire having burned up the wooded drainages of the Feather River Canyon to the north until stopped by fire crews at the top of the ridge. However, even as the fire remained contained, a previously unscathed 5,000-acre (2,000 ha) 'island' within the perimeter of the fire—near Soda Creek and Soda Ridge—burned, increasing the fire's eventual total area. Responsibility for the fire was returned to Plumas and Lassen National Forests from California Interagency Incident Management Team 2 by September 13, and the fire was fully controlled on September 27. By that point the Storrie Fire had burned 55,261 acres (22,363 ha), requiring more than 2,500 firefighters for fire control and suppression at its peak. It was the second largest wildfire of 2000 in California, surpassed only by the 74,439-acre (30,124 ha) Manter Fire, which burned in the southern Sierra Nevada in late July and early August.

A holdover fire—common in large wildfires—smoldered through the winter inside a Douglas fir snag and ignited on June 12, 2001, before being reported the following day and extinguished one day after that by three handcrews. That fire was confined to a few acres.

== Effects ==
No deaths resulted from the Storrie Fire. Several injuries were reported among firefighters; three were injured on August 17 by falling rocks in the Feather River Canyon that sent at least one to the hospital, and two more developed heat exhaustion.

The Storrie Fire forced the closure of the Pacific Crest Trail between the community of Belden and Humboldt Summit from August 18 until at least September 28. The 40-mile (64 km) portion of Highway 70 between Jarbo Gap and Highway 89 was closed on August 17 and reopened on August 20.

On August 20, the fire damaged transmission lines and transformers, knocking out power to approximately 20,000 homes and businesses for several hours. The fire also damaged dozens of wooden power transmission line poles owned by PG&E in the Feather River Canyon, who were forced to install new poles via helicopters working in concert with ground crews in the steep terrain. Highway 70 sustained damage that necessitated repairs to infrastructure (including culverts, drainage and rock catchment systems, and guardrails), as well as debris removal and erosion controls. Other property damage in the Storrie Fire was limited to a single structure in the Rich Bar area—a shed containing hazardous materials that firefighters said could not be easily protected.

=== Environmental impacts ===
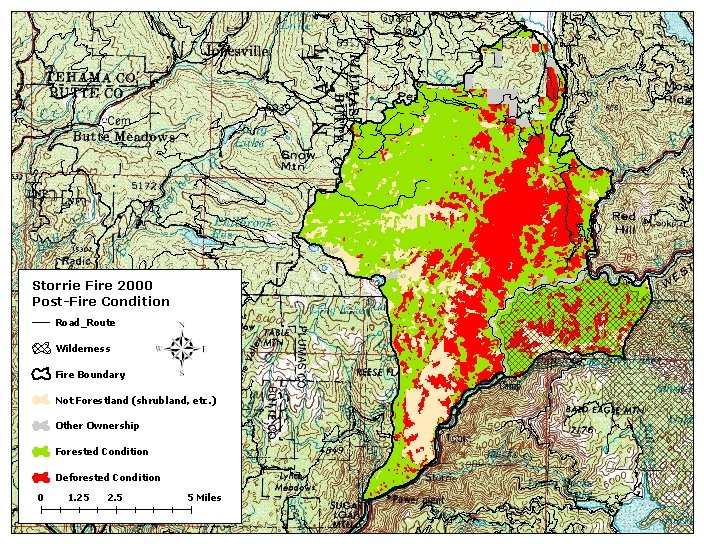
This topographic USFS map of the Storrie Fire shows non-forested land in beige, forests remaining after the fire in green, and deforested areas in red.

Smoke from the Storrie Fire filled much of the Sierra Nevada between Susanville to the fire's northeast and Auburn to the fire's south. On August 21, drifting smoke caused the Northern Sierra Air Quality Management District to issue a health advisory for Plumas, Nevada, and Sierra counties.

Some of the Storrie Fire's footprint reflected higher-severity fire effects; a Forest Service spokesperson said only about 15 percent of the watershed area had "burned intensely" but a 2019 fire severity analysis recorded that "high severity effects accounted for approximately one third of the Storrie Fire area". In October 2000, about a month after the fire, ash in storm runoff from the Storrie Fire area contaminated the holding pond that Belden used as a water source, turning tap water brown and forcing the resort there to temporarily shut down operations.

Multiple proposed post-fire salvage logging operations by the Plumas and Lassen National Forest became hamstrung by environmental concerns. Lassen forest officials proposed to conduct logging on 3,500 acres (1,400 ha) southwest of Lake Almanor. The forest's plan was appealed by several environmental groups, including the Sierra Club, and the appeal was upheld in October 2001 by the Forest Service regional forester for the Pacific Southwest Region over the plan's unproven benefits to fire danger and possible impacts to endangered species, such as the spotted owl and Pacific marten. A similar 1,798-acre (728 ha) Plumas National Forest proposal was rejected the following November after environmental groups appealed. Some environmentalists charged forest officials with attempting to pass healthy trees as doomed so as to log even more, and by the time the projects were approved in August 2002—two years after the fire—the trees in question were beginning to rot and logging companies were disinterested.

== Lawsuit ==
=== Trial ===
In 2006, the U.S. federal government sued Union Pacific for $200 million in damages related to the Storrie Fire. The five crew members whose repair work had started the fire all provided sworn pre-trial testimony. Their accounts of how the group had handled the fire differed: two testified that they had put water on it, two testified that they had not; two testified that they had stomped on it, three testified that they had not. Union Pacific blamed the discrepancies on the length of time between the fire and the government's suit.

In February 2008, during the course of the trial, U.S. district judge Frank C. Damrell Jr. ruled that the government could seek damages beyond just the destruction of timber and the cost of suppressing the fire. The ruling allowed for the government to seek at least $168 million, including for damage to habitat and wildlife, "the area's grandeur", as well as the loss of recreational usage; the judge also ruled that the government could seek reforestation costs. In remarks on the ruling, U.S. Associate Attorney General Kevin J. O’Connor called it a national precedent "that will let us assess the true, inherent value of forest land." Legal experts called the decision to expand the assessment of wildfire impacts beyond timber losses an important development.

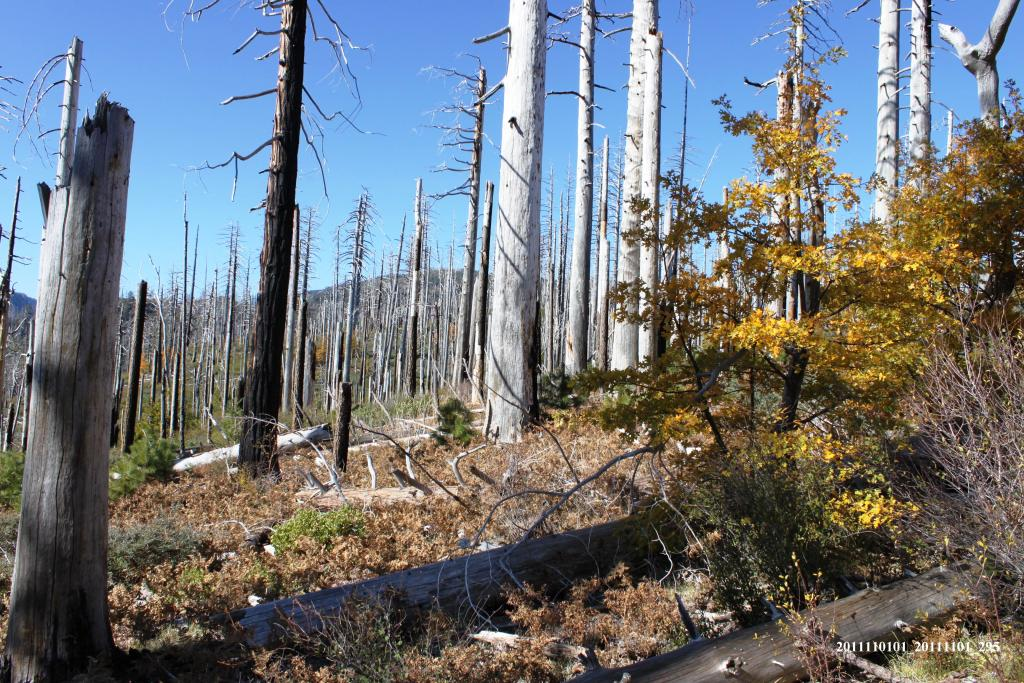
Many tree snags remained in 2011, eleven years after the Storrie Fire.

=== Settlement ===
Union Pacific settled with the federal government in July 2008 for $102 million. The settlement marked the largest recovery in Forest Service history for a wildfire case. The civil settlement was also then the largest ever in the District Court for the Eastern District of California, and U.S. Attorney McGregor W. Scott called it "the most significant civil case in the history of the district." The settlement was scheduled to be paid in three installments of $32–35 million each on July 2, August 15, and October 15, 2008. The money, after recouping costs from the $22 million spent on fire suppression, was directed to the Plumas and Lassen National Forests for alleviation of the ecological damage from the fire.

The settlement was agreed upon without requiring the five Union Pacific workers to admit liability for the Storrie Fire. A Union Pacific spokesperson said that "We feel our employees did all the right things" and called the circumstances of the fire's ignition "extraordinary". In a filing with the Securities and Exchange Commission, Union Pacific noted that the company had incurred a $10 million liability at the time of the fire and that the settlement itself would be paid from insurance proceeds, leaving the company's 2008 earnings and cash flow unaffected.

== See also ==
- Glossary of wildfire terms
- Moonlight Fire (2007)
- North Complex Fire (2020)
