= Barry Point Fire =

2012 wildfire in Oregon and California

- Part of the 2012 California wildfires
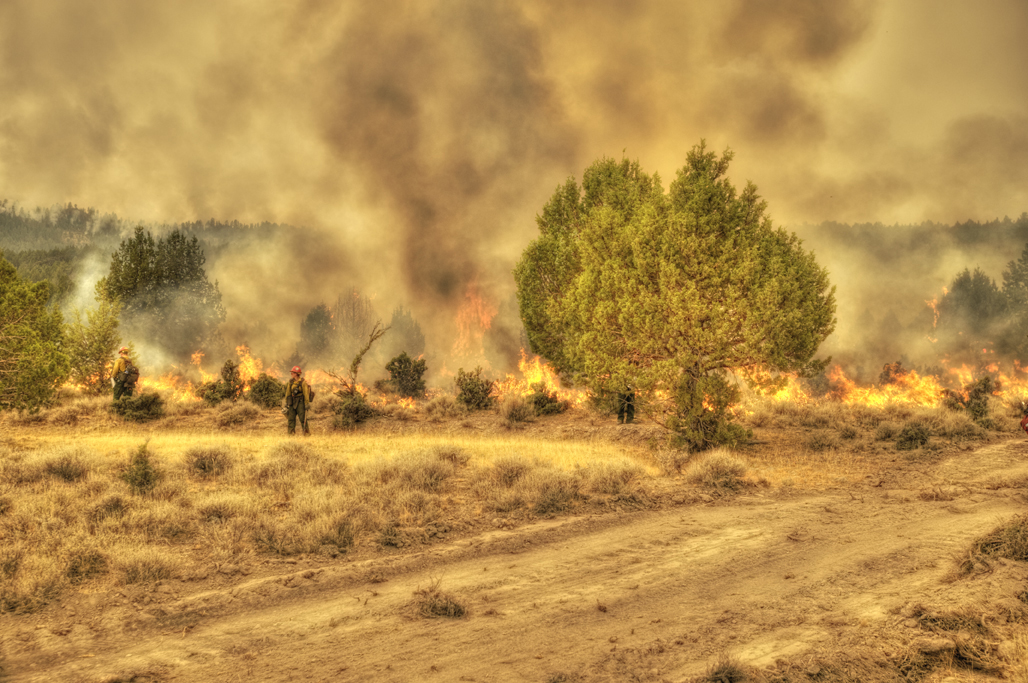
- Firefighters patrolling the fire line
- Date: August 5, 2012 –; August 27, 2012
- Location: Lake County, Oregon & Modoc County, California
- Coordinates: 42.1111°N 120.8018°W

Statistics
- Burned area: 92,977 acres (376 km^{2})

Impacts
- Injuries: 3
- Structures destroyed: 3
- Cost: $23.2 million

Ignition
- Cause: Lightning

Map
- Location of fire in Oregon

The Barry Point Fire was a wildfire that burned over 92,977 acres (376.26 km^{2}) of Oregon and California forest land during the summer of 2012. The fire began on 5 August 2012, the result of a lightning strike. The fire consumed public forest and rangeland as well as private forest and grazing land located in Lake County, Oregon and Modoc County, California. The public lands affected by the fire are administered by the United States Forest Service and the Oregon Department of Forestry. The largest part of the private land was owned by the Collins Timber Company. At the peak of the firefighting effort, there were 1,423 personnel working on the fire. It took 22 days to fully contain the fire and then an additional three weeks to mop it up.

== Origin ==
On 5 August 2012, a thunderstorm passed over southern Oregon and northern California. The storm produced a number of lightning strikes in the Fremont-Winema National Forest. Unfortunately, the storm did not deliver any rain with the lightning. The next morning, a local lookout reported a fire in the Barry Point area, approximately 22 miles (35 km) west of Lakeview, Oregon. The Forest Service named it the Barry Point Fire.

A combination of hot dry weather and gusty winds had created dangerous fire conditions in the Fremont-Winema National Forest. Around Barry Point, the fire conditions were exacerbated by heavy forest ground cover and the general inaccessibility of the area. By mid-morning these conditions had produced a high intensity fire with large trees torching off in rapid succession and numerous spot fires spreading the blaze rapidly. The prevailing winds initially drove the fire toward the northeast. However, the wind then shifted unexpectedly, pushing the fire southward. Firefighters battled the blaze for over three weeks as it consumed large tracts of public forest and rangeland along with private forest and ranch grazing lands.

== Chronology ==
- In the late afternoon on 5 August 2012, a lightning strike ignited a wildfire near Barry Point on the Fremont-Winema National Forest in southern Lake County, Oregon.
- On 6 August 2012, the lookout at Dog Mountain reported the Barry Point Fire to the Lakeview Interagency Fire Center in the late afternoon. At the time, there were already five other fires burning in the general area, and there were more fires in other parts of the Fremont-Winema National Forest and on nearby state forest lands. The initial report estimated the fire to be approximately .25 acres (0.0010 km^{2}). A few minutes later, the lookout reported that the fire had doubled in size and was growing rapidly due to gusty winds in the area. In the meantime, the interagency fire center dispatched ground crews and a helicopter to fight the fire. Within a half-hour, the lookout reported a new spot fire west of the main blaze. When the helicopter arrived on the scene, its pilot reported that the fire was 7 acres (0.028 km^{2}), burning in heavy timber. The helicopter also reported more spot fire up to 300 yards (270 m) ahead of the main fire. Based on that report, the fire center requested air tanker support. There were no large air tankers available, but two smaller retardant planes were dispatched. The air tankers made several drops, but had to retire at dusk. The ground attack continued through the night with hand crews, pumper engines, and bulldozers.
- The next morning, 7 August, fire managers held over the night crews to continue fighting the fire. Additional crews also arrived on scene. The two small retardant planes returned along with helicopter support. Three large air tankers were also assigned to the fire. These air assets were used throughout the day. Nevertheless, the fire continued to expand rapidly with numerous spot fires making line building very difficult. In mid-afternoon, an expanded fire management team was ordered. By late afternoon, the fire was reported to be 500 acres (2.0 km^{2}) and still growing. At the end of the day, the estimate was increased to 1,500 acres (6.1 km^{2}). Late that night, crews began a burnout operation to prevent the fire from spread to the south.
- On the morning of 8 August, fire managers believed the burnout operation conducted during the night had been successful. Air operations were hindered in the morning by bad visibility and aircraft mechanical problems. In the afternoon, air support was resumed. All day, ground crews built fire line. Additional burnout operations were conducted by the day shift crews and were continued by the night shift. This stopped the fire's spread to the north, but was unsuccessful in preventing the fire from spreading up the western slope of Dog Mountain.

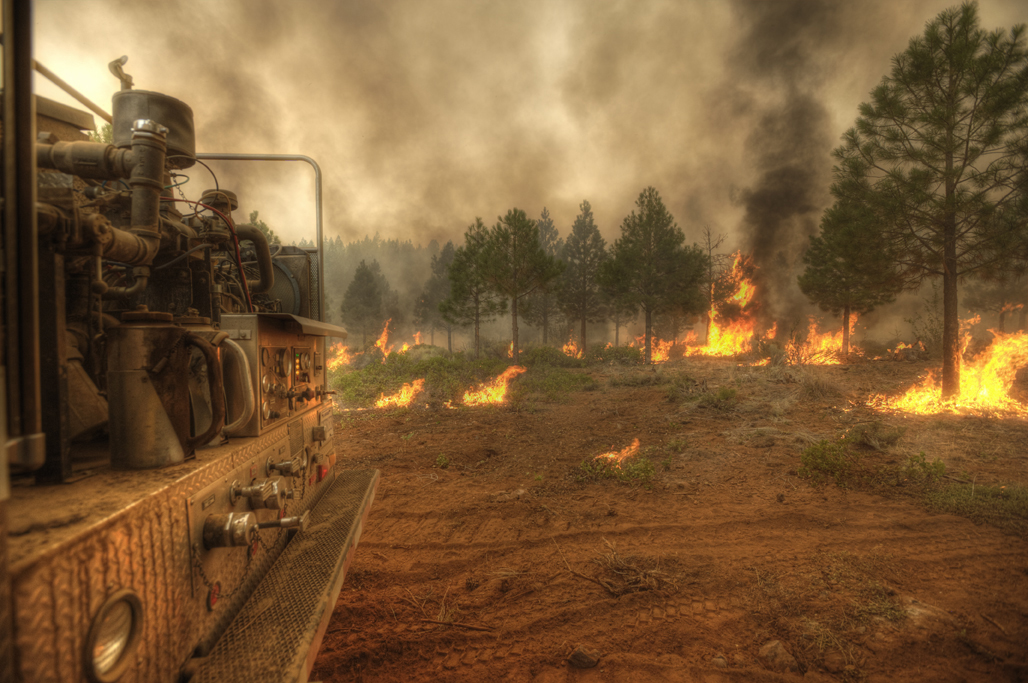
Pumper engine on Barry Point Fire's front line

- Early on 9 August, the fire was reported to be 3,000 acres (12 km^{2}), but it was only 25 percent contained. Command of the fire suppression operation was transitioned to an expanded Oregon Interagency Incident Management Team. In addition the Oregon Department of Forestry dispatched two pumper engines and 12 overhead personnel to the fire. During the day, the fire spread to the northeast and began burning the west face of Dog Mountain. At that time, the fire was reported to be 4,500 acres (18 km^{2}). In the afternoon, the blaze jumped a fire line and spread northeast toward Drew's Reservoir. As a result, an evacuation notice was issued for residents living along south side of the reservoir. However, the wind shifted driving the fire to the south, up the east slope of Dog Mountain. By the end of the day, the fire had grown to 11,813 acres (47.81 km^{2}). That included approximately 2,700 acres (11 km^{2}) of state protected land.
- The fires continued to burn actively on 10 August, fire managers requested an overhead support team from National Incident Management Organization to assist in planning and oversight of fire operations. During the day, northerly winds pushed the fire to the south and southeast. By the end of the day the fire was reported to be over 17,200 acres (70 km^{2}).
- Between 11 August and 13 August, the prevailing wind direction shifted a number of times. During the day it generally blew from the west and southwest. At night, the winds were predominantly from the northeast and east, which is very unusual for south central Oregon. The wind speed averaged about 10 miles per hour (16 km/h) with gusts up to 15 miles per hour (24 km/h). As a result, the fire continued to spread to the south. On 11 August, the fire covered 28,402 acres (114.94 km^{2}) with over 1,100 firefighters battling the flames. On 12 August, the fire continued to burn very actively. By the end of the day, the fire had grown to 30,824 acres (124.74 km^{2}). The next day it was 45,484 acres (184.07 km^{2}) and the number of firefighters on the scene reached 1,423.

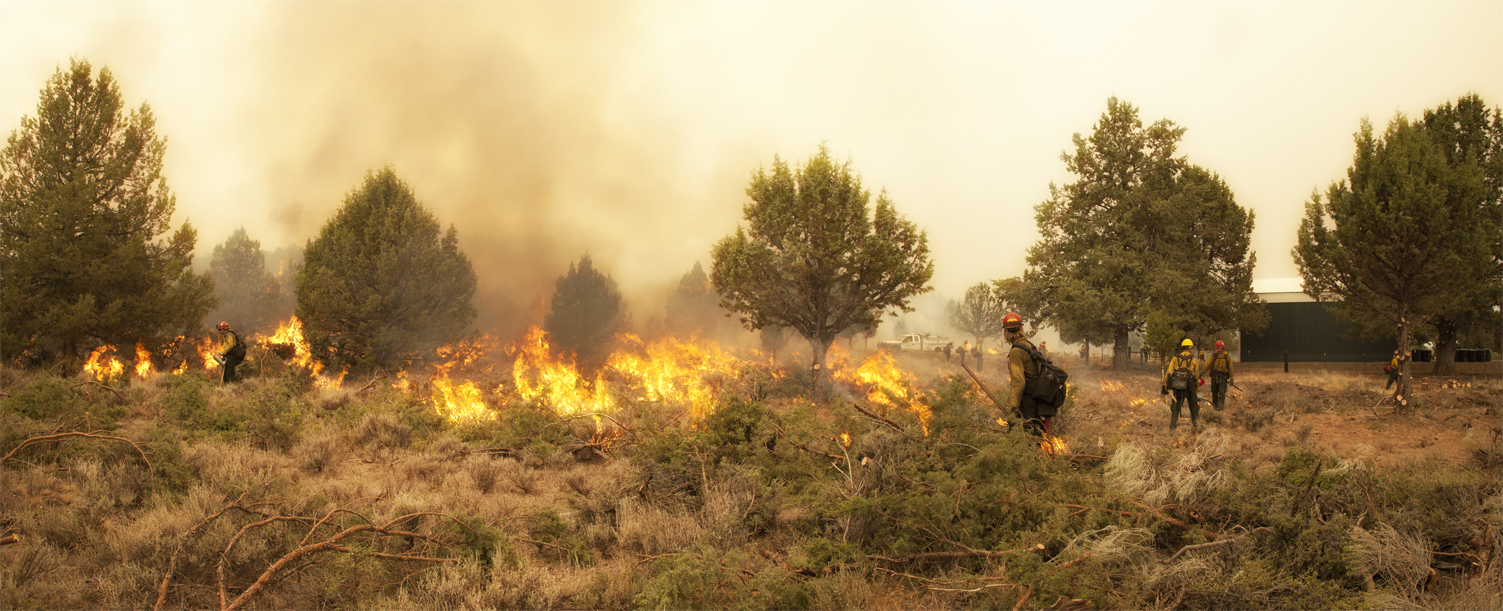
Firefighter working to protect structures on 16 August

- By 14 August, the fire was burning intensely on private timberland west of Lakeview. The extreme fire conditions were also threatening approximately 200 structures including residences in the small unincorporated community of Westside. To help protect these structures the number of firefighters had grown to 1,404. That day, the fire grew by approximately 29,084 acres (117.70 km^{2}). By the end of the day, the total acreage burned was over 74,568 acres (301.77 km^{2}) and the fire had crossed the state line into the Modoc National Forest in California.
- From 15 August and 17 August, the fire continued to spread further south. On 15 August, the fire grew by about 9,223 acres (37.32 km^{2}). Firefighters saved the Crowder Flat Guard Station and Willow Creek Ranch by building fire lines around the structures. Evacuation orders remained in place for the Westside community, the area southeast of Drew's Reservoir, and property west of Goose Lake. Additional evacuations occurred south of the Oregon border. The fire continued to grow as gusty and erratic winds arrived with a new storm on 17 August. However, the storm also brought light precipitation in some areas. By the end of 17 August, the fire had consumed 92,629 acres (374.86 km^{2}), but it was only 30 percent contained.
- On 18 August and 19 August, fire conditions continued to moderate with reduced wind and cooler temperatures. This allowed firefighters to make good progress toward containing the fire. Crews continued to build and strengthen containment lines while mop up operations began in some area. Forest Service tree fallers began cutting hazardous snag trees along the fire line at the north end of the burn. Most evacuations orders were lifted on 19 August.

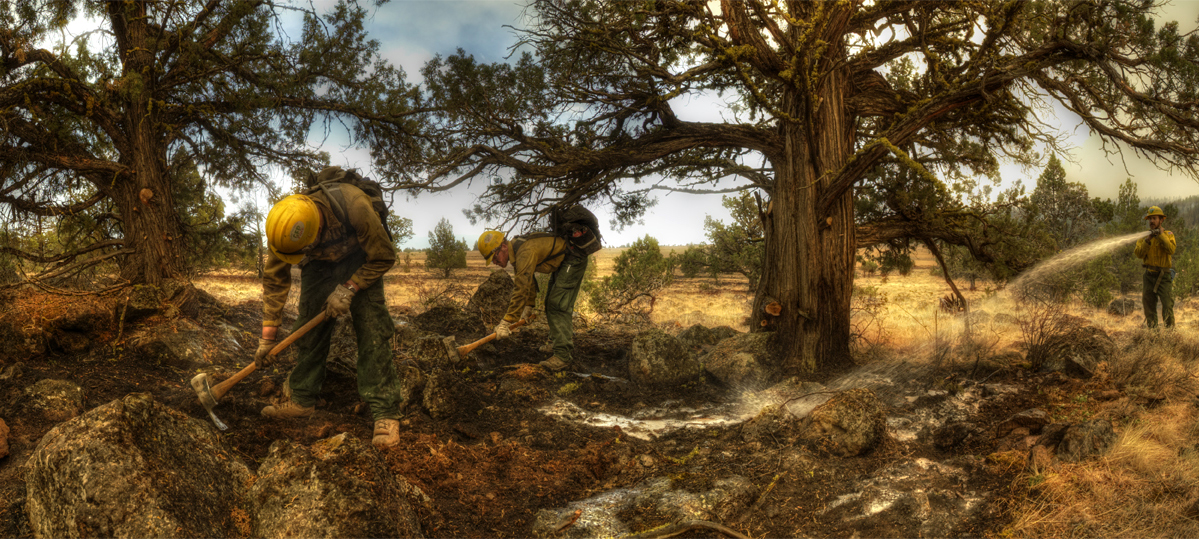
BLM ground crew conducting mop up operations

- From 20 August and 26 August, the fire continued to burn inside fire lines, but did not grow beyond established lines. On 20 August, there were still 1,256 personnel working on the fire. The southeast front of the fire remained active during the day with individual trees continued to torch off in some interior area. At the end of the day, the total acreage burned was estimated to be 93,231 acres (377.29 km^{2}). On 24 August, fire managers announced that the Barry Point Fire was 90 percent contained with 775 firefighters still working on the fire. The next day, the fire was 95 percent contained and the number of personnel on scene had been reduced to 632. During this period, the Forest Service resurveyed the fire area and reduced the estimated burn to 93,071 acres (376.64 km^{2}).
- On 27 August, interagency fire management team announced that the fire was 100 percent contained. To accomplish this, approximately 270 miles (430 km) of fire line had been built by ground crews and bulldozers. A large number of firefighters remained on scene to conduct mop up operations. All the remaining evacuation orders were lifted in both Oregon and California, but residents were warned that smoke would persist in the area until all the fuel inside the fire line had finished burning. Forest Service recreation sites, roads, and trails remained closed due to fire mop up activities.
- From 28 August to 17 September, the fire continued to creep and smolder inside the fire line. As of 29 August, 465 firefighters continued to support mop up operations. This included both Forest Service and Oregon Department of Forestry units. Crews worked on repairing fences, culverts, and other infrastructure damaged by fire suppression activities. Ground crews also burned out interior areas with heavy brush that were within 300 feet (91 m) of the perimeter lines. These operations continued for several more weeks as the fire smoldered and crept through unburned islands inside the fire line. By 7 September, there were only 33 firefighters left on scene. The final fire report for the Barry Point Fire was issued on 17 September, highlighting the fact the last crew had left the fire scene.

== Fire area ==
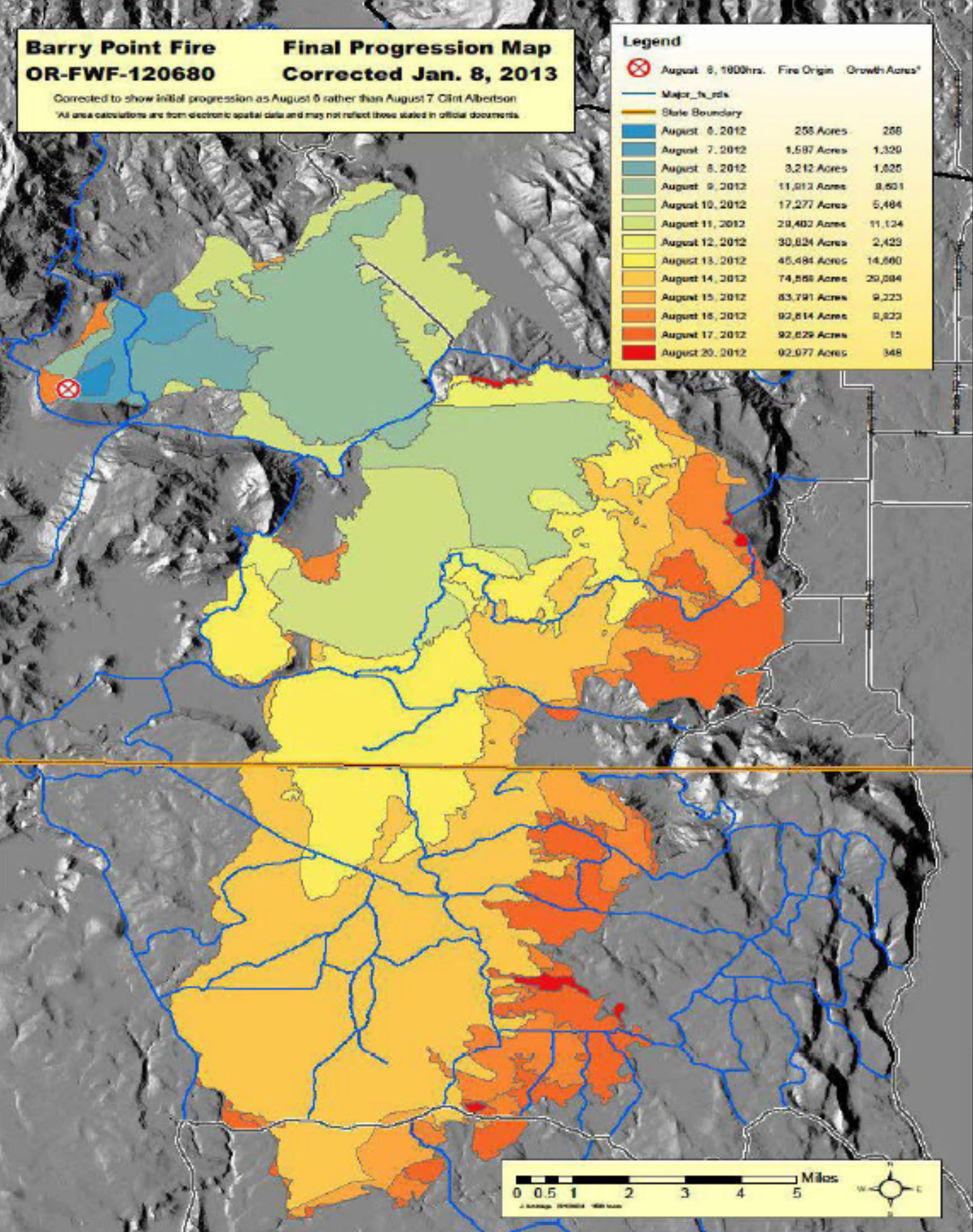
Barry Point Fire progress map

The Forest Service originally reported the final size of the fire to be 93,071 acres (376.64 km^{2}). That was later modified to 92,845 acres (375.73 km^{2}). Most of the burned area was Federal land. However, forest lands belonging to the State of Oregon, and various private owners were also burned. The burned acreage identified in the preliminary fire report was as follows:

- Fromont National Forest, 43,133 acres (174.55 km^{2})
- Modoc National Forest, 16,586 acres (67.12 km^{2})
- Non- Federal Oregon lands, 11,438 acres (46.29 km^{2})
- Non- Federal California lands, 21,688 acres (87.77 km^{2})

After carefully mapping the burned area, the Forest Service changed the official total of acres burned to 92,977 acres (376.26 km^{2}). The fire covered about 30 miles (48 km) north to south and was 10 miles (16 km) wide in some places. Approximately 40,000 acres (160 km^{2}) of commercial timber was consumed by the fire with a 75 percent tree mortality. An addition 35,000 acres (140 km^{2}) of forest was seriously damaged.

During the course of the Barry Point Fires, there were 3 structures destroyed and 3 firefighters injured. According to the Forest Service, the total cost of the fire suppression effort was over $23.2 million.

== Post-fire activity ==
Forest restoration began immediately after the fire was contained. The Fremont-Winema and Modoc national forests appointed a joint Burned Area Emergency Rehabilitation Team to oversee forest restoration activities. Under the team's supervision, Forest Service and Oregon Department of Forestry crews cleared roads, mended fences, repaired culverts, and rehabilitated bulldozer trails.

Timber salvage operations began shortly after the fire suppression ended. The Forest Service worked with the Collins Timber Company and the Fremont sawmill in Lakeview to remove dead trees that were still marketable. However, the salvage process was not an easy one. In September 2012, the Fremont-Winema National Forest offered to sell 25 million board feet of salvage timber to Collins. This was because Collins operated the only sawmill in Lakeview, the nearest mill to the salvage area. However, Collins declined to buy the Forest Service timber, choosing instead to focus on salvaging its own burned timber first. Then in December 2012, the Forest Service offered its salvage timber in a sale open to all bidders, but there were no interested parties. This was due to concerns about the quality of the damaged timber and the distance it would have to be transported. Finally, the Forest Service broke the timber sale into smaller lots near existing roads. By then, Collins had removed much of its burned timber so they acquired some of the Forest Service salvage timber. Ultimately, the Forest Service only salvaged about 9 percent of the timber burned by the Barry Point Fire.

After salvage logging and clearing burned areas, the Forest Service began replanting trees in the Barry Point burn. In 2014, the initial reforestation effort covered about 5,000 acres (20 km^{2}) with ponderosa pine seedlings. An additional 3,668 acres (14.84 km^{2}) was replanted in 2015.

In 2015, Collins replanted over 20,000 acres (81 km^{2}) of timberland as part of a joint forest restoration project with the Wildlife Conservation Board and the Pacific Forest Trust. The project included a $2.5 million grant for wildlife habitat restoration from the conservation groups. In exchange for the grant, Collins and another timber company agreed to offer a conservation easement across 32,686 acres (132.28 km^{2}) of private land, including approximately 10,000 acres (40 km^{2}) unburned forest and meadow lands in northern California. The conservation project will restore habitat for numerous resident and migratory species that are native to northeastern California. Species include mule deer, pronghorn, Rocky Mountain elk, American black bear, and cougar along with bird species such as black-backed woodpeckers, great grey owls, sandhill cranes, goshawks, and bald eagles. Native redband trout will also benefit from the restoration project.

== Images ==
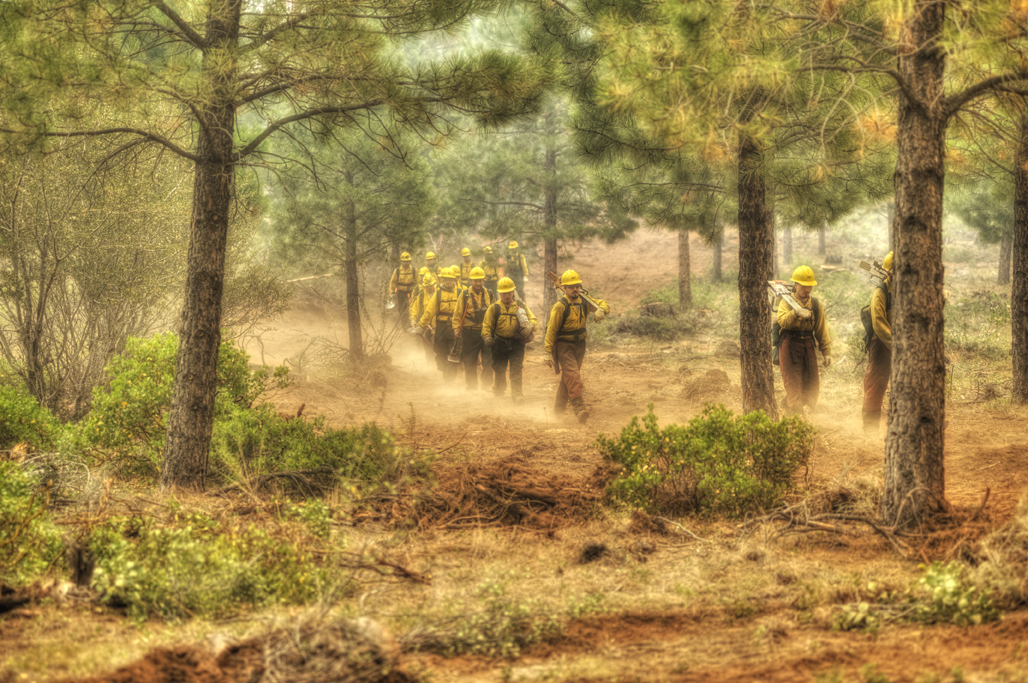
*Crew arriving on line

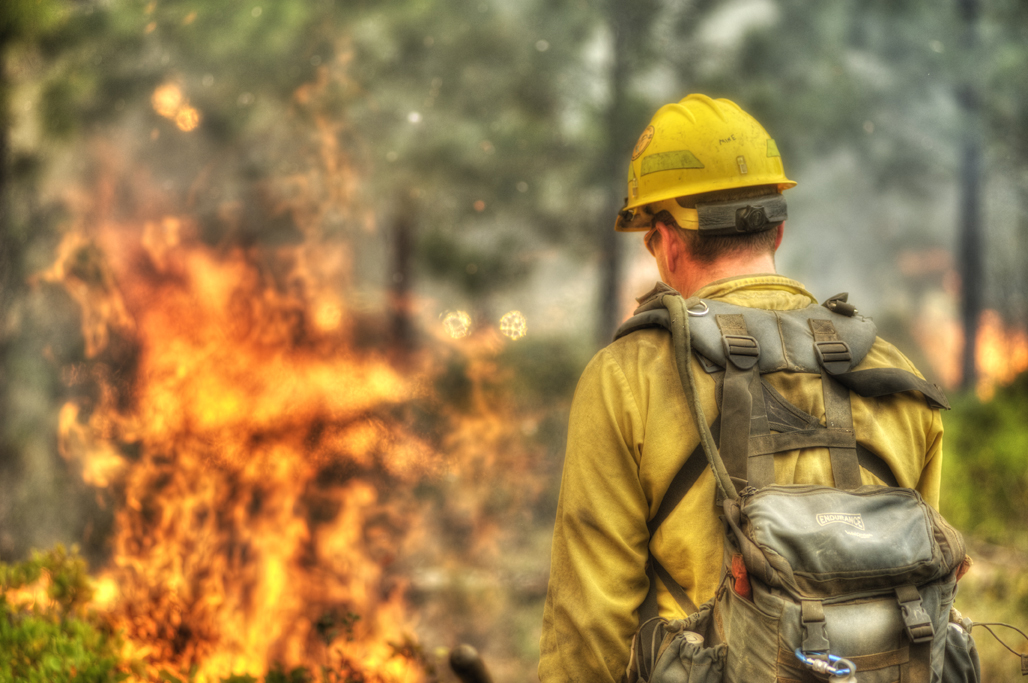
*Front line firefighter

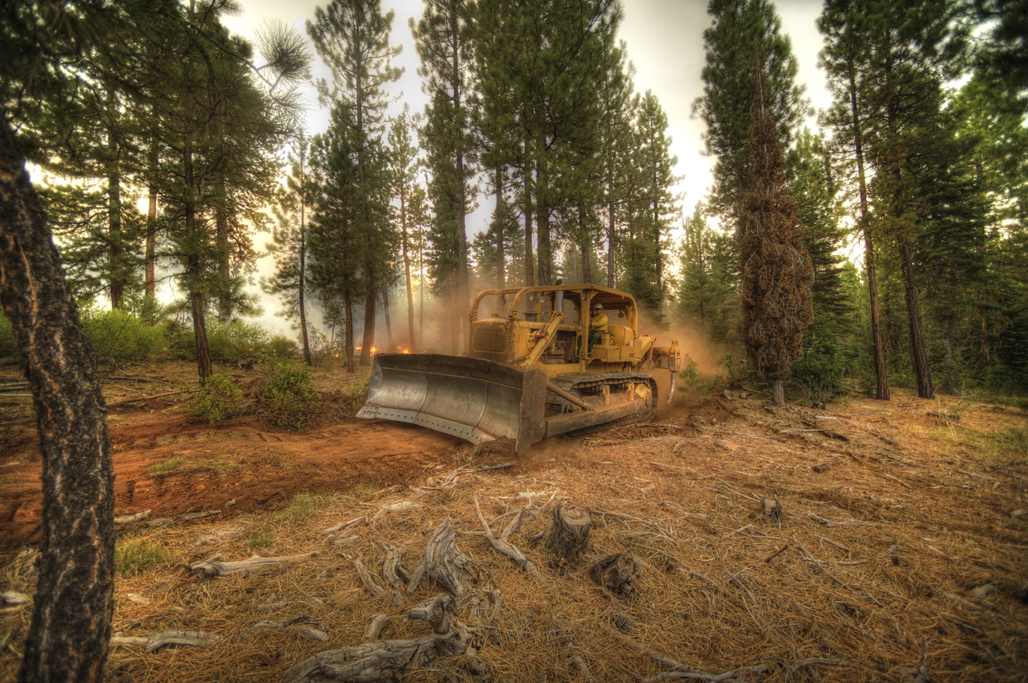
*Bulldozer building line

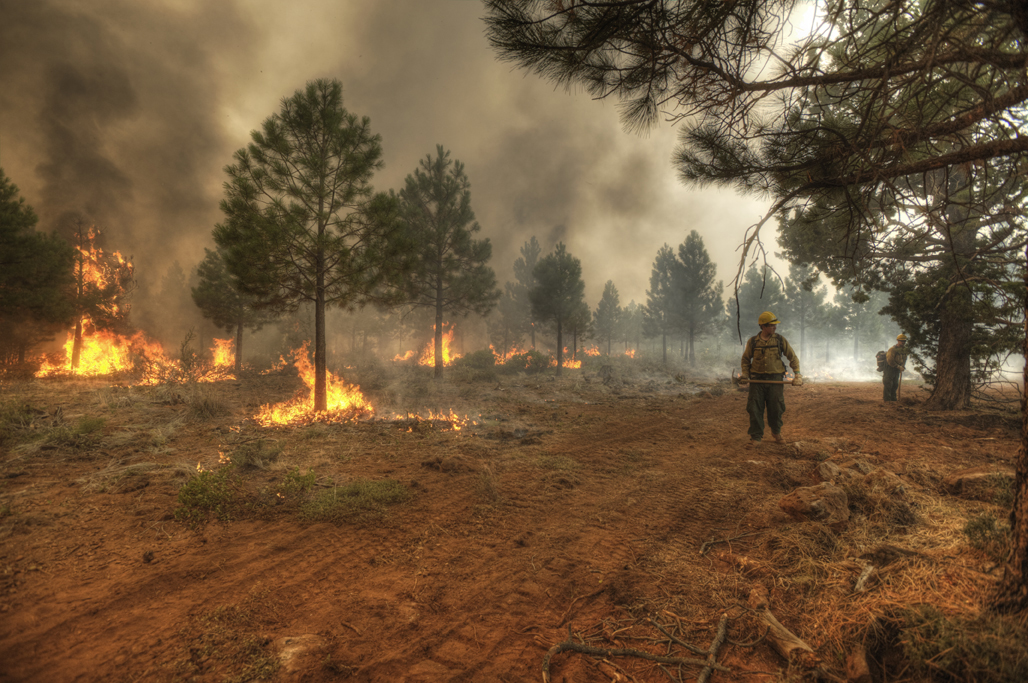
*Fire line patrol

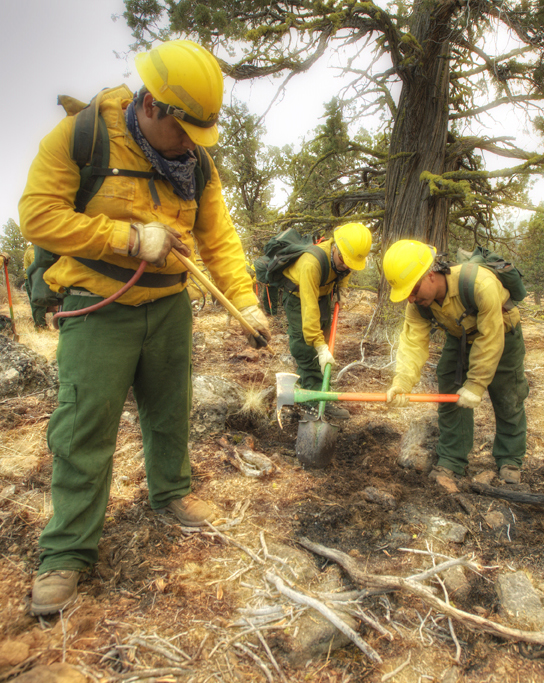
*Mop up activity
