= 2012 California wildfires =

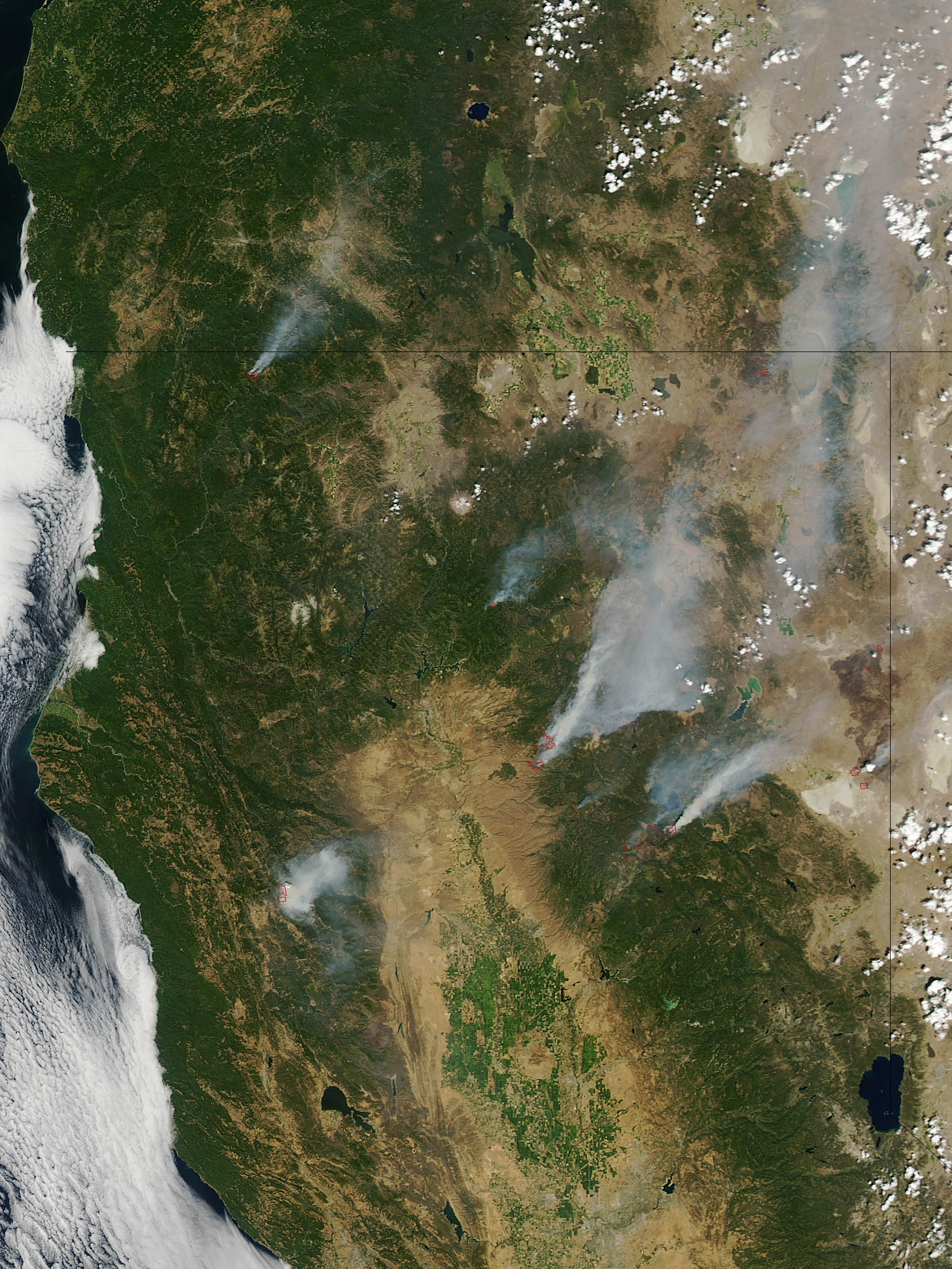
1	North Pass Fire
2	Fort Complex Fire
3	Bagley Fire
4	Ponderosa Fire
5	Chips Fire
6	Rush Fire
Wildfires burn in Northern California in an image taken by NASA's Aqua satellite on August 19, 2012.

Statistics
- Total fires: 7,950
- Total area: 869,599 acres (3,519.14 km^{2})

Impacts
- Deaths: None reported
- Injuries: Unknown
- Cost: >$338.21 million (2012 USD)

Map
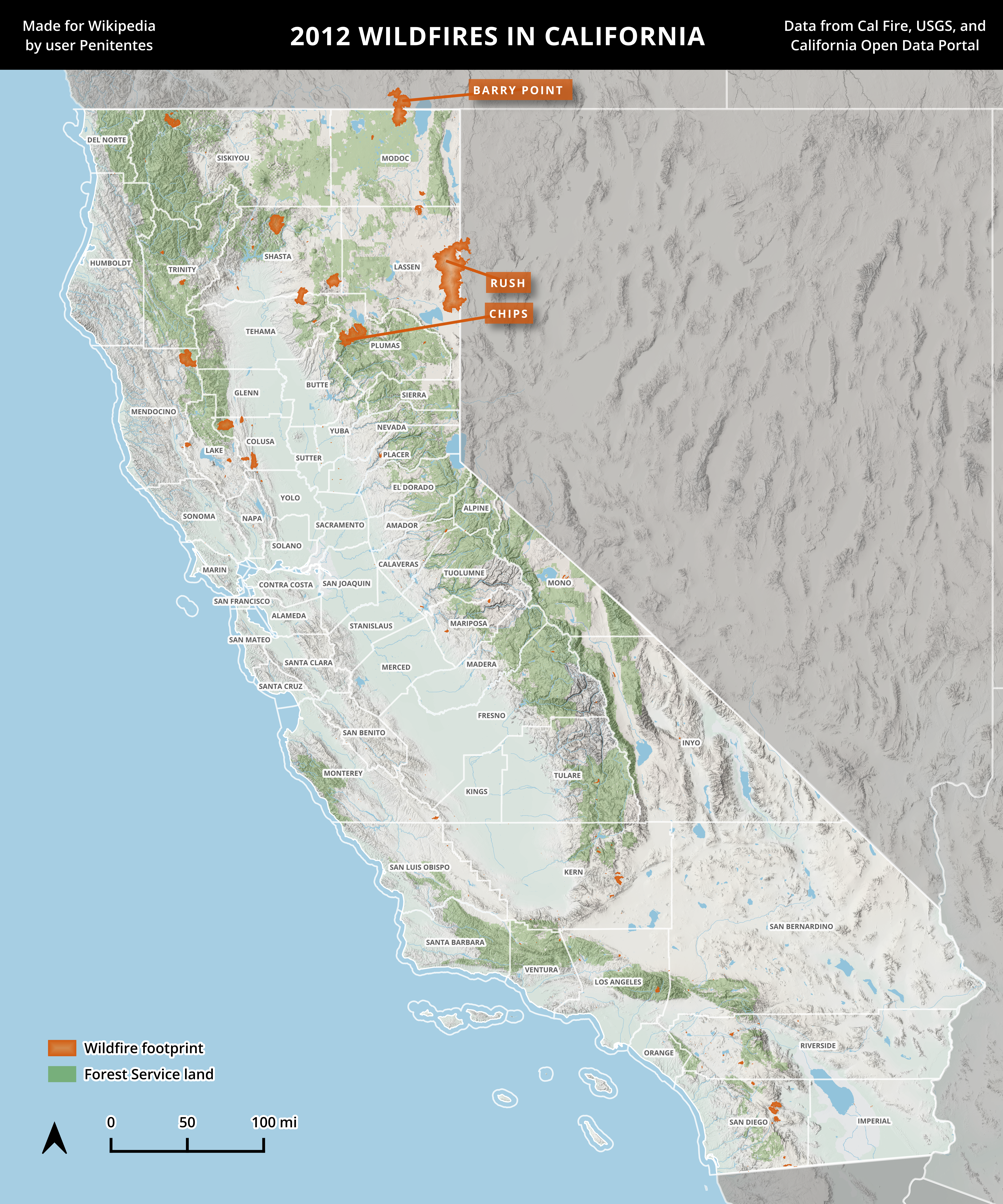
- A map of wildfires in California in 2012, using Cal Fire data

In 2012, 7,950 wildfires burned a total of 869,599 acres (3,519.14 km^{2}) in the US state of California; these included the massive Rush Fire, which was the tenth-largest wildfire recorded in California in modern times, and the Ponderosa Fire, which destroyed 133 structures. The California Department of Forestry and Fire Protection (Cal Fire) incurred fire suppression costs of US$310 million between July 2012 and June 2013, in addition to wildfire damages of $28.2 million.

== Background ==
The timing of "fire season" in California is variable, depending on the amount of prior winter and spring precipitation, the frequency and severity of weather such as heat waves and wind events, and moisture content in vegetation. Northern California typically sees wildfire activity between late spring and early fall, peaking in the summer with hotter and drier conditions. Occasional cold frontal passages can bring wind and lightning. The timing of fire season in Southern California is similar, peaking between late spring and fall. The severity and duration of peak activity in either part of the state is modulated in part by weather events: downslope/offshore wind events can lead to critical fire weather, while onshore flow and Pacific weather systems can bring conditions that hamper wildfire growth.

== List of wildfires ==
The following is a list of the wildfires that burned more than 1,000 acres (400 hectares), produced significant structural damage or casualties, or were otherwise notable. It is excerpted from Cal Fire's 2012 list of large (≥ 300 acres) fires, and may not be complete or reflect the most recent information.

Name	County	Acres	Km^{2}	Start date	Contained Date (Note: Containment means that fire crews have established and secured control lines around the fire's perimeter. These lines are artificial barriers, like trenches or cleared vegetation, designed to stop the fire's spread, or natural barriers like rivers. Containment reflects progress in managing the fire but does not necessarily mean the fire is starved of fuel, under control, or put out.)	Notes
Banner	San Diego	5,320	21.5	May 24, 2012	May 29, 2012	
George	Tulare	1,707	6.9	June 1, 2012	June 15, 2012	
Gaines	Mariposa	1,700	6.9	June 12, 2012	June 14, 2012	
Highland	Riverside	2,171	8.8	June 16, 2012	June 18, 2012	
Cascade	Mariposa	1,705	6.9	June 16, 2012	November 26, 2012	
Dale	Shasta	1,083	4.4	July 5, 2012	July 7, 2012	2 structures destroyed
Fish	Inyo	1,103	4.5	July 7, 2012	July 9, 2012	
Mill	Colusa	29,502	119.4	July 7, 2012	July 18, 2012	5 structures destroyed
Grapevine	Colusa	1,870	7.6	July 8, 2012	July 12, 2012	
Rail	Colusa	1,870	7.6	July 9, 2012	July 12, 2012	
Turkey	Monterey	2,529	10.2	July 9, 2012	July 20, 2012	
Robbers	Placer	2,650	10.7	July 11, 2012	July 21, 2012	8 structures destroyed
Flat	Trinity	1,688	6.8	July 11, 2012	July 17, 2012	
Sand	Kern	1,428	5.8	July 14, 2012	July 19, 2012	1 structure destroyed
Spanish	Lassen	1,169	4.7	July 18, 2012	July 21, 2012	
Reading	Shasta	28,079	113.6	July 23, 2012	August 21, 2012	
Chips	Plumas	75,217	304.4	July 29, 2012	August 31, 2012	9 structures destroyed
Rushmore	Riverside	1,000	4.0	August 4, 2012	August 4, 2012	
Piute Comlex	Kern	1,783	7.2	August 4, 2012	August 11, 2012	
Lake Complex	Modoc	1,668	6.8	August 5, 2012	August 9, 2012	
Fort Complex	Siskiyou	23,653	95.7	August 5, 2012	September 10, 2012	
Barry Point	Modoc	38,394	155.4	August 6, 2012	August 28, 2012	3 structures destroyed
Indian	Mono	12,574	50.9	August 8, 2012	August 15, 2012	
Chihuahua	San Diego	2,006	8.1	August 9, 2012	August 12, 2012	
Jawbone Complex	Kern	1,218	4.9	August 10, 2012	August 22, 2012	19 structures destroyed
Ramsey	Calaveras	1,137	4.6	August 11, 2012	August 31, 2012	
Wye	Lake	2,934	11.9	August 12, 2012	August 18, 2012	3 structures destroyed
Walker	Lake	5,000	20.2	August 12, 2012	August 14, 2012	
Rush	Lassen	271,911	1,100.4	August 12, 2012	August 31, 2012	
Vallecito Lightning Complex	San Diego	22,829	92.4	August 13, 2012	August 20, 2012	
Mill	Tehama	1,641	6.6	August 13, 2012	August 23, 2012	
Buck	Riverside	2,681	10.8	August 14, 2012	August 18, 2012	4 structures destroyed
Nelson	Modoc	3,661	14.8	August 17, 2012	August 21, 2012	
Ponderosa	Tehama	27,676	112.0	August 18, 2012	September 2, 2012	133 structures destroyed
Bagley Complex	Shasta	1,000	4.0	August 18, 2012	August 22, 2012	
North Pass	Mendocino	41,983	169.9	August 18, 2012	September 16, 2012	26 structures destroyed
Bagley	Shasta	46,011	186.2	August 18, 2012	September 15, 2012	
Williams	Los Angeles	4,192	17.0	September 2, 2012	September 11, 2012	
Sixteen Complex	Colusa	19,000	76.9	September 4, 2012	September 11, 2012	
Stafford	Trinity	4,407	17.8	September 5, 2012	September 13, 2012	
Likely	Lassen	9,838	39.8	September 5, 2012	September 14, 2012	
Scotts	Lake	4,517	18.3	September 7, 2012	September 14, 2012	
Shockey	San Diego	2,555	10.3	September 23, 2012	September 27, 2012	39 structures destroyed
