= Reading Fire =

2012 wildfire in Northern California

- Part of the 2012 California wildfires
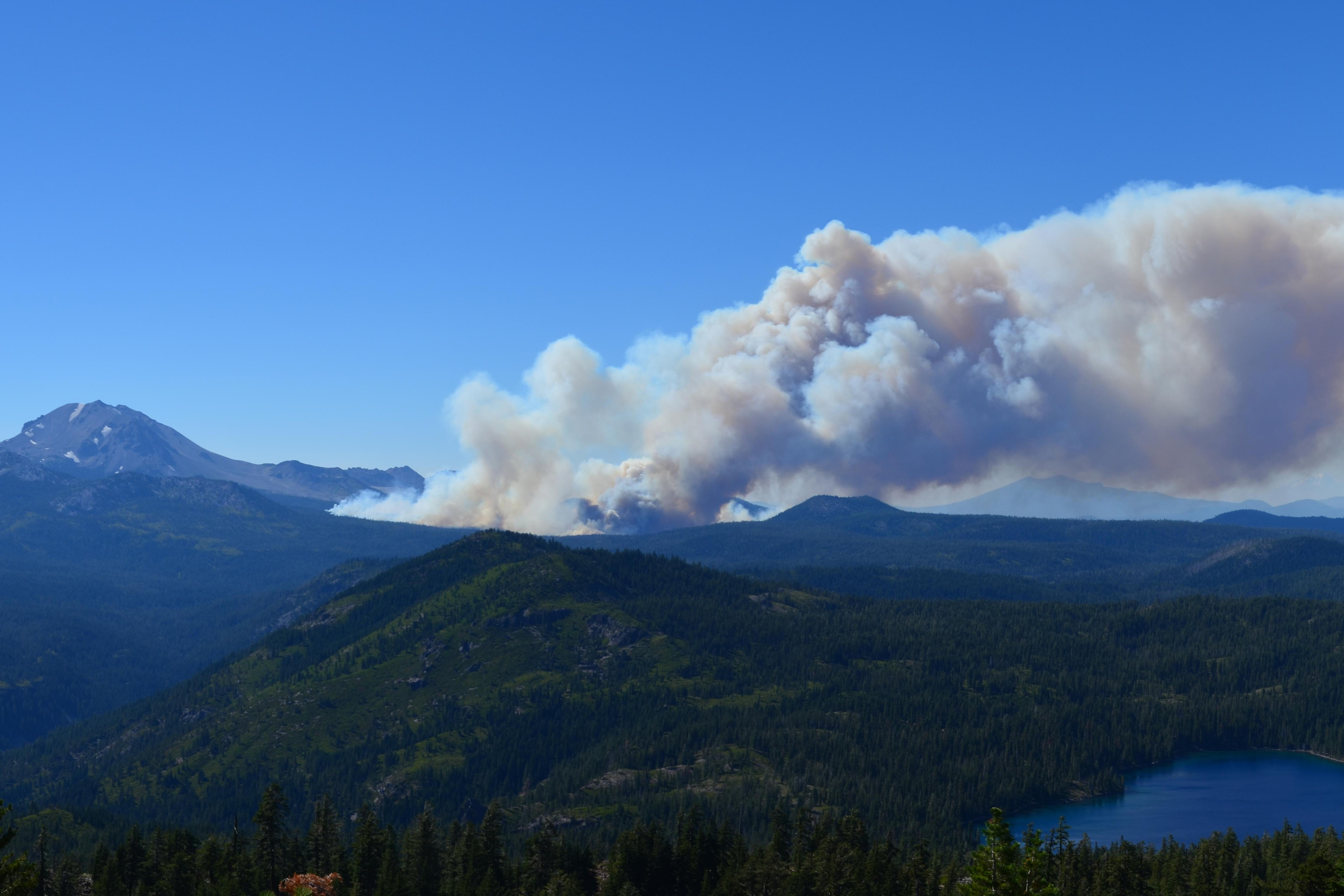
- The Reading Fire seen on August 7, 2012 from Mount Harkness, with Lassen Peak to the left
- Date: July 23 –; August 22, 2012; (31 days)
- Location: Shasta County, Northern California, United States
- Coordinates: 40.495°N 121.454°W

Statistics
- Burned area: 28,079 acres (11,363 ha; 44 sq mi; 114 km^{2})

Impacts
- Injuries: 2
- Cost: $17 million; (equivalent to about $23 million in 2024)

Ignition
- Cause: Lightning

Map
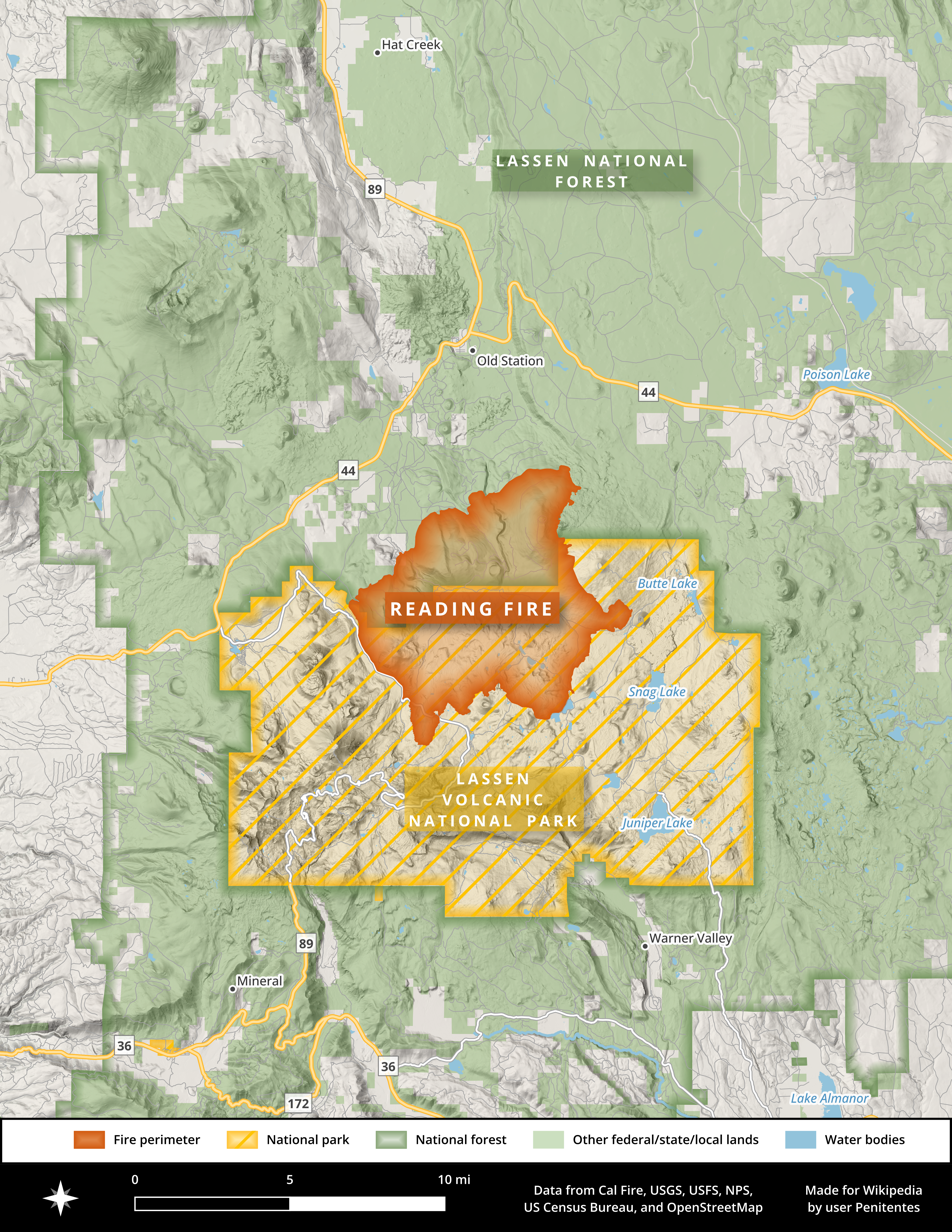
- The footprint of the fire in Lassen Volcanic National Park and the Lassen National Forest

- The general location of the fire in Shasta County, Northern California

The 2012 Reading Fire was a large wildfire in Lassen Volcanic National Park and the Lassen National Forest in Northern California. Ignited by a lightning strike on July 23, the fire was managed for ecological benefits by park officials until shifts in the weather caused the fire to jump its intended control lines. The Reading Fire ultimately burned 28,079 acres (11,363 hectares), partially outside the park, before it was fully contained on August 22, 2012. The fire destroyed no buildings and caused no fatalities or even serious injuries. The fire's unintended escape led members of the public and several California politicians to criticize park officials for allowing the fire to go unsuppressed after its discovery.

== Background ==
Burn scars in tree rings suggest that wildfires historically burned in the area that is now Lassen Volcanic National Park with a return interval of between five and 15 years, and with mixed severities. This baseline changed dramatically beginning in 1905, when fire suppression efforts began in earnest. The new fire regime lasted until park policy changed in the 1980s, and Lassen Volcanic National Park began managing lightning-ignited fires for their ecological benefits within the Lassen Volcanic Wilderness. Wildfires in the park have a "strong tendency" to burn from southwest to northeast.

A scant winter snowpack leading up to the 2012 fire season in Northern California drove the moisture levels in all dead fuels (including large fuels that take longer to dry out, such as dead fallen trees and brush piles) to record low levels. The low fuel moistures contributed to 'spotting' fire behavior on the Reading Fire, where wind-blown firebrands or embers start new fires where they land.

== Progression ==
On July 23, 2012, thunderstorms developed over Lassen Volcanic National Park. Lightning struck a single red fir tree on a north-facing slope, at about 7,100 ft (2,200 metres) in elevation, at approximately 5:09 p.m. PDT. This ignition point was located in a designated wilderness area, approximately one mile (1.6 kilometres) northeast of Paradise Meadows and 2.5 miles (4.0 km) east of Lassen Peak, south of the Lassen National Park Highway. The fire was named for nearby Reading Peak.

A National Park Service fire management officer and a member of the Forest Service hiked in to the fire, directed by a reconnaissance aircraft. At that point, late in the day, the fire had hardly expanded beyond the lone red fir tree and its behavior was subdued—a later report described the fire at this point as three feet (0.91 m) by five feet (1.5 m) and "smoldering". After evaluating local topographical features and other conditions (such as a dearth of dense vegetation, a cooler northern slope, ridges and roads at which to limit fire spread, etc.), the personnel at the scene concluded the area might be conducive to a managed wildfire and deferred a decision on whether to extinguish the fire or not to the following day.

On July 24, park personnel conversed among themselves and with experts (including the National Park Service’s regional fire ecologist) before receiving permission from the Lassen Volcanic National Park superintendent to manage the fire. The initial goal was to confine the fire to an area of just 700 acres (280 hectares), bounded by two drainages and by Lassen National Park Highway to the north. The Reading Fire was initially managed by a Type 4 incident management team and approximately 16 firefighters. By July 30, one week after igniting, the fire had grown to three acres (1.2 hectares). During that week the fire behaved as predicted, slowly spreading downhill while only consuming surface fuels/vegetation.

As the calendar turned to August, the fire began to expand at a greater pace. By the 3rd of the month, it had burned 50 acres (20 ha), and by the following day, 94 acres (38 ha). On August 6, as management of the fire was being handed over to a Type 3 incident management team, the Reading Fire spotted (jumped, via windblown embers) across the park highway where personnel had intended to hold the fire. The fire took root in the Hat Creek drainage and continued to expand, reaching 1,010 acres (410 ha) by the end of the day.

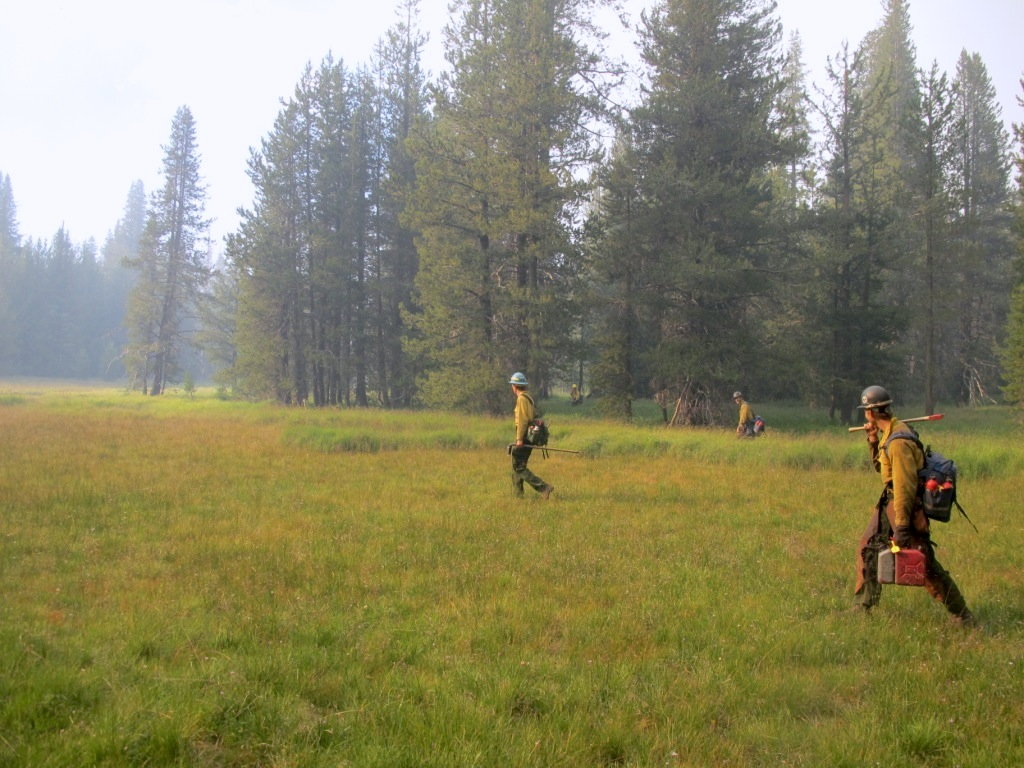
Firefighters scout for spot fires in a meadow on August 5, 2012

On August 7, continued southerly winds pushed the fire north and out of the park itself, and the Reading Fire established itself on Badger Mountain in the Lassen National Forest. Air tankers attacked the resulting spot fires. Fire growth continued to accelerate: on the 8th the fire had burned 2,000 acres (810 ha), by the 10th more than 9,000 acres (3,600 ha), and by August 12, the fire had burned more than 15,000 acres (6,100 ha). On August 13, a Type 1 incident management team took control of the suppression effort and began to perform firing operations to contain the fire indirectly. Meanwhile, a spot fire was detected just four miles (6.4 km) south of Old Station.

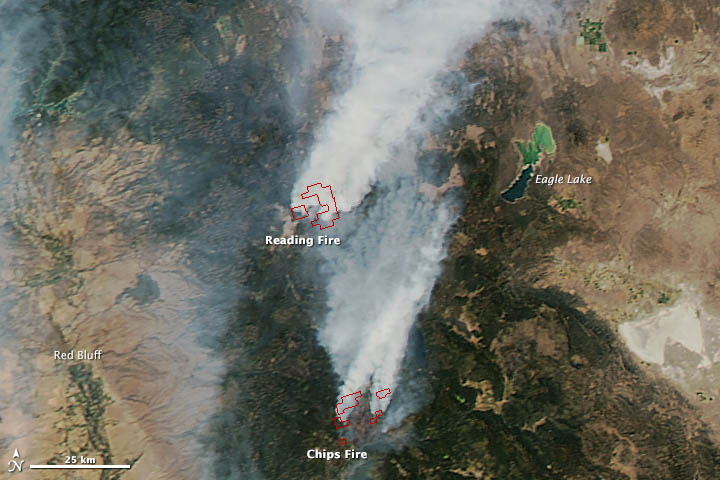
The Reading Fire (top) and Chips Fire (bottom) are shown in this MODIS satellite view on August 13, 2012

Firefighters began conducting burning operations "day and night" to halt the fire's spread. On August 17th the fire's growth was "minimal" and confined to its eastern and southern flanks, remaining four miles (6.4 km) from Old Station. Aircraft continued to drop fire retardant on the eastern edge, aiding ground crews constructing fire lines near Twin Lakes. Firefighters held the containment lines on Prospect Peak. By August 18, aided by good weather and water-dropping helicopters, the containment lines on the fire's north and west sides were completed and the fire's overall containment rose to 32 percent. The remaining areas of active fire on the east and southeast sides of the fire were addressed by firefighters constructing containment lines by hand in designated wilderness areas, helped by less dense fuels—the effects of other wildfires in the two decades prior.

The fire was declared fully contained on August 22. The firefighting effort involved more than 1,200 personnel at its peak, at a total cost of $17 million (equivalent to about $23 million in 2024). The fire was declared controlled on October 23, 2012. The total burned area was 28,079 acres (11,363 ha). This footprint comprised 16,993 acres (6,877 ha) burned in Lassen Volcanic National Park, 11,071 acres (4,480 ha) burned in the Hat Creek Ranger District of the Lassen National Forest, and 75 acres (30 ha) of private land. Of the 7,041 fires during California's 2012 wildfire season, which burned a total of 829,224 acres (335,575 ha), the Reading Fire was the seventh largest.

== Effects ==
There were no fatalities or serious injuries associated with the Reading Fire. According to the National Park Service review of the fire, only two minor firefighter injuries occurred.

The Reading Fire caused the closure of the Lassen Park Highway for 20 days, as well as the closure of about 30 miles (48 km) of trails in and near the park. The Pacific Crest Trail closed to hikers between Lower Twin Lake to the south and Old Station to the north (outside the Lassen National Forest). The park itself did not close to visitors.

No structures were lost in the Reading Fire. The fire burned through multiple trails in Lassen Volcanic National Park, including the Twin Lakes Loop Trail, the Nobles Emigrant Trail, and parts of the Pacific Crest Trail.

=== Environmental impacts ===
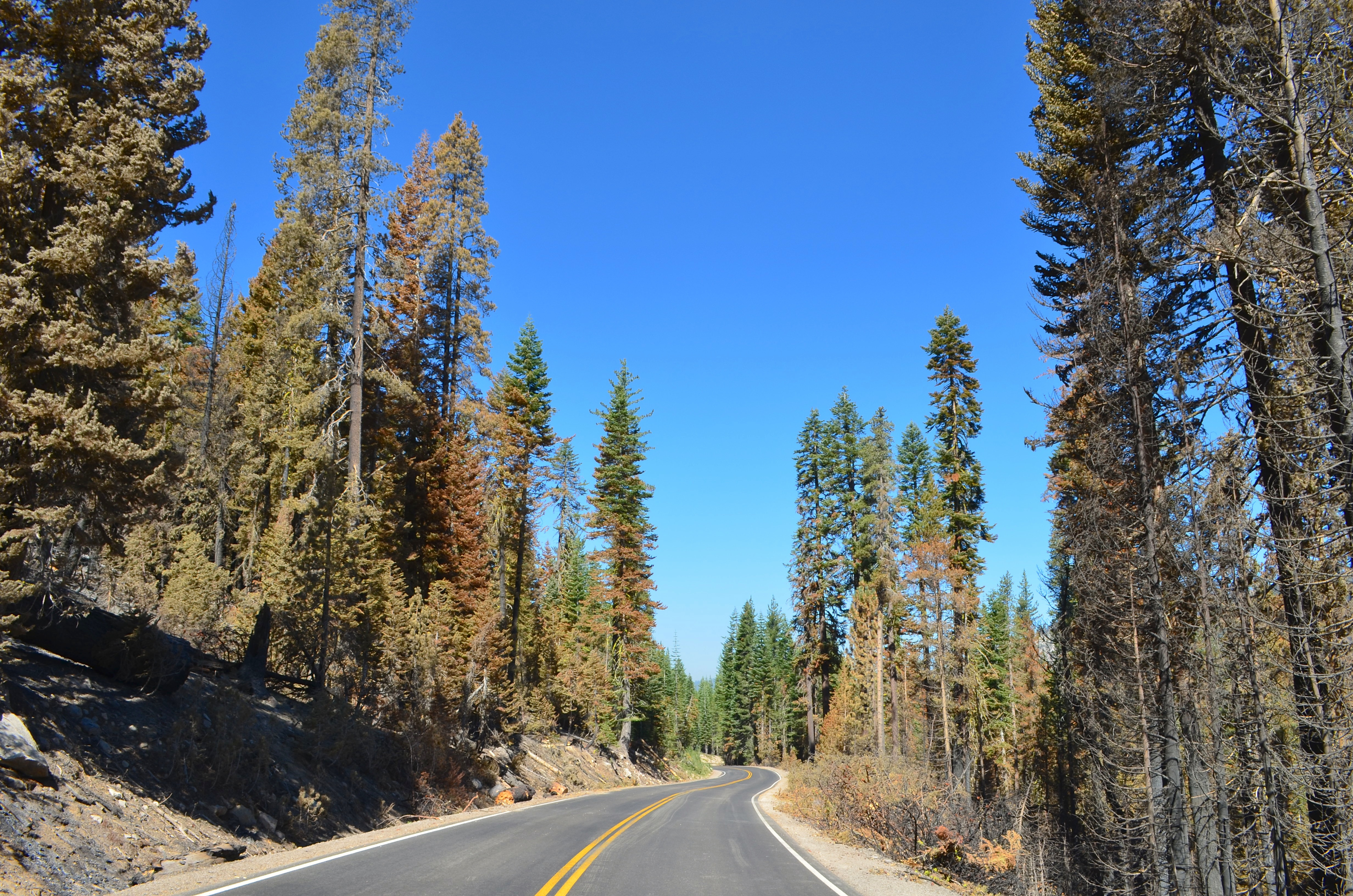
The effects of the Reading Fire from the main park road, north of Summit Lake, on August 22, 2012

Of the roughly 11,000 acres (4,500 ha) that the fire burned in the Lassen National Forest, 65 percent experienced a moderate-to-high soil burn severity. The other 35 percent experienced low to very low soil burn severity. For the roughly 17,000 acres (6,900 ha) that the Reading Fire burned in Lassen Volcanic National Park, 49 percent experienced a moderate-to-high soil burn severity and 51 percent low to unburned soil burn severity.

A preliminary report found that 30 percent of the fire's footprint recorded a moderate vegetation burn severity, and 35 percent recorded a high vegetation burn severity. Park staff reported that "pretty good regeneration" had already begun in the predicted areas by June of 2013.

=== Political response ===
Following a request by members of the Shasta County board of supervisors, U.S. Congressional representatives Wally Herger (CA-02) and Tom McClintock (CA-04) called an informal hearing at the California State Capitol in Sacramento on October 24, 2012, inviting testimony from the Park Service, the Forest Service, and the California Department of Forestry and Fire Protection (Cal Fire). Both representatives heavily criticized the Park Service for their decision to manage the fire. The director of fire and aviation management for the Pacific Southwest Region of the Forest Service and the deputy director of Cal Fire both said they would have extinguished the fire immediately had it ignited in their areas of responsibility. Shasta County residents also spoke at the hearing, largely to air their view that the Reading Fire had negatively impacted tourism income.

The following summer, Lassen Volcanic National Park officials announced they would not manage natural lightning fires or set any prescribed fires in the park for the season, citing drought conditions and "lessons learned from the previous year’s Reading Fire".

== Growth and containment ==
Fire containment status Gray: contained; Red: active; %: percent contained
Date	Total area burned	Personnel	Containment
Jul 23	<1 acre (<1 ha)	...	...
Jul 24	<1 acre (<1 ha)	...	...
Jul 25	<1 acre (<1 ha)	...	...
Jul 26	<1 acre (<1 ha)	...	...
Jul 27	<1 acre (<1 ha)	...	...
Jul 28	<1 acre (<1 ha)	...	...
Jul 29	<1 acre (<1 ha)	...	...
Jul 30	3.3 acres (1 ha)	...	...
Jul 31	5.1 acres (2 ha)	...	...
Aug 1	24 acres (10 ha)	...	...
Aug 2	44 acres (18 ha)	...	...
Aug 3	50 acres (20 ha)	...	...
Aug 4	94 acres (38 ha)	...	...
Aug 5	140 acres (57 ha)	...	...
Aug 6	1,010 acres (409 ha)	...	...
Aug 7	1,400 acres (567 ha)	300 personnel	
Aug 8	2,000 acres (809 ha)	331 personnel	
Aug 9	3,700 acres (1,497 ha)	492 personnel	
Aug 10	9,063 acres (3,668 ha)	...	
Aug 11	...	...	...
Aug 12	15,491 acres (6,269 ha)	...	...
Aug 13	>20,600 acres (8,337 ha)	1,218 personnel	
Aug 14	23,958 acres (9,695 ha)	...	
Aug 15	23,958 acres (9,695 ha)	1,191 personnel	
Aug 16	25,242 acres (10,215 ha)	1,083 personnel	
Aug 17	27,777 acres (11,241 ha)	994 personnel	
Aug 18	27,777 acres (11,241 ha)	933 personnel	
Aug 19	...	...	...
Aug 20	...	...	...
Aug 21	27,887 acres (11,285 ha)	...	
Aug 22	28,079 acres (11,363 ha)	...	

== See also ==
- Glossary of wildfire terms
- List of California wildfires
- 2012 California wildfires
- Cerro Grande Fire
- Dixie Fire
- Calf Canyon/Hermits Peak Fire
