= Haines Index =

Estimation of the risk of wildfire

Haines Index (also known as the Lower Atmosphere Severity Index) is a weather index developed by meteorologist Donald Haines in 1988 that measures the potential for dry, unstable air to contribute to the development of large or erratic wildland fires. The index is derived from the stability (temperature difference between different levels of the atmosphere) and moisture content (dew point depression) of the lower atmosphere. These data may be acquired with a radiosonde or simulated by a numerical weather prediction model. The index is calculated over three ranges of atmospheric pressure: low elevation (950-850 millibars (mb)), mid elevation (850-700 mb), and high elevation (700-500 mb).

A Haines Index of 6 means a high potential for an existing fire to become large or exhibit erratic fire behavior, 5 means medium potential, 4 means low potential, and anything less than 4 means very low potential.

The US National Weather Service discontinued use of the Haines Index along with Lightning Activity Level in its Fire Weather Forecasts in December 2024, citing new science that suggested these measures were not as effective as others in forecasting, according to Service Change Notice 24-107.

== See also ==
- Australian Fire Danger Rating System
- Forest fire weather index (Canada)
- Wildfire modeling
