= Rush Fire =

2012 wildfire in California and Nevada

- Part of the 2012 California wildfires
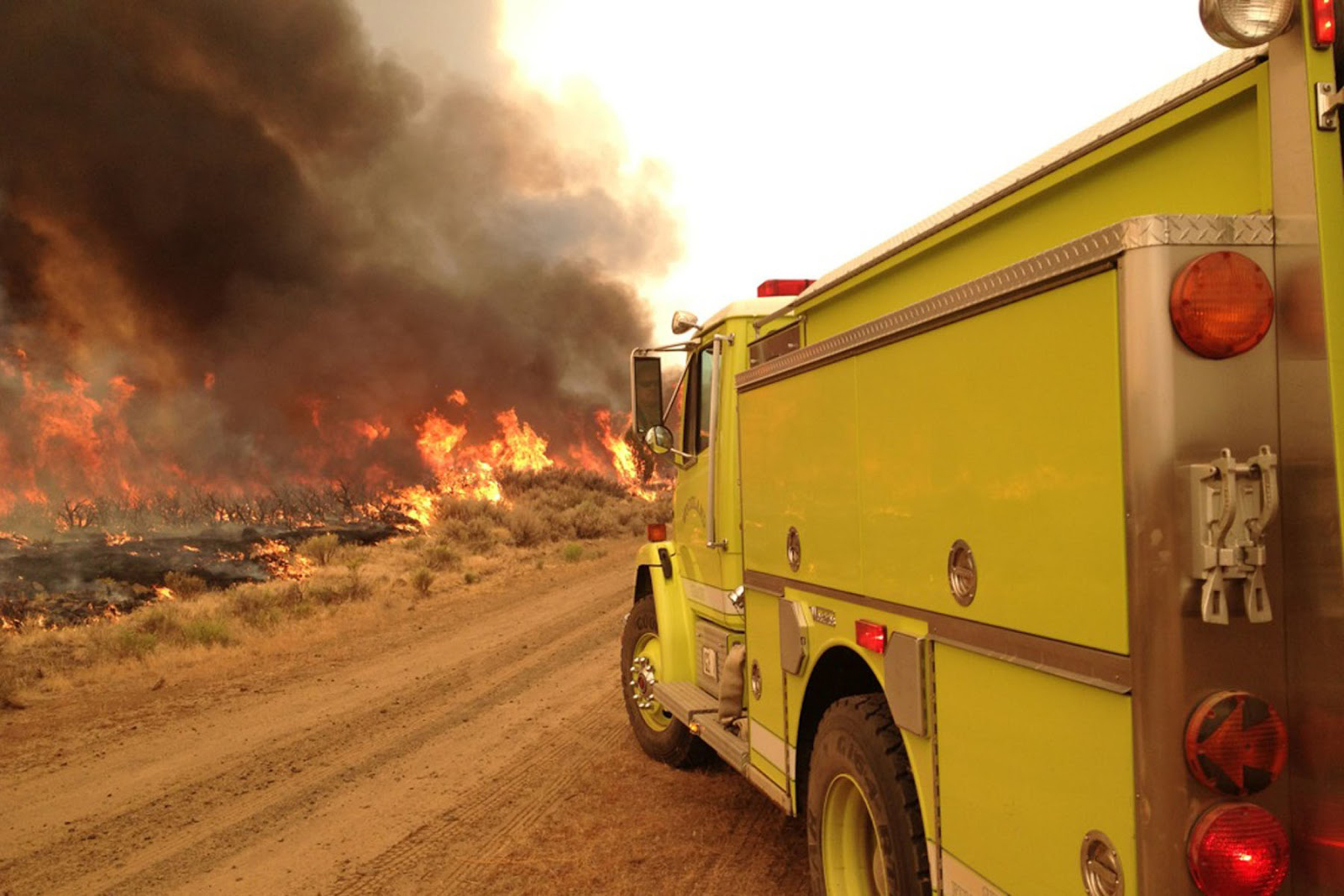
- Rush Fire, in Lassen County, California
- Date: August 12, 2012 –; August 30, 2012
- Location: Lassen County, California; Washoe County, Nevada
- Coordinates: 40°37′16″N 120°09′07″W

Statistics
- Burned area: 315,577 acres (1,280 km^{2}): 271,911 acres (1,100 km^{2}) in CA; 43,686 acres (177 km^{2}) in NV

Impacts
- Structures lost: 1

Ignition
- Cause: Lightning

The Rush Fire was the largest wildfire of the 2012 California wildfire season. The fire, which started in Lassen County, California, eventually spread into Washoe County, Nevada. The fire consumed a total of 315,577 acres (490 mi^{2}; 1,280 km^{2}) of sagebrush, of which 271,991 acres (1,100 km^{2}; 420 mi^{2}) were in California. At the time, the burn area in California made the Rush Fire the second-largest wildfire in California since 1932 (when accurate area estimates became available). In December 2017, the Thomas Fire surpassed the Rush Fire to become the second-largest wildfire in modern California history, in terms of the area burned in California. In mid-August 2018, the Ranch Fire in the Mendocino Complex Fire surpassed the total acreage of the Rush Fire in both California and Nevada.

The fire destroyed important habitat for the greater sage-grouse, as well as a single barn. On August 30, 2012, the Rush Fire was 100% contained.

== See also ==
- List of California wildfires
