= Wilson Canyon Park =

Park in Los Angeles, California, United States

Coordinates: 34°19′58″N 118°26′31″W

- Interactive map of Wilson Canyon Park
- Type: Urban park-Regional park-Nature reserve
- Location: 14450 Olive View Drive; Sylmar, California 91342
- Area: 240 acres (97 ha)
- Opening: 1996
- Operator: Mountains Recreation and Conservation Authority
- Status: Open
- Hiking trails: Los Pinetos Equestrian Trail, Wilson Canyon Trail, Wilson Canyon Loop Trail
- Parking: Paid parking area
- Website: https://mrca.ca.gov/parks/park-listing/wilson-canyon-park/

Wilson Canyon Park is a public park located in the western San Gabriel Mountains, in the neighborhood of Sylmar in the northeastern San Fernando Valley in the northern portion of the City of Los Angeles, California.

== History ==
In early 1871, Christopher North Wilson of Ohio and his family arrived in California from their hometown of Meadville, Pennsylvania. They established a ranch near what became known as Wilson Canyon, becoming one of the early Anglo-American settlers of the San Fernando Valley. Christopher N. Wilson was survived solely by his son John Thomas Wilson, who remained in the San Fernando Valley and would set up his residence in the city of San Fernando. In 1888, John T. Wilson married María Expectación Graciosa "Grace" López, the daughter of prominent local Californios Gerónimo and Catalina López, who were descendants of one of the original Spanish settler families of Alta California and were active in the San Fernando Valley from the secularization of the San Fernando Mission through the early years of Californian U.S. statehood. In 1920, a portion of the Wilson Ranch was ceded for the establishment of the Olive View Sanatorium. John T. Wilson died at the age of 90 in April 1947.

In the following years, especially in the 1960's, the community of Sylmar to the south of the ranch would go from being primarily rural, mostly olive plantations, to slowly becoming more suburbanized. The area that now encompasses the park would go mostly undeveloped except for the work of flood control works. Finally, the Santa Monica Mountains Conservancy, a member of the Mountains Recreation and Conservation Authority, purchased 240 acres (97 ha) of land in Wilson Canyon and opened Wilson Canyon Park in 1996.

== Description ==
Wilson Canyon Park is located in the foothills of the western San Gabriel Mountains and covers an area of 240 acres (97 ha), making it one of the larger parks of the City of Los Angeles. It has a relatively secluded wilderness and networks of easy to moderate trails. It is popular with hikers, equestrians, mountain bikers, bird watchers and picnickers. The park is a popular portal to the adjacent Angeles National Forest and the recently expanded San Gabriel Mountains National Monument to the north.

=== Access ===
The entrance to the park is located to the east of Olive View Medical Center on Olive View Drive, from here the park road takes visitors 0.6 miles (0.97 km) to the main trailheads and parking areas. The park provides parking near the main trailheads for a $5 fee, but it is also possible for visitors to park on Olive View Drive and walk up the park road to the main park area. The park has easy access from the Foothill Freeway.

Los Angeles Metro Local bus lines 224 and 690 have stops in the Olive View Medical Center which are in close proximity to the park.

== See also ==
- San Gabriel Mountains
- California chaparral and woodlands – Ecoregion
- California oak woodland – plant community
- O'Melveny Park
