= Sylmar Fire =

Sylmar Fire could refer to either of two wildfires in the Sylmar neighborhood of Los Angeles, California:

- Sayre Fire, a wildfire that happened in November 2008
- Hurst Fire, a wildfire that happened in January 2025
