= Saddleridge Fire =

2019 wildfire in Southern California

- Part of the 2019 California wildfires
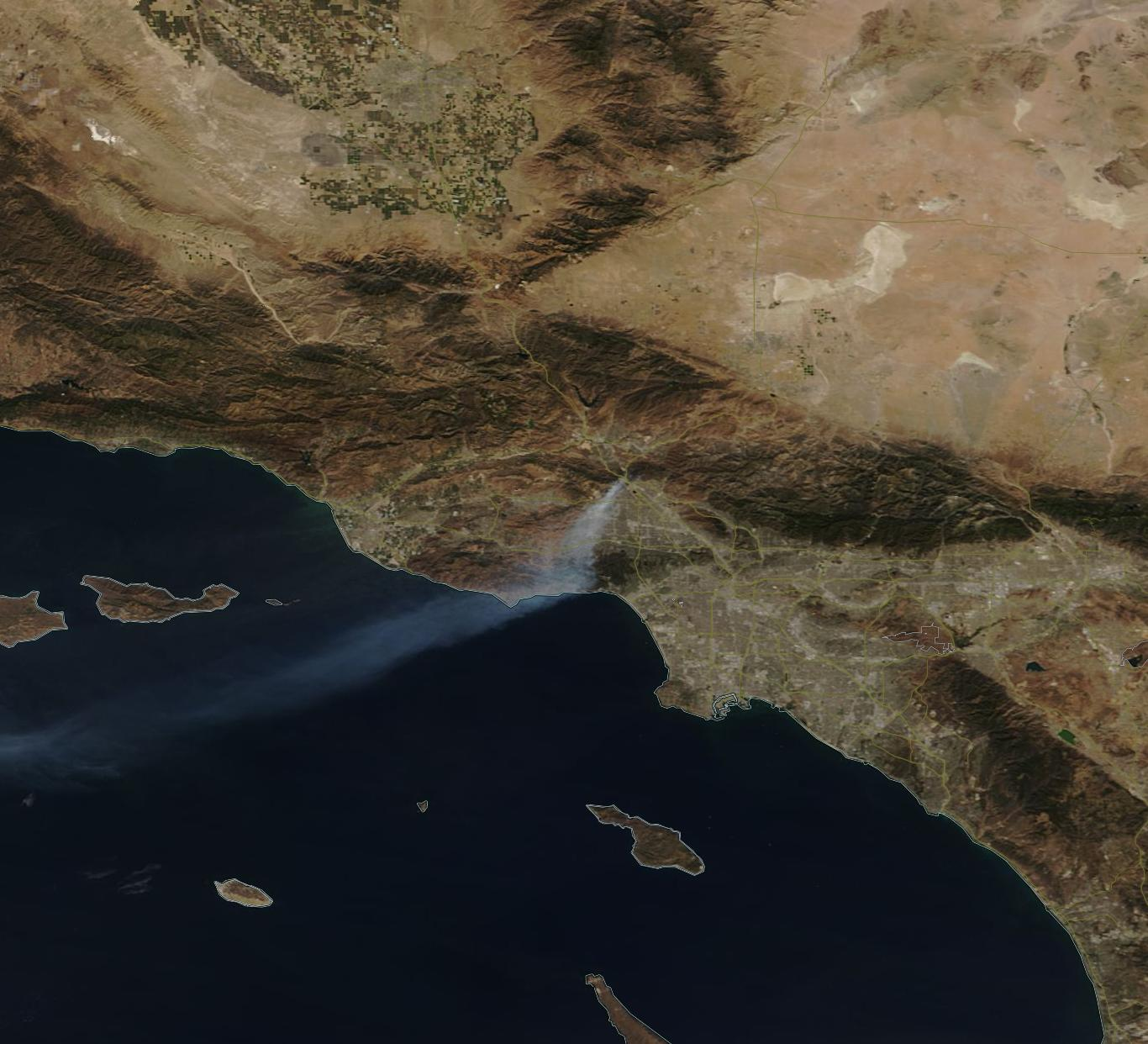
- Date: October 10, 2019 –; October 31, 2019
- Location: Sylmar, Los Angeles County, California, United States
- Coordinates: 34.326°N 118.481°W

Statistics
- Burned area: 8,799 acres (3,561 ha)

Impacts
- Deaths: 1
- Injuries: 8
- Structures destroyed: 25

Ignition
- Cause: Powerline

Map
- Location within southern California

Location of Saddleridge Fire

The Saddleridge Fire was a wildfire burning near the San Fernando Valley of Los Angeles County, California. It broke out roughly around 9:02 pm on Thursday October 10, 2019. It is still undetermined as to how it had started, but believed that the blaze had started beneath a high voltage transmission tower. Reporters and first responders began to assess the fire, the main location at the time of ignition was at the entrance of Interstate 210 and Yarnell Street. Residents were being evacuated, shop owners standing by in hopes their shops were still up, and many of the community helping with evacuating all animals from surrounding farms and ranches. The fire was fully extinguished on Thursday October 31, 2019, twenty days after first igniting. The fire burned 8,799 acres (3,561 ha) and resulted in 8 injuries and 1 fatality.

== Progression ==
The Saddleridge fire broke out late in the evening hours of Thursday, October 10, at around 9:03 pm during a highly anticipated Santa Ana wind event scheduled to commence throughout that day. Igniting in Sylmar, off Interstate 210 and Yarnell Street, the blaze immediately began pushing predominantly west as it burned in all directions. Burning in a mixture of wild land and urban interface, firefighters were tasked initially with structure protection as the fire loomed to 200 acres (80 ha) within its first hour. By early Friday morning, the high winds had blown embers half a mile (800 m) west of the main fireline, jumping Interstate 5, and triggered spot fires in the foothills above Porter Ranch where the fire continued to burn. During these initial hours, many likened the fire's footprint to that of the destructive Sayre and Sesnon fires in 2008. By that time, the fire was threatening thousands of structures throughout the Sylmar, Porter Ranch and Granada Hills communities as well as forcing the closure of both Interstate 210 and Interstate 5. Mandatory evacuations were put in place for the Oakridge Estates, which had previous been destroyed in the Sayre fire, as the conflagration ballooned to 1,600 acres (650 ha) by 3 am.

By sunrise on Friday, October 11, the fire was reportedly well over 4,500 acres (1,800 ha) with an estimated 25 structures either damaged or destroyed. The fire had also reportedly lead to the death of a man in his late 50s when he went into cardiac arrest amid the fire. One firefighter was hospitalized with a minor eye injury while over 1,000 personnel were on scene battling the blaze by this point. Due to the Saddleridge fire's dramatic push towards the several highly populated communities within the San Fernando Valley, up to 23,000 homes were placed under mandatory evacuation, leaving over 100,000 residents displaced at the fire's peak.

The Los Angeles Fire Department has determined that the fire began under a 50 ft × 70 ft (15 m × 21 m) area under a high voltage transmission line, but they had not determined the cause as of October 28. 98% of the fire is contained.

On October 18 at 7:00 a.m., the Los Angeles Fire Department released information regarding the fire and the efforts to contain it. The size of the fire had grown to a sizeable 8,391 acres (3,396 ha) with 19 structures being destroyed and another 88 being damaged. Injuries included a man dying from cardiac arrest at a hospital, he was a resident of the area claimed by the fire. Out of the 1,047 personnel that was assigned to contain the fire, eight firefighters suffered non-life-threatening injuries while battling the flames. The containment has reached 97% according to the data provided by the Los Angeles Fire Department.

== See also ==
2008 Sayre Fire

2025 Hurst Fire, fire that burned in roughly the same footprint.
