= Concordia Schools =

Concordia Schools can refer to:

- Concordia Parish School Board - A public school district in Louisiana
- The Concordia Schools - A private school system in Los Angeles
