= Sayre Fire =

2008 wildfire in Southern California

Coordinates: 34°20′N 118°28′W

- Part of the 2008 California wildfires
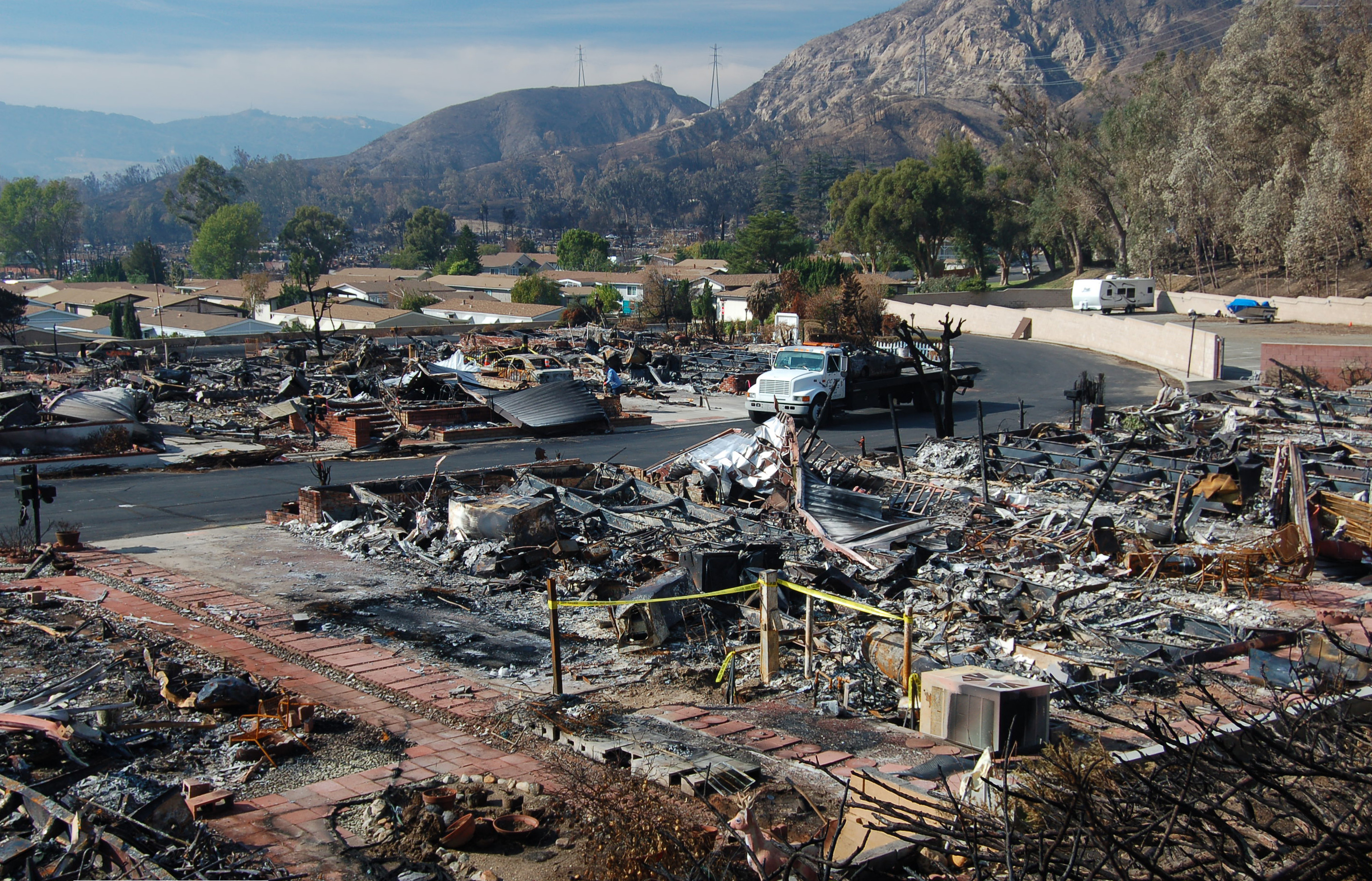
- The remains of the Oakridge mobile home park in Sylmar; 480 of the park's 600 mobile homes were burned in the fire. The undamaged houses in the background became uninhabitable due to the lack of utility service.
- Date: November 14, 2008 –; November 20, 2008
- Location: Sylmar, Los Angeles, California, United States

Statistics
- Burned area: 11,200 acres (45 km^{2})

Impacts
- Deaths: 0
- Injuries: 5 firefighters, 1 civilian

The Sayre Fire, also known as the Sylmar Fire, was a November 2008 wildfire which burned 489 residences in Los Angeles, considered to be the "worst loss of homes due to fire" in the city's history at that time. The fire was first reported at 10:29 p.m. PDT on November 14, 2008, in the Sylmar section of Los Angeles. As of November 20, 2008, the fire was 100% contained, had burned 11,262 acres (46 km^{2}) and destroyed more than 600 structures (480 mobile homes, nine single-family homes, 104 outbuildings and 10 commercial buildings). The number of homes lost in the Sayre fire exceeded the prior record set in 1961 by the Bel Air Fire which claimed 484 homes, and it remained the most destructive in Los Angeles history until it too was surpassed by the Palisades Fire in 2025. There were no fatalities, just minor injuries to five firefighters and one civilian.

== Origins and cause ==
One day after the wind-swept "Tea Fire" destroyed more than 200 homes in Montecito and Santa Barbara, the Sayre Fire was reported in the 13000 block of Sayre Street in Sylmar, just north of the Foothill Freeway (Route 210) near Veterans Memorial County Park. It spread rapidly, fanned by strong Santa Ana winds with near hurricane-force gusts estimated at between 50 mph (80 km/h) and 80 mph (130 km/h). California Governor Arnold Schwarzenegger called the causative factors a "perfect storm"—strong winds, low humidity, high temperatures, and dry brush.

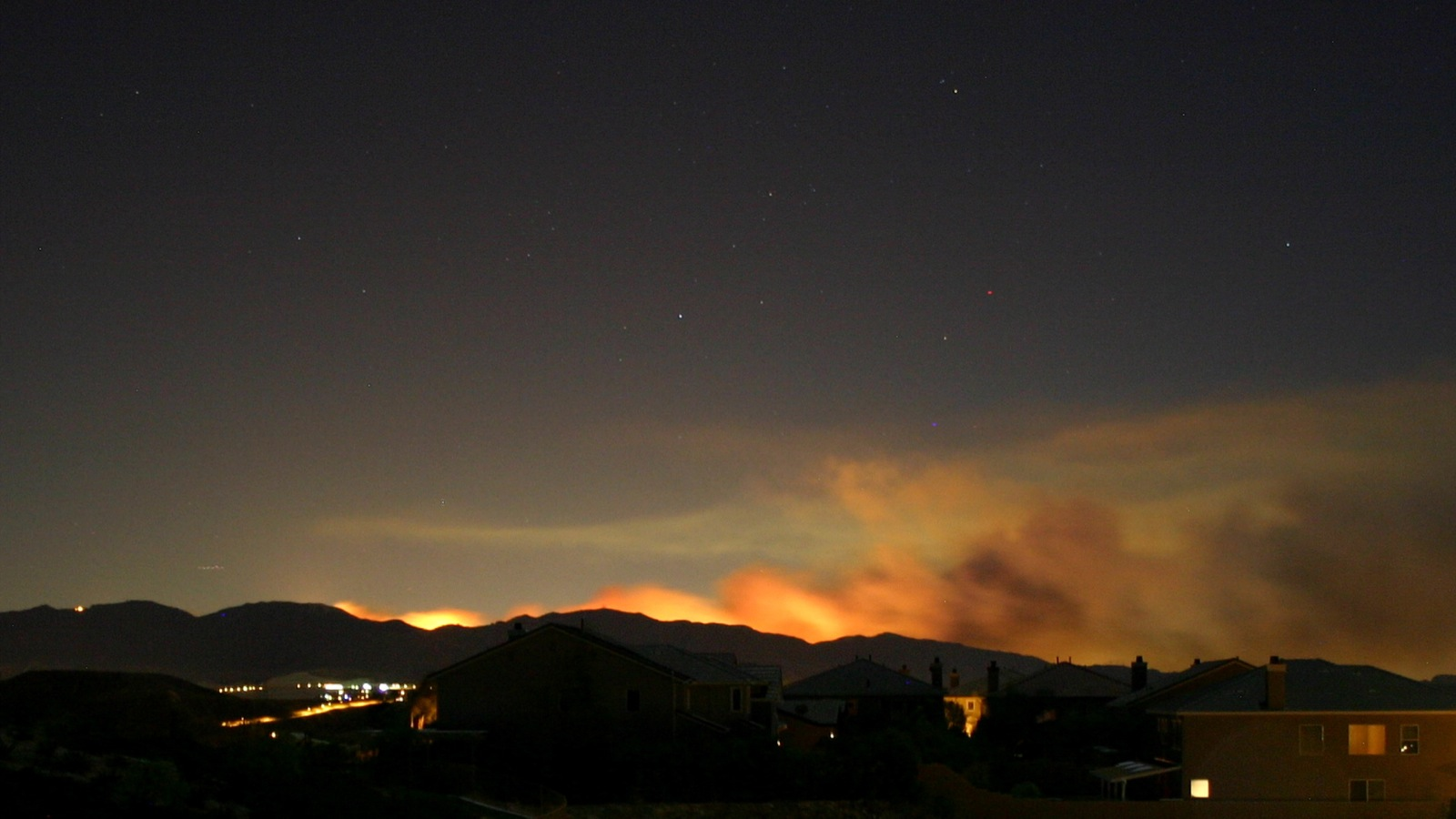
The Sayre fire as seen from Santa Clarita on November 15, 2008

== Response ==
In the pre-dawn hours on November 15, 2008, over 600 firefighters battled the Sayre Fire, the number on site increasing to 1,100 by midday. Fire officials said winds of “near hurricane force” grounded some of their water-dropping aircraft. The fire moved west from Sylmar and threatened the luxury planned community of Knollwood in Granada Hills. On November 15, 2008, at 8:00 a.m. PDT, Mayor Antonio Villaraigosa declared a state of emergency in the city, and Governor Schwarzenegger issued a state of emergency declaration later in the morning. On November 18, 2008, President George W. Bush declared the area struck by November 2008 California wildfires a federal disaster area, freeing up federal aid for reconstruction efforts.

== Impact of the fire ==
=== Housing loss ===
County fire officials reported on November 19, 2008 that the Sayre Fire had destroyed more than 600 structures, including 480 mobile homes, nine single-family homes, 104 outbuildings and 10 commercial buildings. The Los Angeles Times called it "the worst loss of homes due to fire in the city of Los Angeles" and reported that it "appeared to be the largest number of housing units lost to fire in the city of Los Angeles, surpassing the 484 residences destroyed in the 1961 Bel Air fire". Los Angeles County Supervisor Zev Yaroslavsky, a lifelong city resident, noted: "This is as bad a fire as I can remember since the Bel-Air Fire. The human devastation that's involved, whether you live in a mobile home or an estate, it's devastating. We can't even begin to weigh their loss."

In the pre-dawn hours on November 15, 2008, the fire devastated the Oakridge Mobile Home Park, destroying 480 of the park's 600 mobile homes. Los Angeles Fire Department Captain Steve Ruda described the scene as "an absolute firestorm" with 50-foot (15 m) high flames and added, "Hoses were melting into the cement and concrete. That's how hot the fire was." Firefighters rescued several individuals from their mobile homes, and four civilians rescued a 300-pound disabled woman, who was trapped in her mobile home, as fire was breaking the glass. Though Los Angeles Police Chief William Bratton initially expressed concern that some elderly residents might have perished at the mobile home park, cadaver-sniffing dogs searched the ruins and found no evidence of any fatalities.

The San Fernando Valley based Daily News described the Oakridge park, parts of which were also burned after the 1994 Northridge earthquake, as follows:

"With 600 households, well-manicured lawns and luxury amenities, Oakridge Mobile Home Park was no trailer park. The gated community, most of which was reduced to ash by a roaring wildfire that swept through the Sylmar hills late Friday and early Saturday, featured a putting green, an Olympic-size swimming pool and tennis courts. 'It wasn't just a mobile home (park),' said Linda Pogacnik, 63, whose home was destroyed. 'It was the Beverly Hills of mobile homes.'

After the effort in Oakridge, a firefighter produced a burned U.S. flag on a broken stick taken from a home that was destroyed in Oakridge. The firefighter offered it as a sign of hope and bravery for firefighters. The flag was presented by Los Angeles Fire Department Acting Fire Chief Emile Mack to Oakridge Mobile Home Park manager Jinny Harmon. It was later framed and hung in the new clubhouse at Oakridge.

In a press briefing on November 16, 2008, Governor Schwarzenegger noted that the homes in the Oakridge community had ignited "like matches", and called for a review of fire retardancy standards applicable to mobile homes and mobile home parks.

=== Public response ===
In the early morning hours of November 15, 2008, officials ordered the mandatory evacuation of residents north of the 210 Freeway in the Sylmar area. The evacuation area was expanded to cover more than 10,000 people, living in the far north end of the San Fernando Valley from Sylmar in the east to Granada Hills in the west. Evacuation centers and shelters were established at Sylmar High School, San Fernando High School, Chatsworth High School and Kennedy High School. By the afternoon of November 16, 2008, all of the evacuation centers except for Sylmar High School had been closed. Large animal evacuation centers were established at Pierce College and at the Hansen Dam Equestrian Center.

The fire resulted in temporary closures of several of the San Fernando Valley's major freeways, including the Golden State Freeway (Interstate 5) at the Newhall Pass, the Foothill Freeway (Interstate 210) from I-5 through Sylmar, the Simi Valley-San Fernando Valley Freeway (California State Route 118), the San Diego Freeway (Interstate 405) at Route 118 and the Antelope Valley Freeway (California State Route 14) from south Santa Clarita to the Newhall Pass. By late afternoon on November 15, 2008, the California Highway Patrol announced the re-opening of the freeways closed due to the Sayre fire.

Shortly after 1:00 a.m. PDT on November 15, 2008, flames from the Sayre Fire threatened Olive View-UCLA Medical Center in Sylmar. The Los Angeles Times reported that, around midnight, "tall walls of flames quickly surrounded Olive View Medical Center," as "embers blew down streets, catching trees and shrubs on fire around the hospital," and "before long, the hospital was surrounded on all sides by fire." Some 200 patients were sheltered in place as firefighters fought the flames outside the hospital. The hospital lost power, generators failed to work, and the smell of smoke filled darkened hallways, as staff tended to patients with flashlights, and critical patients were kept alive with hand-powered ventilators. A number of infants and critical patients were evacuated in ambulances. More than 40 buildings on the Olive View campus were damaged in the fire, and the child care center was destroyed.

On November 15, 2008, the Los Angeles Police Department arrested five individuals for looting in areas evacuated due to the fire, and imposed a curfew for young people. A homeowner in Porter Ranch found two women taking property from his home, "stacking his property outside the house and carrying them to a green four-door Infiniti." The two women, one from North Hollywood and the other from Sherman Oaks, were arrested, and police believe the women may have burglarized other homes in the area.

=== Other impacts ===
Ash from the Sayre Fire also resulted in the death of Los Angeles County's mosquito-killing fish, which were bred in ponds located in Sylmar. The fish, Gambusia affinis, eat mosquito larvae and are distributed throughout the county from the Sylmar ponds as part of an effort to battle the spread of the West Nile virus. The Sylmar ponds where the mosquito fish are bred were inundated with ash, resulting in the fish deaths. Despite the fire raging several miles to the north, a San Fernando Valley shopping center, Americana at Brand, decided to move ahead with an evening fireworks display as part of its Christmas tree lighting ceremony. The Los Angeles Times reported that the fireworks sent area residents "running outside in alarm. One resident was quoted in the Times as saying that, with the local hotels filled with evacuees, "It was a really an inappropriate display. This was not the time to shoot off fireworks." A mall spokesperson said the fireworks could not be rescheduled and added, "We weren't trying to be insensitive.""

While the immediate concern following the fire was with loss of homes, the Sayre fire also caused extensive damage to nine parks, including Stetson Ranch, El Cariso and Wilson Canyon Park in Sylmar, Placerita Canyon Nature Center, Whitney Canyon Park and Elsmere Canyon in Newhall, and O'Melveny Park in Granada Hills. Veterans Memorial Park in Sylmar suffered severe fire damage, including destruction of a 2,000-square-foot (190 m^{2}) administration building and a cactus garden. The organizers of the first Pasadena marathon were forced to cancel the event due to the heavy smoke in the air.

A rally protesting the passage of a ballot initiative banning gay marriage had been expected to draw 40,000 protesters to Downtown Los Angeles on November 15, 2008, but drew only 8,000, which some attributed to the evacuations, freeway closures, and traffic jams resulting from the Sayre Fire. Mayor Villaraigosa attended the rally between news conferences at the Sayre Fire site. The Los Angeles Department of Water and Power ("DWP") had a major converter station in Sylmar and was forced to impose rolling blackouts, temporarily cutting off electricity to residents in Sherman Oaks, Mid City, Crenshaw, and other areas for about 25 minutes.

== See also ==
- Bel Air Fire (1961)
- Freeway Complex Fire
- Montecito Tea Fire
- November 2008 California wildfires
- Skirball Fire
- Hurst Fire
- Saddleridge Fire
