= Lalo García (artist) =

Mexican artist

Lalo Garcia is a Mexican artist. His artwork frequently depicts Our Lady of Guadalupe and has been displayed across Southern California, United States.

== Early life ==
García was born in Las Cieneguitas, a rural community in Tanhuato, Michoacán, Mexico. In 1965, at the age of 13, he emigrated to the United States with his family, where he was reunited with his father, who had emigrated in 1949 under the Bracero Program.

As a child, García drew infrequently and would sketch on the backs of paper bags from his local grocery store, reluctant to ask his parents for sketchbooks. His elementary school vice-principal noticed the drawings and, upon learning García had never taken art classes, enrolled him in formal instruction.

== Career ==
In 1978, García founded El Grupo Folklórico Fiesta Mexicana, a folkloric dance organization in San Fernando, California, through which he participated in traditional Aztec dance as a director and choreographer, performing across the United States and Mexico. In 1987, he began working as an artist and designer for Martinez & Murphy, Inc., a liturgical arts company in Los Angeles, producing artwork for the Archdiocese of Los Angeles. In 1988, García participated in a tour alongside singer Linda Ronstadt, contributing to performances of Canciones de mi Padre and Más Canciones.

One of the defining characteristics of Garcia's art is the lack of facial features in the figures represented in his work, as he believes that they should be left to the imagination of the viewer in order to make the image more personal. García frequently incorporates Our Lady of Guadalupe, also known as the Virgin of Guadalupe, into his work, describing her as essential to his art. He is a Catholic and devotee of Our Lady of Guadalupe.

García's artwork is displayed across Southern California, particularly in several Catholic churches across the Archdiocese of Los Angeles. In 1988, he was commissioned to create an art piece which is displayed outside the Cathedral of Our Lady of the Angels in downtown Los Angeles, California.

In January 2021, García's mural Children in Cages was unveiled in San Fernando, having been approved by the city in September 2020. The work was created as part of a coalition of artists opposing the family separation policy of the United States government.

In 2023, another of Garcia's pieces, Protectora de Migrantes (English: Protector of Migrants) was installed at the Cathedral. This art piece is a 30 x 40 acrylic canvas painting, which portrays a modernist representation of Our Lady of Guadalupe surrounded by monarch butterflies. García stated that it served as "symbols of migration." The artist claimed that "[the painting] does give you the feeling like she’s sitting curled up, protecting those butterflies," which he emphasized added a sacred element to the painting.
