= Veterans Memorial Park (Sylmar, California) =

Veterans Memorial Community Regional Park
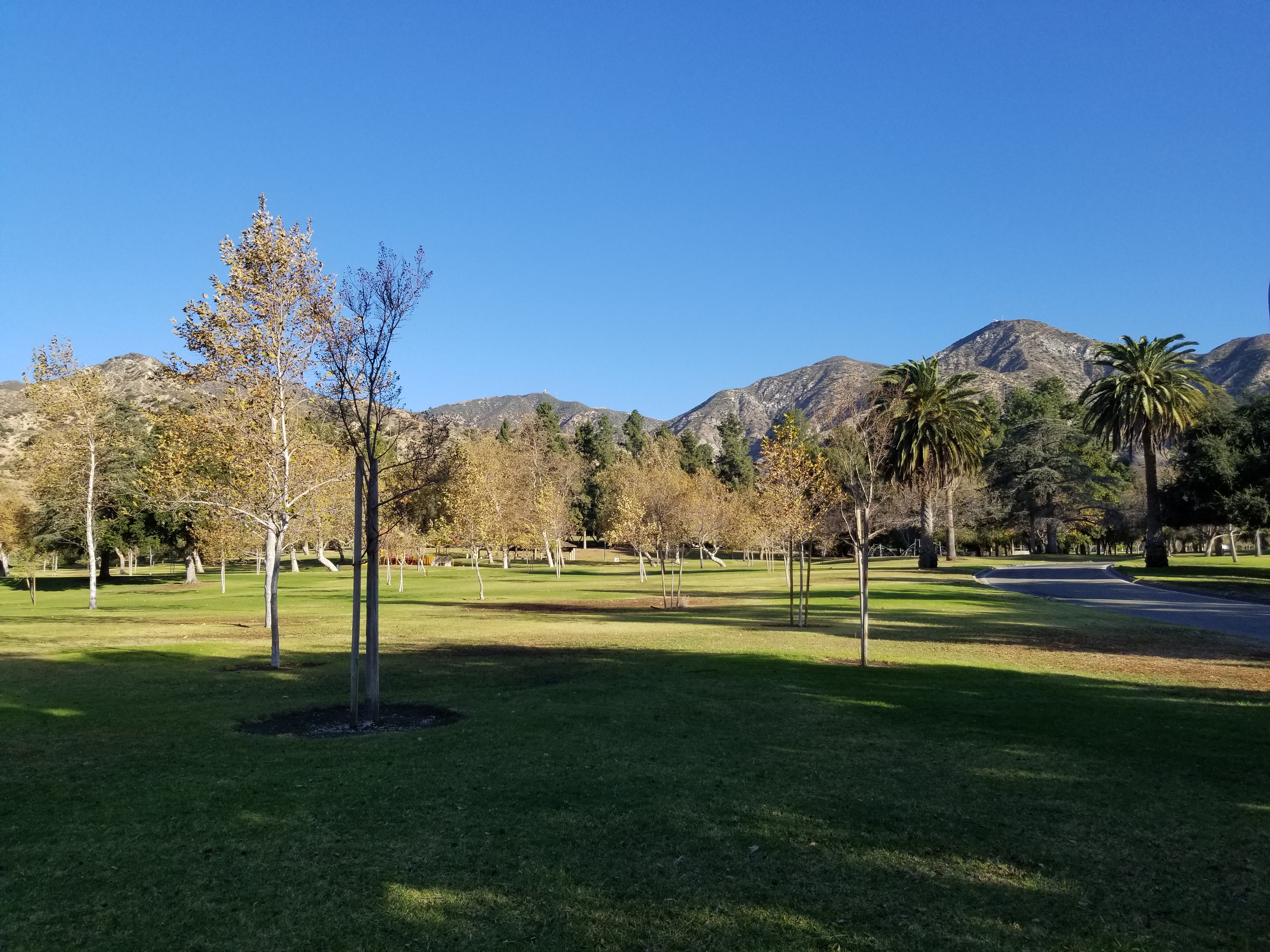
- The park in December, 2017.
- Interactive map of Veterans Memorial Community Regional Park
- Type: County park
- Location: Sylmar, Los Angeles
- Coordinates: 34°19′35″N 118°25′0″W
- Area: 97 acres (39 ha)
- Established: 1979
- Website: parks.lacounty.gov/veterans-memorial-community-regional-park

The Veterans Memorial Community Regional Park is a large, 97-acre (39 ha), county park in the neighborhood of Sylmar in Los Angeles, California. It is on the foothills of the San Gabriel Mountains at the northeastern edge of the San Fernando Valley. The park includes grassy picnic areas, a large pavilion, camping areas, and a community recreation building.

It borders the Angeles National Forest in the north; access is provided to the forest via the May Canyon Road and surrounding hiking trails. There is an 18-hole disc golf course in the south of the park.

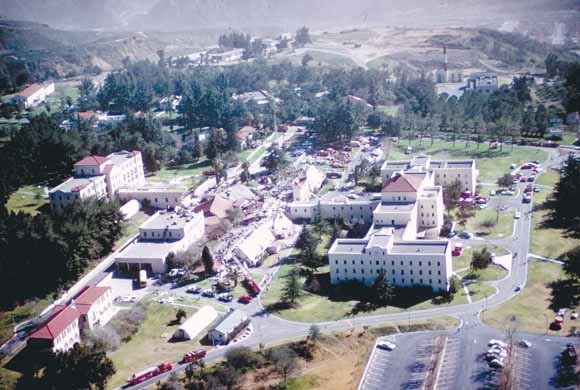
Aerial view of the partially destroyed Veterans Hospital.

The park occupies the site of the San Fernando Veterans Administration Hospital built in the 1940s which was severely damaged by the 1971 Sylmar Earthquake. The United States' government transferred ownership of the property to the County of Los Angeles in 1972 and the hospital was demolished. The park was dedicated in 1979.

The park has suffered fire damage on multiple occasions due to its proximity to fire-prone mountains. In 1990, a brush fire damaged about 5 acres of the park. In November 2008, the Sayre Fire started near the park and caused severe fire damage to the park itself, including the destruction of the 2,000-square-foot (190 m^{2}) administration building, a drawbridge gate, water supply equipment and a cactus garden. Access to the park was restricted by fire officials and at first not even park staff were allowed to enter.
