= López Adobe =

Historic house in California, United States

- Lopez Adobe
- U.S. National Register of Historic Places
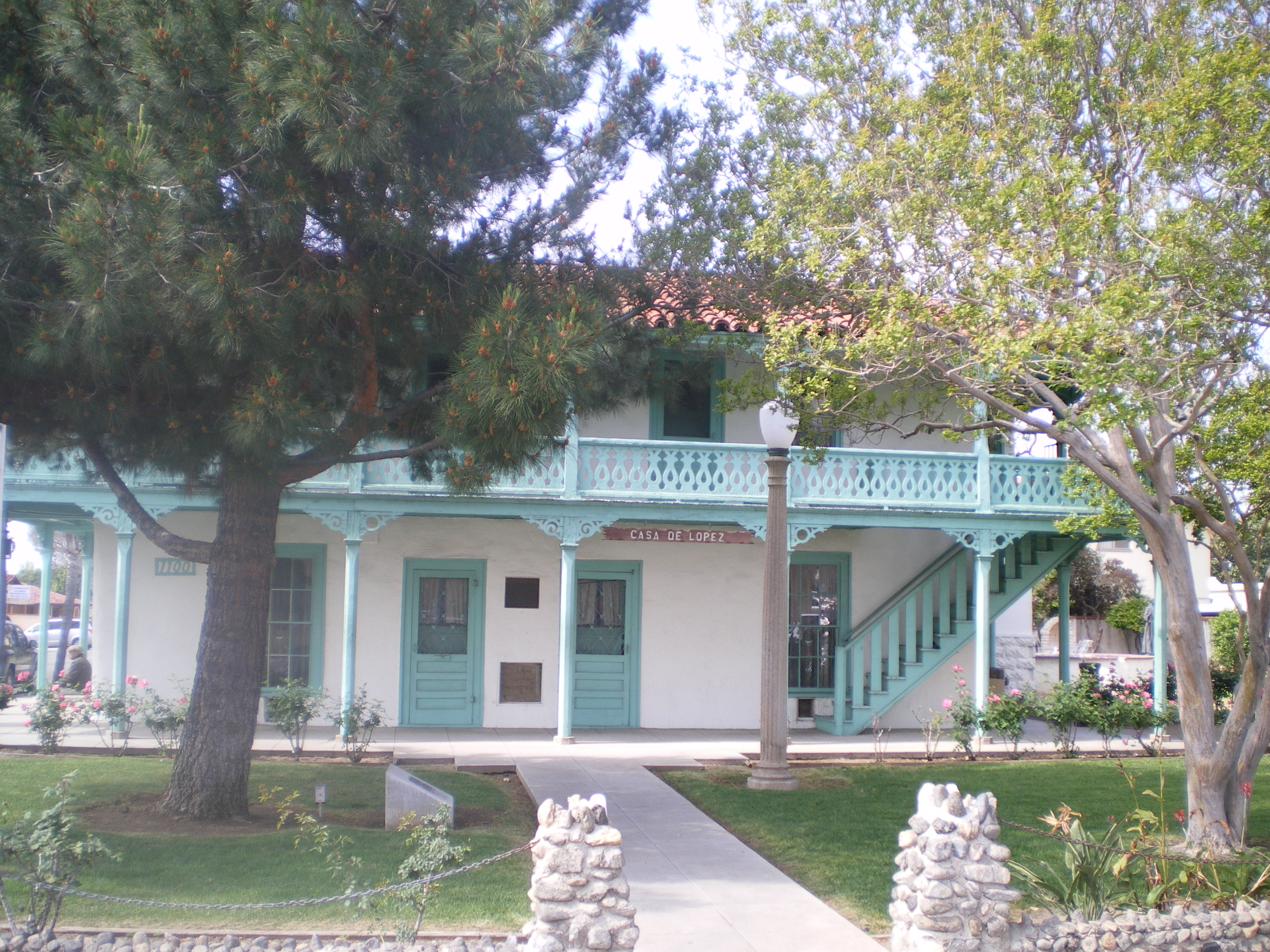
- Lopez Adobe, 2008

- Location within the Los Angeles metropolitan area Location within California Location within the United States
- Location: 1100 Pico St., San Fernando, California
- Coordinates: 34°16′55″N 118°26′33″W
- Built: 1882
- Architect: Lopez, Valentino
- Architectural style: Monterey
- NRHP reference No.: 71000157
- Added to NRHP: May 6, 1971

López Adobe, located at 1100 Pico Street in San Fernando, California, is one of the two oldest private residences in the San Fernando Valley. Built in 1882 by early settlers of the San Fernando Valley a short distance from the San Fernando Mission, it was listed on the National Register of Historic Places in 1971.

The Grand-Reopening of the property occurred on March 22, 2015, and is now open for public tours once every 4th Sunday of every month from 12-4 P.M.

== Gerónimo and Catalina López ==
Gerónimo López, born in the pueblo de Los Ángeles in 1828, had served as an army messenger in 1847 for Andrés Pico during the Mexican–American War, delivering the Articles of Capitulation to General John C. Fremont, that ended the war in southern Alta California. Catalina López was the only daughter of Pedro López, the second mayordomo of the San Fernando Rey de España Mission, where she was raised; she remained at the mission until 1847 when she moved to Los Ángeles, returning later as the bride of Gerónimo López.

=== López Station ===
Gerónimo and Catalina López purchased 40 acres (160,000 m^{2}) of land near the Mission San Fernando in 1861 and built an adobe home along the Butterfield Overland Mail 1st Division, on the Stockton - Los Angeles Road wagon route that connected Los Angeles and San Francisco. The original adobe became known as López Station.

The couple also operated the San Fernando Valley's first general store, its first English language school, and the first post office (in 1869) at the site.

One account of the early days of the San Fernando Valley noted the significance of the López family:

In the late 1860s and early 1870s a traveler riding through the high wild mustard fields of the San Fernando Valley would find little evidence of people except for the mission, a few other adobes, cattle grazing in the fields and a stage house built by Gerónimo López and his wife, Catalina. ... The López family played an important role in the valley's development and were responsible for establishing the first post office and the first English-speaking school.

The original López Station adobe was destroyed in the 1910s for the construction of the San Fernando Reservoir (later renamed Van Norman Reservoir), part of the then new Los Angeles Aqueduct system. After the 1971 San Fernando earthquake the foundation was again exposed in the reservoir basin. It was later covered by the vehicle track when the Los Angeles Police Department built the Davis Training Center in the late 1990s.

Senator Charles Maclay and his partners George K. and Benjamin F. Porter bought the remaining northern half of the Rancho Ex-Mission San Fernando from Eulogio de Celis in 1874. Maclay would own the east portion in which the López's land lied and he would proceed to lay out the new town of San Fernando, adjoining the railroad which arrived in the valley the same year the ex-mission rancho lands were purchased.

=== López Adobe ===
==== 19th century ====
Between 1882 and 1883, the López family built a larger adobe using 24-by-6-inch, sun-baked blocks. The surviving adobe home was built by Valentin López, Gerónimo's cousin and brother-in-law. It was the first two-story adobe built as a residence in the San Fernando Valley. It is considered the City of San Fernando's oldest standing building.

It has been recognized for its blend of Mission Revival and Victorian architectural styles. Catalina López designed the residence's Victorian features. The first local newspaper, the San Fernando Times, was printed in April 1889 from the López Adobe.

==== 20th century ====
Catalina López died in 1918, and Gerónimo López died in 1921, at age 90. In 1928, several modifications were made to the house by one of the López daughters, Louisa López McAlonan. The balcony staircase was changed, and some rooms were divided to form apartments. Modern plumbing and electrical fixtures were also added at the time. The original shake shingle roof was also replaced by clay tile roof.

Members of the López family continued living in the adobe until 1961. The last López to live in the adobe was another daughter, Kate López Millen, who lived in an upper apartment from 1931 until shortly before her death in 1961. The property remained in the López family until 1971.

== Purchase by the City of San Fernando ==
The City of San Fernando announced plans to purchase the property from the López family in 1970, but took more than a year to come up with the $70,000 purchase price. Plans to obtain a HUD grant fell through, and in early 1971, the owners imposed a deadline on the purchase, and indicated the building would be razed and the land cleared. When the adobe was listed on the National Register of Historic Places in May 1971, HUD finally agreed to provide a $40,000 historical preservation grant, and the purchase was completed in late 1971.

== Funding and operation as a museum ==
The building was restored between 1974 and 1975 and opened as a historical site in 1975. The adobe is operated by the San Fernando Historical Site and Preservation Commission. Funding difficulties hampered the city's plans to fully renovate the property and to operate it as a full-time museum and tourist attraction. The adobe was operated by volunteers, and was initially open only three days a week. That was later reduced to one Sunday per month. In 1983, the adobe's volunteer curator, Carolyn Riggs, noted: "Unfortunately, the city is so small that it can barely support its school, fire and police systems. There's just no money to support it except for what we have scraped together."

In 1982, more than 100 descendants of the López family gathered at the adobe to celebrate its 100th anniversary. Gerónimo and Catalina López had thirteen children, nine of whom survived to adulthood.

== Historic significance and designation as historic site ==
Though the City of San Fernando is the oldest town in the San Fernando Valley, the López Adobe is all that remains of its early years. The authors of An Architectural Guidebook to Los Angeles observed: "The one remaining shred of the Victorian period is the Gerónimo López Adobe (1878) at the northwest corner of Pico Street and Maclay Avenue. It is two-story Monterey style with some pretty Queen Anne sawed gingerbread across the gallery. Otherwise, all signs of the old town have disappeared, except for the railroad." In the book, Historic Adobes of Los Angeles County, the author also makes note of the woodwork along the balconies: "One of the striking features of the house is that the upper and lower stories have verandas with hand cut wooden railings and a jigsaw pattern balustrade, which is painted in a turquoise blue. This beautiful house is furnished to reflect the period between 1883 and 1910."

The J. Paul Getty Trust gave a "Preserve L.A." grant to the adobe in 2002, and described the structure's importance as follows: "Built in 1882 for Mexican army officer Don Gerónimo López, the López Adobe is an important example of California architecture during the transitional period following the decline of the missions and the extensive development of the Gold Rush era. Over the years, the López Adobe has become a cultural icon for the city, and is one of the few historic structures to survive the earthquakes of 1971 (Sylmar) and 1994 (Northridge)."

The López Adobe has been recognized as a significant historical site at both the state and national level.

- In 1945, the adobe was dedicated as a State Historic Landmark. At the time, the Los Angeles Times reported: "Its architecture is Spanish California adobe, a two-story structure with overhanging balcony and outside stairway. It is the only remaining building of Old San Fernando."
- In 1968, the building was registered with the State of California Office of Historic Preservation.
- In 1971, the adobe was listed on the National Register of Historical Places.

== Closure following Northridge earthquake ==
The adobe was damaged in the 1994 Northridge earthquake and was closed for three years while repairs were made. Repairs were delayed when officials from the Federal Emergency Management Agency (FEMA) disputed the city's $230,000 estimate of repair costs and seismic upgrades. In April 1996, FEMA and city officials finally agreed on quake-repair funding of approximately $100,000, considerably less than the nearly $200,000 eventually spent on the work. City funds covered the rest of the cost.

== Recent years ==
The adobe reopened in December 1997 with a ceremony that included seasonal songs, Mexican dances, and the lighting of the town Christmas tree.

In 2003, Congressman Howard Berman (D-CA) obtained $150,000 in federal funding for the historic preservation of the López Adobe. Berman said at the time: "I pursued this funding, because the López Adobe is a national treasure and deserves federal money to help with its preservation. This historic building is a source of pride for the City of San Fernando and the entire San Fernando Valley. I am pleased to play a role in helping to save it."

As of 2004, funding constraints prevented the city from opening the adobe more than one day per month. At that time, the adobe was open on the fourth Sunday of the month from 1 to 4 p.m. Despite years of fund-raising efforts, the city and preservation groups had managed at that time to collect only half of the $750,000 needed to restore the López Adobe. This lack of funding prevented the property from being open for tours to the public from 2007 to 2015.

The Grand-Reopening of the property occurred on March 22, 2015, and is now open for public (docent-led) tours once every fourth Sunday of the month from 12-4 p.m.

== See also ==
- History of the San Fernando Valley
- Butterfield Overland Mail in California
- List of Registered Historic Places in Los Angeles County, California
