= Concordia Christian School =

Private school in Los Angeles, California

Location
- Granada Hills, Los Angeles, California; United States
- Coordinates: 34.27222°N 118.49417°W

Information
- Type: Private
- Religious affiliation(s): Non-denominational Christian
- Principal: Katherine Moore
- Grades: Preschool—8th Grade
- Website: www.concordiagranadahills.com

The Concordia Christian School is a private non-denominational Christian elementary and middle school located in Granada Hills, Los Angeles, California, in the United States. The school serves preschool to 8th Grade children from the local area.

== History ==
Prior to its establishment as a Christian school, Concordia Christian School was part of The Concordia Schools, a system of private K–12 Lutheran schools in the San Fernando Valley region of Greater Los Angeles. The system headquarters were on the property of Concordia Jr/Sr High School in Sylmar, Los Angeles, prior to the school's closure in June 2016.

=== Former schools ===
- Los Angeles Lutheran High School (Sylmar, Los Angeles). Formerly at the location of Concordia Jr/Sr High School before the merger. Housed the system offices prior to the closure of Concordia Jr/Sr High School in 2016.
- Concordia Jr/Sr High School (Sylmar, Los Angeles, 6–12).
  - Formed by the merger of Los Angeles Lutheran High School and First Lutheran Schools of San Fernando. As of 2011 it had 260 students, making it the largest of the campuses of the system. The school formally closed following commencement of the 2015-16 academic school year.
- Concordia Canoga Park (Canoga Park, Los Angeles, K–12)
  - Formed by the merger of Trinity Lutheran High School and Canoga Park Lutheran School.
- Trinity Lutheran High School (Canoga Park, Los Angeles)
- First Lutheran Schools (San Fernando, K–12)
- Concordia San Fernando (San Fernando, K–6)
- Canoga Park Lutheran School
- Concordia Burbank (Burbank, Jr, K–6)
