= Olive View–UCLA Medical Center =

- Los Angeles County Department of Health Services

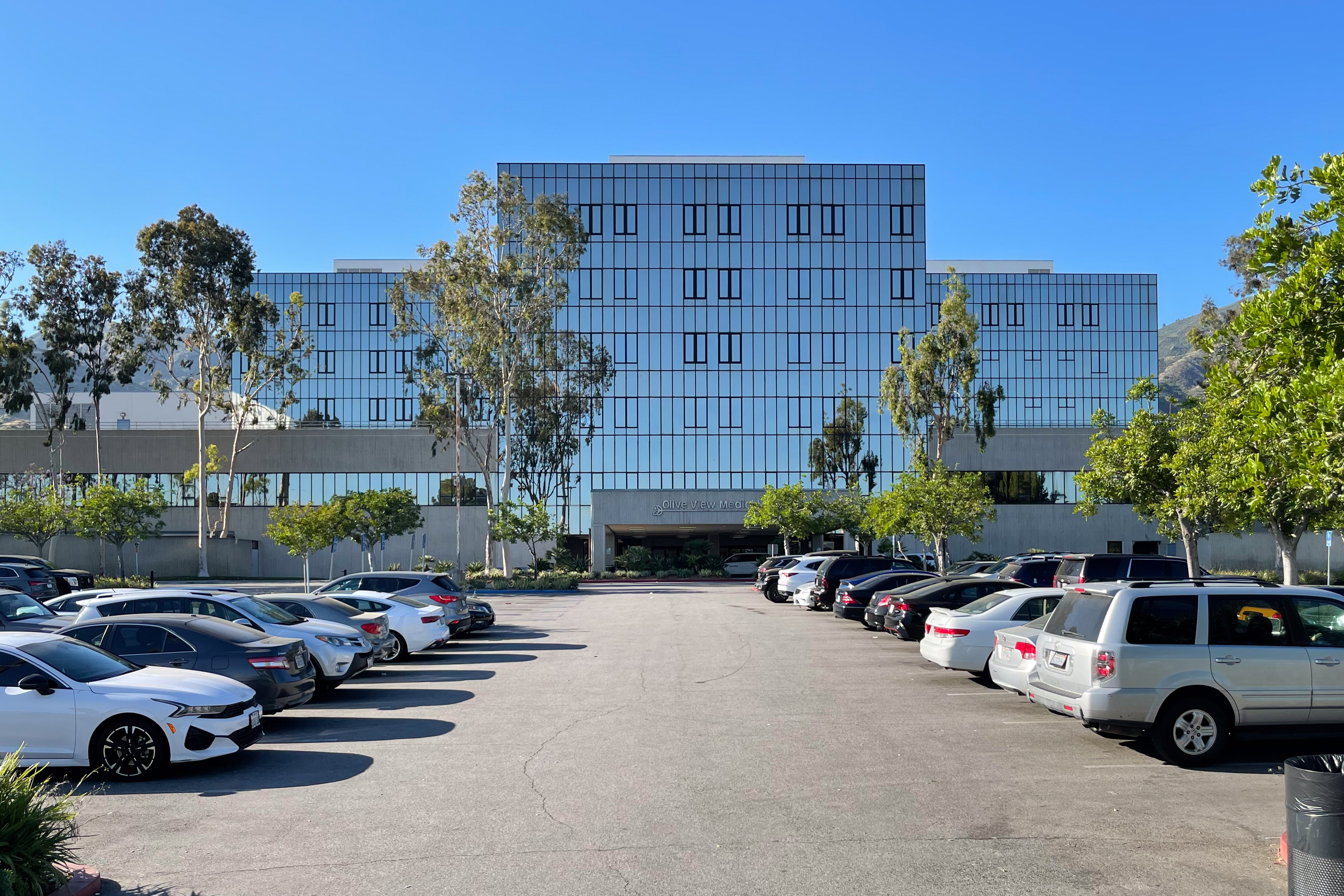
- Olive View Medical Center in 2023

Geography
- Location: 14445 Olive View Dr., Sylmar, California, United States
- Coordinates: 34.32585°N 118.44576°W

Organization
- Care system: Public
- Type: Teaching
- Affiliated university: University of California, Los Angeles

Services
- Beds: 355

History
- Founded: October 27, 1920; 106 years ago

Links
- Website: dhs.lacounty.gov/wps/portal/dhs/oliveview
- Lists: Hospitals in California

Olive View–UCLA Medical Center is a hospital, funded by Los Angeles County, located in the Sylmar neighborhood of Los Angeles, California, United States. It is one of the primary healthcare delivery systems in the north San Fernando Valley, serving the area's large working-class population. Olive View is also the closest county hospital serving the Antelope Valley after High Desert Hospital was converted to an urgent care clinic in 2003.

== Overview ==
The 355-bed replacement facility built on the old Sylmar site was opened on May 8, 1987. Olive View incorporated UCLA in its name, becoming Olive View–UCLA Medical Center in 1992. In May 1997, Olive View–UCLA Medical Center became a part of ValleyCare, which maintains responsibility for the care of the medically indigent, low income, uninsured residents of the San Fernando and Santa Clarita Valleys.

Olive View–UCLA Medical Center has an affiliation with the David Geffen School of Medicine at UCLA, offering residency programs in major specialty areas as well as providing an on-campus School of Nursing. It is also a rotation site for medical students at UCLA.

== History ==
The hospital was founded on October 27, 1920, as a tuberculosis (TB) sanatorium to relieve overcrowding at County General Hospital, and when it was no longer needed for TB treatment, the facilities became an acute care hospital in 1970. In 1962, Olive View Hospital performed the first open heart surgery successfully in the San Fernando Valley, and one of the first in Southern California.

The hospital was known as Olive View Hospital before it became affiliated with the University of California, Los Angeles's School of Medicine in 1970. Olive View Hospital became Olive View Medical Center, a teaching hospital and a new 888-bed hospital was dedicated in December, 1970.

The hospital was severely damaged six weeks after it opened during the 1971 San Fernando earthquake on February 9, 1971, which caused the collapse of the four stairwell wings, as well as the parking structure. The first floor columns of the five-story main structure nearly failed as well, shifting the entire building 18 inches off center to the north, which nearly brought down the entire structure. The building was damaged beyond repair, and subsequently vacated, abandoned, and demolished by implosion in two phases, with the first demolition taking place on May 31, 1973 followed by the second one on July 26, 1973. For the next sixteen years, Olive View served its patients through an interim facility at MidValley in Van Nuys.

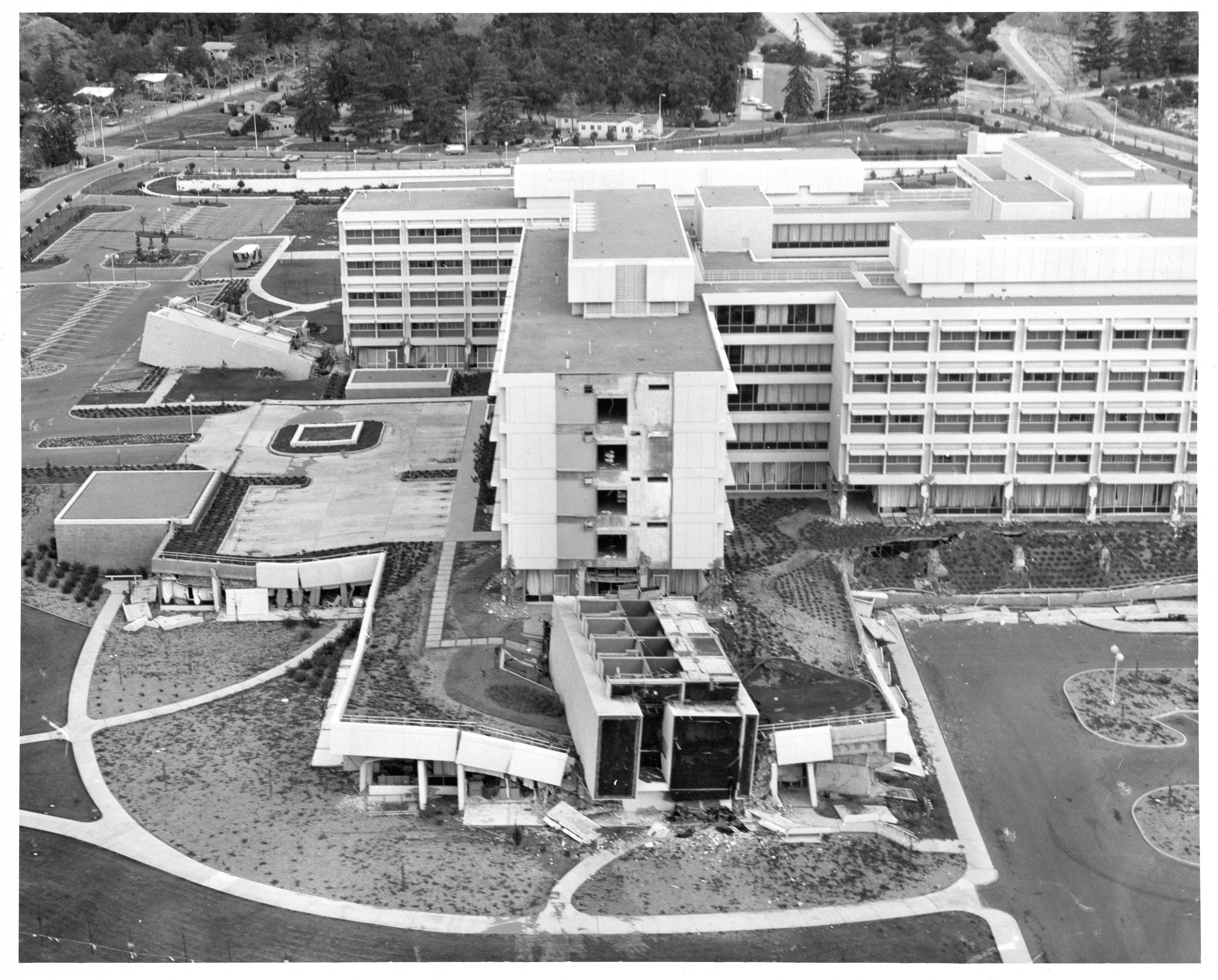
Earthquake damage to the hospital, 1971

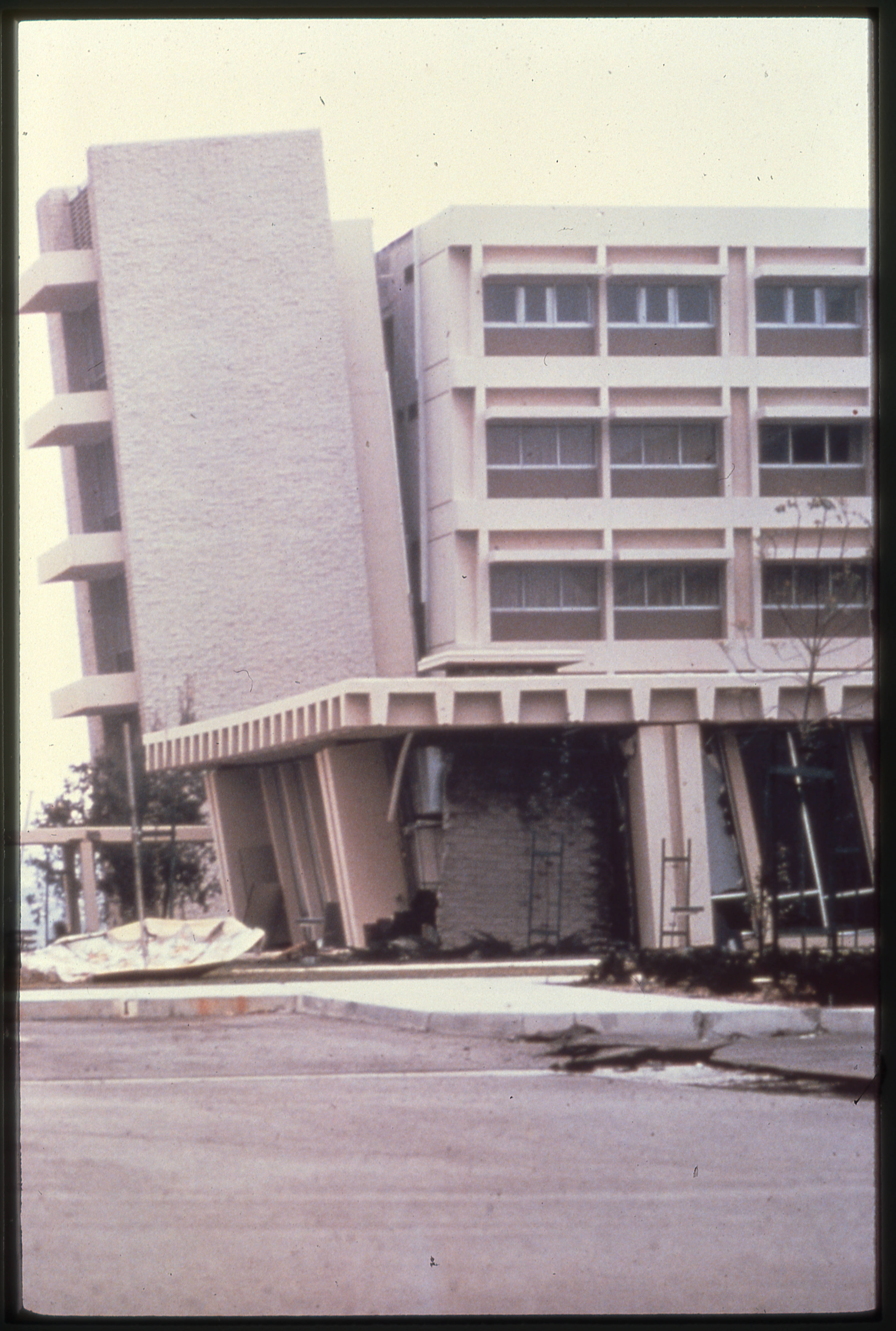
Earthquake damage

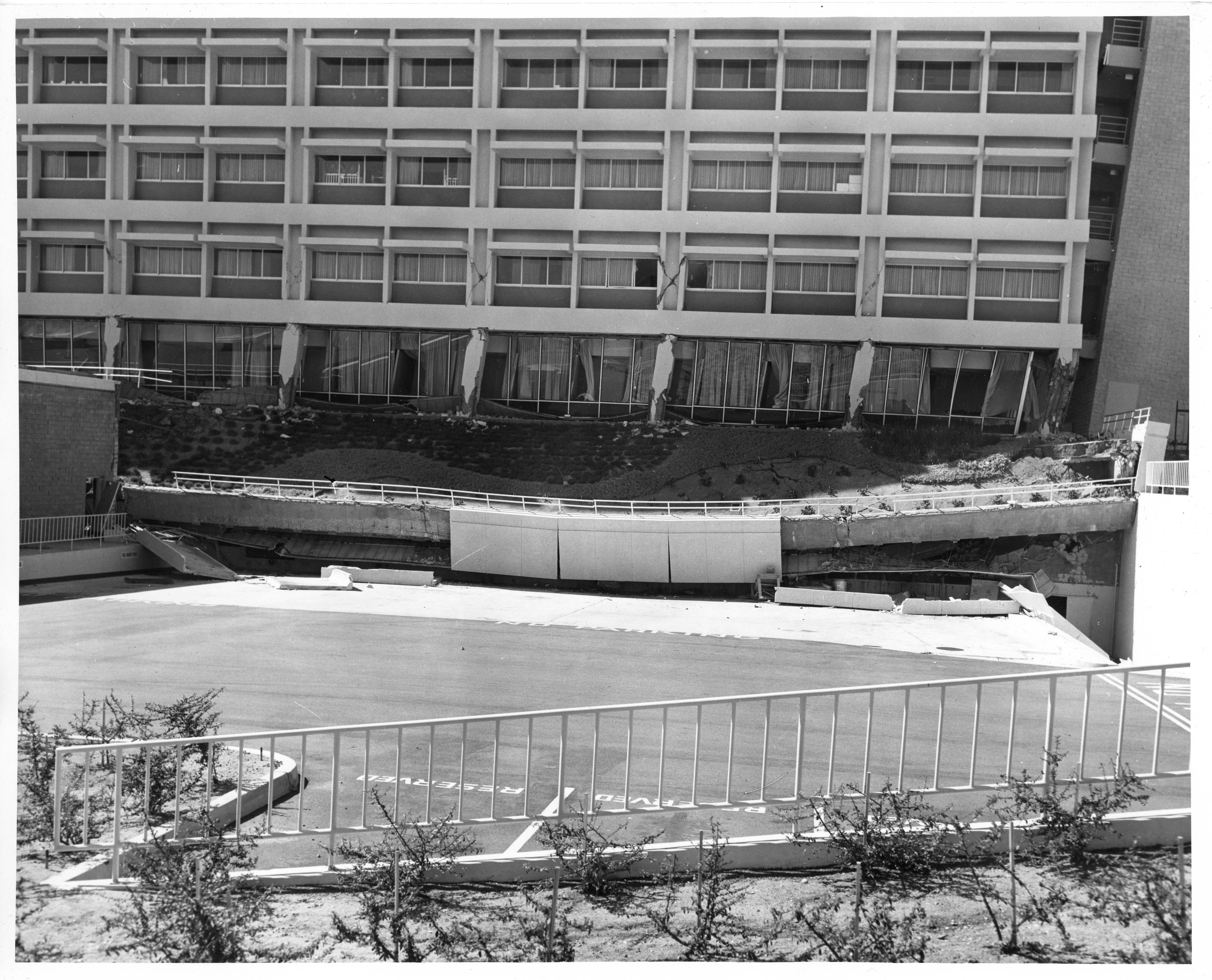
North wing, showing basement collapse, first floor column damage and second floor stress crack

On March 9, 1975, Department of Health Services Security Officer Murray F. Olsen was killed in the line of duty on the grounds of Olive View Medical Center. Olsen observed a suspect crash his truck through the gates of the medical center parking lot, and race onto the vacant hospital grounds. Pursuing the suspect in his county patrol car, he made a vehicle stop and confronted the suspect, Steven Vyeda of Watsonville, CA. Responding LAPD officers found Officer Olson deceased on the ground next to his vehicle; he had been stabbed and then shot with his own weapon. His official cause of death was "contusion of spinal cord, gunshot wound to face, multiple stab wounds" per the Coroner's report. The suspect was shot and killed by LAPD officers later that day.

The rebuilt Olive View–UCLA Medical Center was opened in 1987. In June 1992, Los Angeles County Board of Supervisors approved postgraduate physicians from Cedars-Sinai Medical Center to work at Olive View–UCLA Medical Center. Physicians can now receive training not available at Cedars-Sinai. Olive View–UCLA Medical Center in Sylmar is provided with three additional doctors at a cost to the county of $9,000 a month.

The 2008 Sayre Fire caused damage to several outbuildings, and led to an evacuation of the intensive care patients from the hospital.

== In popular culture ==
Before the 1973 demolition, the hospital served as a filming location, where it played itself in a 1973 episode of the Emergency! television show. It also served as the set for a nuclear war-damaged then-futuristic jail facility in the TV series Mission Impossible in the seventh-season episode "Two Thousand".

The current facility was used in scenes for the 1987 film Over the Top starring Sylvester Stallone.

== Notable staff ==
- Selma Calmes, co-founder of the Anesthesia History Association, former chair of the department of anesthesiology.

== See also ==
- Harbor–UCLA Medical Center
- UCLA Medical Center, Santa Monica
- Ronald Reagan UCLA Medical Center
