= San Fernando, California =

City in California, United States

- City
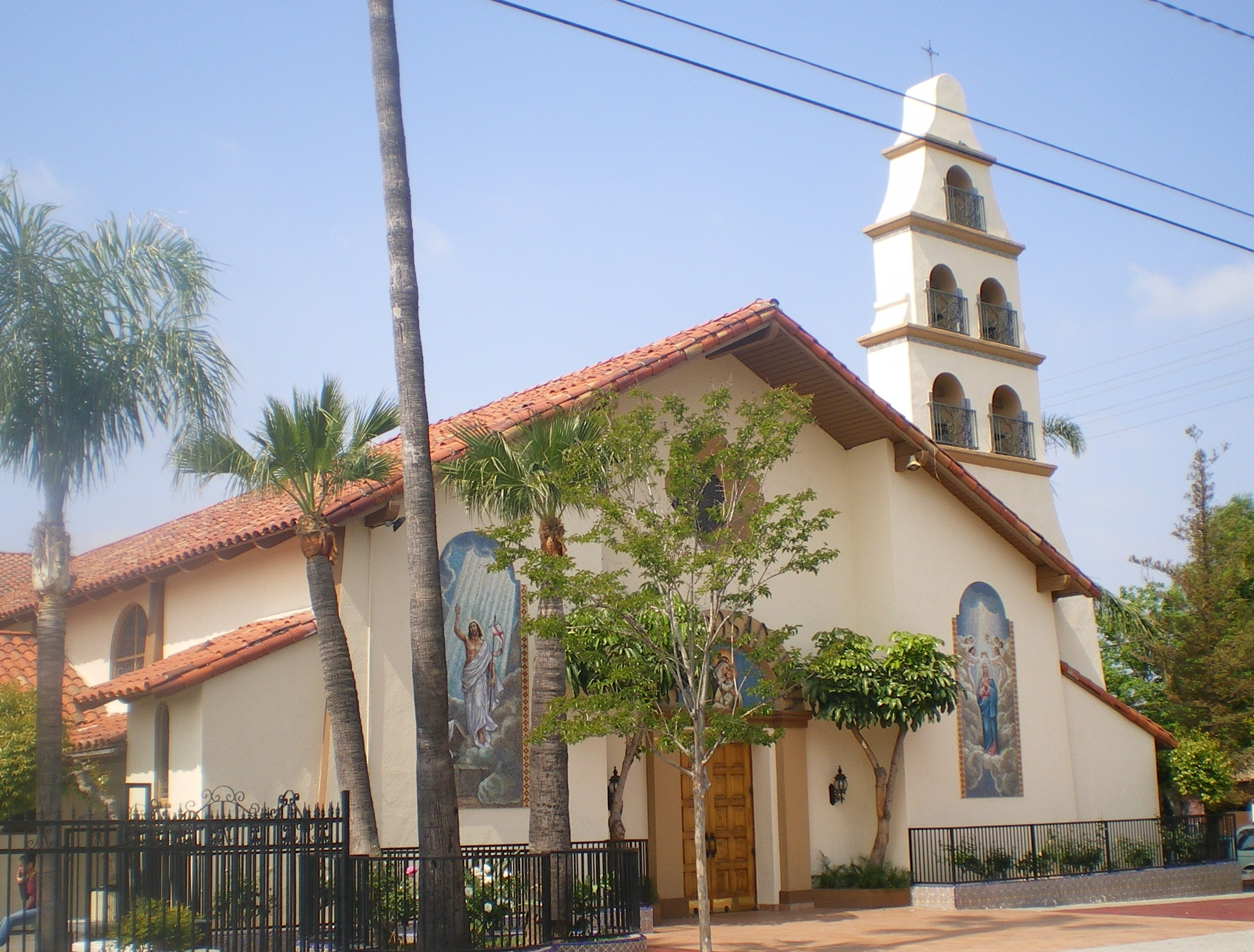
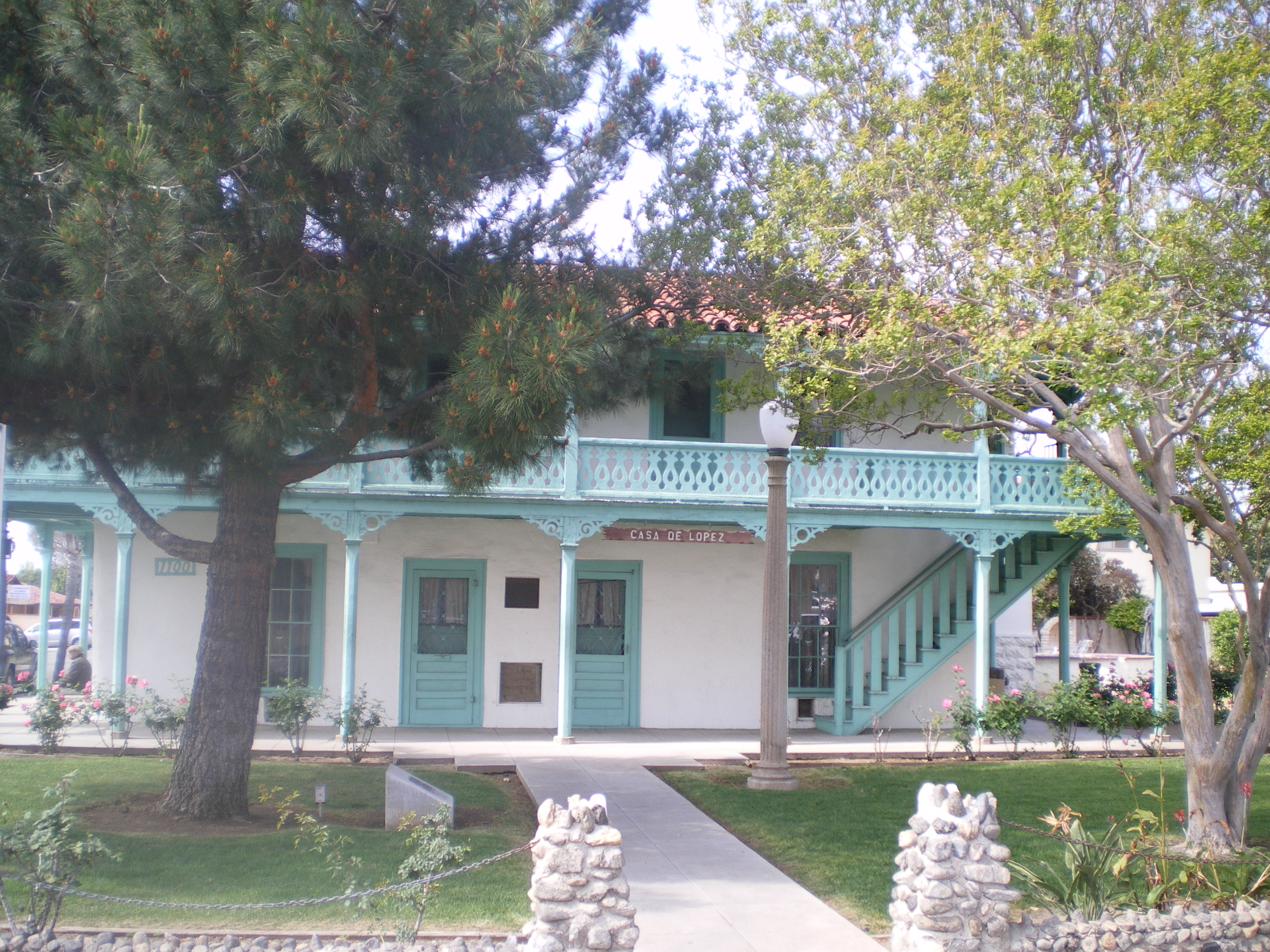
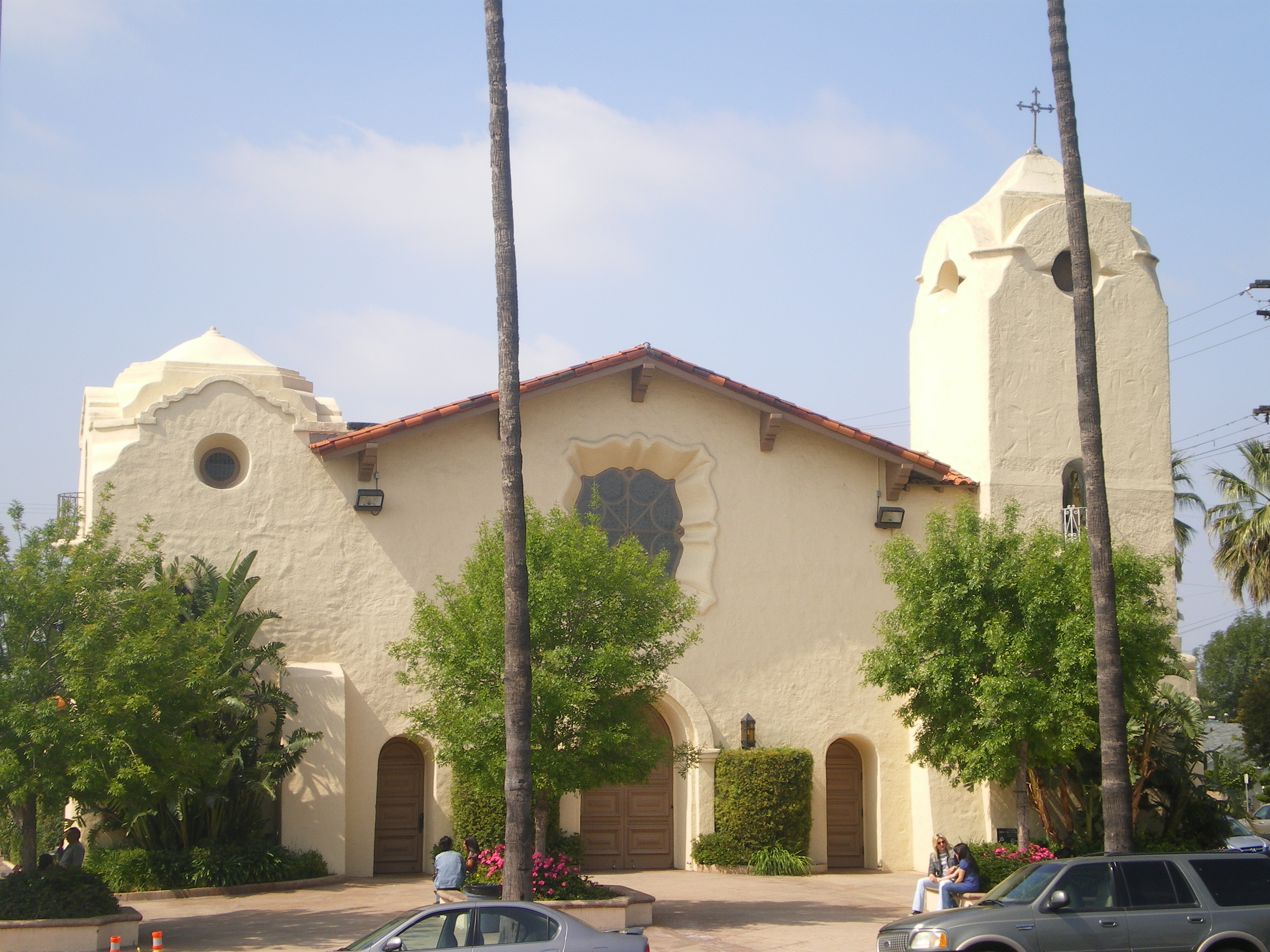
- Santa Rosa Church Lopez Adobe Saint Ferdinand Catholic Church

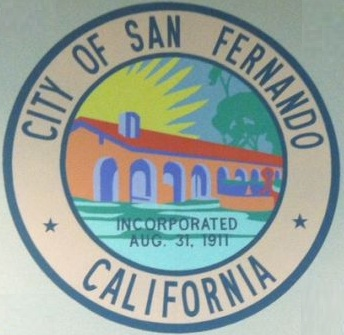
- Seal
- Coordinates: 34°17′14″N 118°26′20″W
- Country: United States
- State: California
- County: Los Angeles
- Incorporated: August 31, 1911
- Named for: St. Ferdinand

Government
  - Type: Council–manager
  - Mayor: Victoria Garcia
  - Vice mayor: Patty Lopez
  - City council: Mary Mendoza; Mary Solorio; Victoria Garcia; Patty López; Sean Rivas

Area
  - Total: 2.37 sq mi (6.15 km^{2})
  - Land: 2.37 sq mi (6.15 km^{2})
  - Water: 0 sq mi (0.00 km^{2}) 0%
- Elevation: 1,070 ft (326 m)

Population (2020)
  - Total: 23,946
  - Estimate (2024): 23,488
  - Density: 67,662.6/sq mi (26,124.69/km^{2})
- Time zone: UTC-8 (PST)
  - Summer (DST): UTC-7 (PDT)
- ZIP Codes: 91340–91342, 91344–91346
- Area codes: 818, 747
- FIPS code: 06-66140
- GNIS feature IDs: 1652786, 2411785
- Website: www.sanfernando.gov

San Fernando (Spanish for "St. Ferdinand") is a general-law city in the San Fernando Valley region of Los Angeles County, California, United States, in the Los Angeles metropolitan area. It is an enclave in the City of Los Angeles. As of the 2020 census the population of San Fernando was 23,946.

== History ==
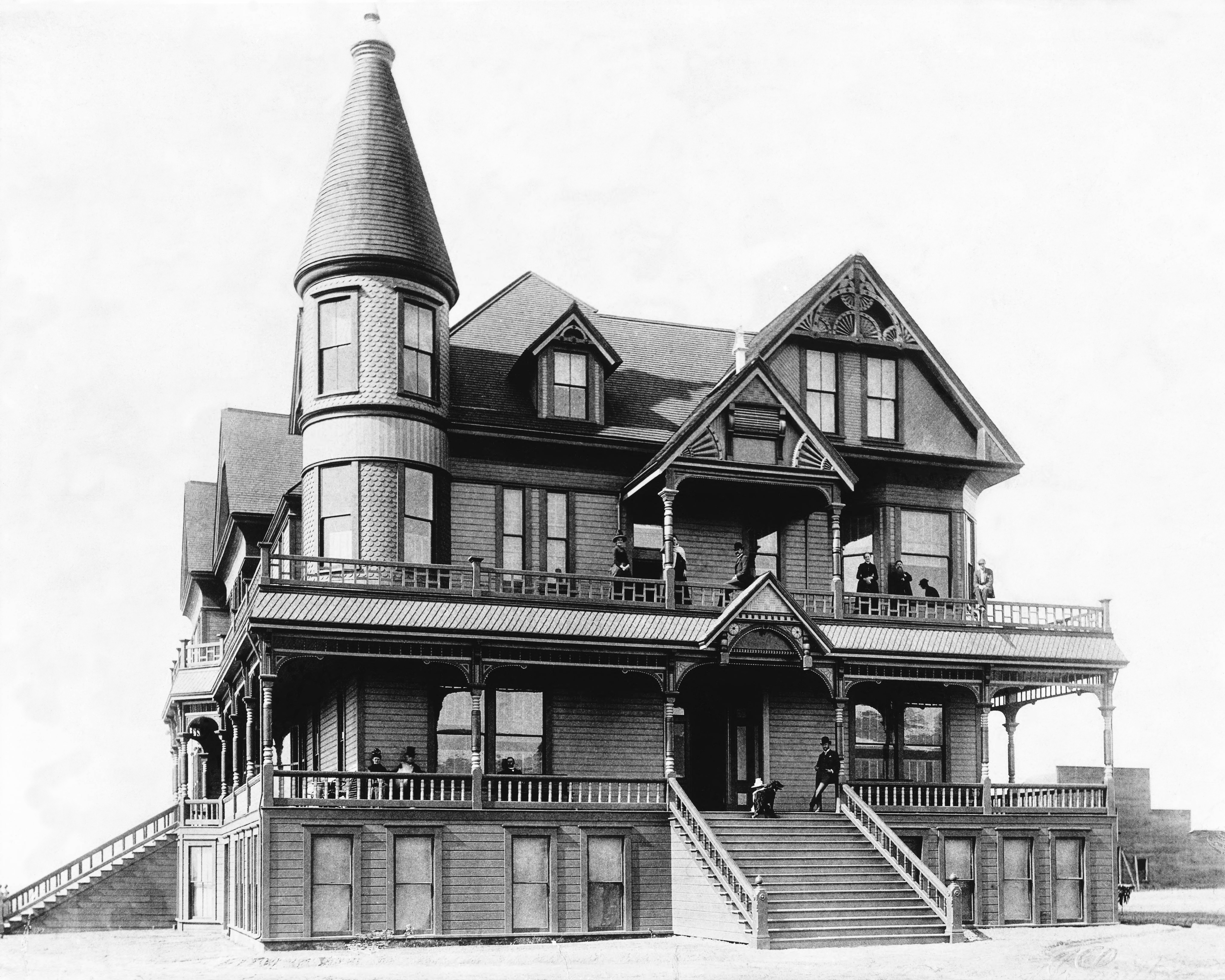
Mission Hotel in San Fernando, ca. 1888

Prior to the arrival of Spanish missionaries and soldiers, the area of San Fernando was in the northwestern extent of Tovaangar, or the homelands of the Tongva. The nearby village of Pasheeknga was a major site for the Tongva, being the most populous village in the San Fernando Valley at the time. The homelands of the Tataviam could be found to the north and the Chumash to the west.

=== Spanish colonial period ===
The Mission San Fernando Rey de España (named after St. Ferdinand) was founded in 1797 at the site of Achooykomenga, an agricultural rancho established by Juan Francisco Reyes for Pueblo de Los Ángeles worked by Ventureño Chumash, Fernandeño (Tongva), and Tataviam laborers.

In 1833, the mission was secularized by the Mexican government. During its time as a mission, 1,367 native children were baptized at San Fernando, of which 965 died in childhood. The high death rate of children and adults at the missions sometimes led those kept at the mission to run away.

=== Rancho land grant ===
In 1846, the area became part of the Mexican land grant of Rancho Ex-Mission San Fernando. In 1874, Charles Maclay, bought 56,000 acres (227 km^{2}) of the Rancho.

In 1882, cousins George K. Porter and Benjamin F. Porter, of future Porter Ranch, each received one-third of the total land. In 1885, Maclay founded the Maclay School of Theology, a Methodist seminary in San Fernando. After his death it became an affiliate and moved to the campus of the University of Southern California and then the Claremont School of Theology.

In August 1911, a motion to incorporate as an independent city passed by eight votes. While most of the towns in the surrounding San Fernando Valley agreed to annexation by Los Angeles in the 1910s, eager to tap the bountiful water supply provided by the newly opened Los Angeles Aqueduct, San Fernando's abundant groundwater supplies allowed it to remain a separate city.

== Geography and climate ==
San Fernando is completely surrounded by the city of Los Angeles, with the neighborhoods of Sylmar to the north, Lake View Terrace to the east, Pacoima to the south, and Mission Hills to the west. It is served by the Golden State (Interstate 5), Foothill (Interstate 210), Ronald Reagan (State Route 118), and San Diego (Interstate 405) freeways.

Climate data for San Fernando, California
Month	Jan	Feb	Mar	Apr	May	Jun	Jul	Aug	Sep	Oct	Nov	Dec	Year
Record high °F (°C)	92 (33)	92 (33)	98 (37)	103 (39)	105 (41)	114 (46)	113 (45)	112 (44)	114 (46)	106 (41)	97 (36)	90 (32)	114 (46)
Mean daily maximum °F (°C)	66 (19)	68 (20)	70 (21)	75 (24)	78 (26)	84 (29)	92 (33)	93 (34)	88 (31)	81 (27)	72 (22)	66 (19)	78 (26)
Mean daily minimum °F (°C)	43 (6)	45 (7)	44 (7)	46 (8)	51 (11)	55 (13)	58 (14)	60 (16)	58 (14)	53 (12)	46 (8)	43 (6)	50 (10)
Record low °F (°C)	23 (−5)	26 (−3)	28 (−2)	30 (−1)	32 (0)	36 (2)	40 (4)	41 (5)	39 (4)	31 (−1)	28 (−2)	26 (−3)	23 (−5)
Average precipitation inches (mm)	4.14 (105)	4.52 (115)	3.85 (98)	0.96 (24)	0.25 (6.4)	0.07 (1.8)	0.03 (0.76)	0.15 (3.8)	0.34 (8.6)	0.52 (13)	1.48 (38)	2.27 (58)	18.58 (472)

== Demographics ==
Historical population
Census	Pop.	Note	%±
1920	3,204		—
1930	7,567		136.2%
1940	9,094		20.2%
1950	12,992		42.9%
1960	16,093		23.9%
1970	16,571		3.0%
1980	17,731		7.0%
1990	22,580		27.3%
2000	23,564		4.4%
2010	23,645		0.3%
2020	23,946		1.3%
2024 (est.)	23,488	▼	−1.9%
U.S. Decennial Census; 1860–1870 1880-1890; 1900 1910 1920; 1930 1940 1950; 1960 1970 1980; 1990 2000 2010; 2020

San Fernando first appeared as a city in the 1920 U.S. census which was coterminous with the now defunct San Fernando Township.

=== Racial and ethnic composition ===
San Fernando city, California – Racial and ethnic composition Note: the US Census treats Hispanic/Latino as an ethnic category. This table excludes Latinos from the racial categories and assigns them to a separate category. Hispanics/Latinos may be of any race.
Race / Ethnicity (NH = Non-Hispanic)	Pop 1980	Pop 1990	Pop 2000	Pop 2010	Pop 2020	% 1980	% 1990	% 2000	% 2010	% 2020
White alone (NH)	5,036	3,322	1,855	1,259	1,234	28.40%	14.71%	7.87%	5.32%	5.15%
Black or African American alone (NH)	104	206	176	146	282	0.59%	0.91%	0.75%	0.62%	1.18%
Native American or Alaska Native alone (NH)	91	65	122	66	66	0.51%	0.29%	0.52%	0.28%	0.28%
Asian alone (NH)	159	232	209	192	353	0.90%	1.03%	0.89%	0.81%	1.47%
Native Hawaiian or Pacific Islander alone (NH)	159	232	7	19	11	0.90%	1.03%	0.03%	0.08%	0.05%
Other race alone (NH)	122	72	16	14	76	0.69%	0.32%	0.07%	0.06%	0.32%
Mixed race or Multiracial (NH)	x	x	141	82	154	x	x	0.60%	0.35%	0.64%
Hispanic or Latino (any race)	12,219	18,683	21,038	21,867	21,770	68.91%	82.74%	89.28%	92.48%	90.91%
Total	17,731	22,580	23,564	23,645	23,946	100.00%	100.00%	100.00%	100.00%	100.00%

=== 2020 census ===
As of the 2020 census, San Fernando had a population of 23,946. The median age was 35.4 years. 23.6% of residents were under the age of 18 and 11.7% of residents were 65 years of age or older. For every 100 females there were 99.9 males, and for every 100 females age 18 and over there were 98.0 males age 18 and over. San Fernando had a population density of 10,086.80/sq miles or 26,124.69/km^{2}.

100.0% of residents lived in urban areas, while 0.0% lived in rural areas.

There were 6,358 households in San Fernando, of which 46.8% had children under the age of 18 living in them. Of all households, 49.5% were married-couple households, 16.9% were households with a male householder and no spouse or partner present, and 25.7% were households with a female householder and no spouse or partner present. About 13.4% of all households were made up of individuals and 5.7% had someone living alone who was 65 years of age or older.

There were 6,503 housing units, of which 2.2% were vacant. The homeowner vacancy rate was 0.2% and the rental vacancy rate was 1.3%.

=== Other demographics ===
The City of San Fernando's Annual Report states that the median household income was $77,334 with a total of 6,504 households. The same report states that 73.1% of residents speak a language other than English at home, that 71.2% of residents speak Spanish at home, and 28.1% of residents have limited English-speaking abilities.

=== 2010 census ===
At the 2010 census San Fernando had a population of 23,645. The population density was 9,959.9 inhabitants per square mile (3,845.5/km^{2}). The racial makeup of San Fernando was 12,068 (51.0%) White (5.3% Non-Hispanic White), 222 (0.9%) African American, 314 (1.3%) Native American, 248 (1.0%) Asian, 33 (0.1%) Pacific Islander, 9,877 (41.8%) from other races, and 883 (3.7%) from two or more races. There were 21,687 Hispanic or Latino residents, of any race (92.5%).

The census reported that 23,531 people (99.5% of the population) lived in households, 46 (0.2%) lived in non-institutionalized group quarters, and 68 (0.3%) were institutionalized.

There were 5,967 households, 3,247 (54.4%) had children under the age of 18 living in them, 3,282 (55.0%) were opposite-sex married couples living together, 1,098 (18.4%) had a female householder with no husband present, 592 (9.9%) had a male householder with no wife present. There were 476 (8.0%) unmarried opposite-sex partnerships, and 34 (0.6%) same-sex married couples or partnerships. 731 households (12.3%) were one person and 295 (4.9%) had someone living alone who was 65 or older. The average household size was 3.94. There were 4,972 families (83.3% of households); the average family size was 4.18.

The age distribution was 6,941 people (29.4%) under the age of 18, 2,659 people (11.2%) aged 18 to 24, 7,132 people (30.2%) aged 25 to 44, 4,920 people (20.8%) aged 45 to 64, and 1,993 people (8.4%) who were 65 or older. The median age was 30.7 years. For every 100 females, there were 100.7 males. For every 100 females age 18 and over, there were 98.2 males.

There were 6,291 housing units at an average density of 2,649.9 per square mile (1023.1/km^{2}), of the occupied units 3,252 (54.5%) were owner-occupied and 2,715 (45.5%) were rented. The homeowner vacancy rate was 1.1%; the rental vacancy rate was 3.9%. 13,425 people (56.8% of the population) lived in owner-occupied housing units and 10,106 people (42.7%) lived in rental housing units.

According to the 2010 United States Census, San Fernando had a median household income of $55,192, with 16.9% of the population living below the federal poverty line.

=== 2000 census ===
At the 2000 census there were 23,564 people in 5,774 households, including 4,832 families, in the city. The population density was 9,880.7 inhabitants per square mile (3,815.0/km^{2}). There were 5,932 housing units at an average density of 2,487.4 per square mile (960.4/km^{2}). The racial makeup of the city was 42.76% White, 0.98% African American, 1.69% Native American, 1.12% Asian, 0.11% Pacific Islander, 49.35% from other races, and 3.98% from two or more races. Hispanic or Latino of any race were 89.28%.

Of the 5,774 households 52.8% had children under the age of 18 living with them, 59.1% were married couples living together, 16.4% had a female householder with no husband present, and 16.3% were non-families. 12.4% of households were one person and 5.6% were one person aged 65 or older. The average household size was 4.07 and the average family size was 4.33.

The age distribution was 34.4% under the age of 18, 11.4% from 18 to 24, 32.1% from 25 to 44, 15.0% from 45 to 64, and 7.0% 65 or older. The median age was 27 years. For every 100 females, there were 101.7 males. For every 100 females age 18 and over, there were 99.9 males.

The median household income was $39,909 and the median family income was $40,138. Males had a median income of $26,068 versus $22,599 for females. The per capita income for the city was $11,485. 15.3% of families and 19.1% of the population were below the poverty line, including 22.5% of those under age 18 and 15.6% of those age 65 or over.

== Economy ==
=== Top employers ===
According to the City of San Fernando's 2022 annual report, the top ten employers in the city (not including the city itself as an employer) are:

#	Employer	# of Employees
1	Los Angeles Unified School District	2145
2	Pharmavite LLC	343
3	Pepsi Bottling Company	320
4	Home Depot	300
5	County of Los Angeles	250
6	PureTek	196
7	Production Resource Group LLC	151
8	Northeast Valley Health Group	150
9	Vallarta Supermarkets	144
10	Ricon Corp	118

As of 2021, the City of San Fernando has a total labor force of 11,000 with 3,943 (35.85%) working for the top ten employers listed. The City of San Fernando also employs 132 people as of 2021.

== Arts and culture ==
The city hosts public celebrations such as July 4 festivities and summer movie nights in city parks. Mexican-American culture is prevalent and the city hosts Día de los Muertos festivals and community classes teaching "Aztec" and Folklórico dances.

=== Sport ===
This city is home to an ulama team, Oceyolotl de San Fernando Valley, who play ulama de cadera in the AJUPEME USA league.

== Parks and recreation ==
The San Fernando Recreation and Community Services (RCS) Department maintains multiple parks and recreation centers in the city and provides residents with recreational amenities, programs and services. Various social clubs cater to senior residents providing them with crafting and gardening programs and social events.

List of city parks in San Fernando
Name	Address	Notes
Casa de López Adobe	1100 Pico Street	Small park on a historic site
César E. Chávez Memorial Park	Wolfskilll Street & Truman Street	Memorial park honoring César E. Chávez at an entrance to the city
Las Palmas Park	505 South Huntington Street	Neighborhood park with sports and recreational facilities
Layne Park	120 North Huntington Street	Small neighborhood park with recreational facilities
Pioneer Park	828 Harding Street	Neighborhood park with sports facilities
Rudy Ortega Sr. Park	2025 Fourth Street	Neighborhood park with walking trails and a tea house
San Fernando Recreation Park	208 Park Avenue	AKA San Fernando Regional Park; includes sports facilities and a recreation center
San Fernando Regional Pool	300 Park Avenue	Public pools adjacent to the San Fernando Recreation Park
Cindy Montañez Natural Park	801 8th Street	Formerly Pacoima Wash Natural Park; built by the MRCA with walking trails and a picnic area

== Government ==
=== Municipal government ===
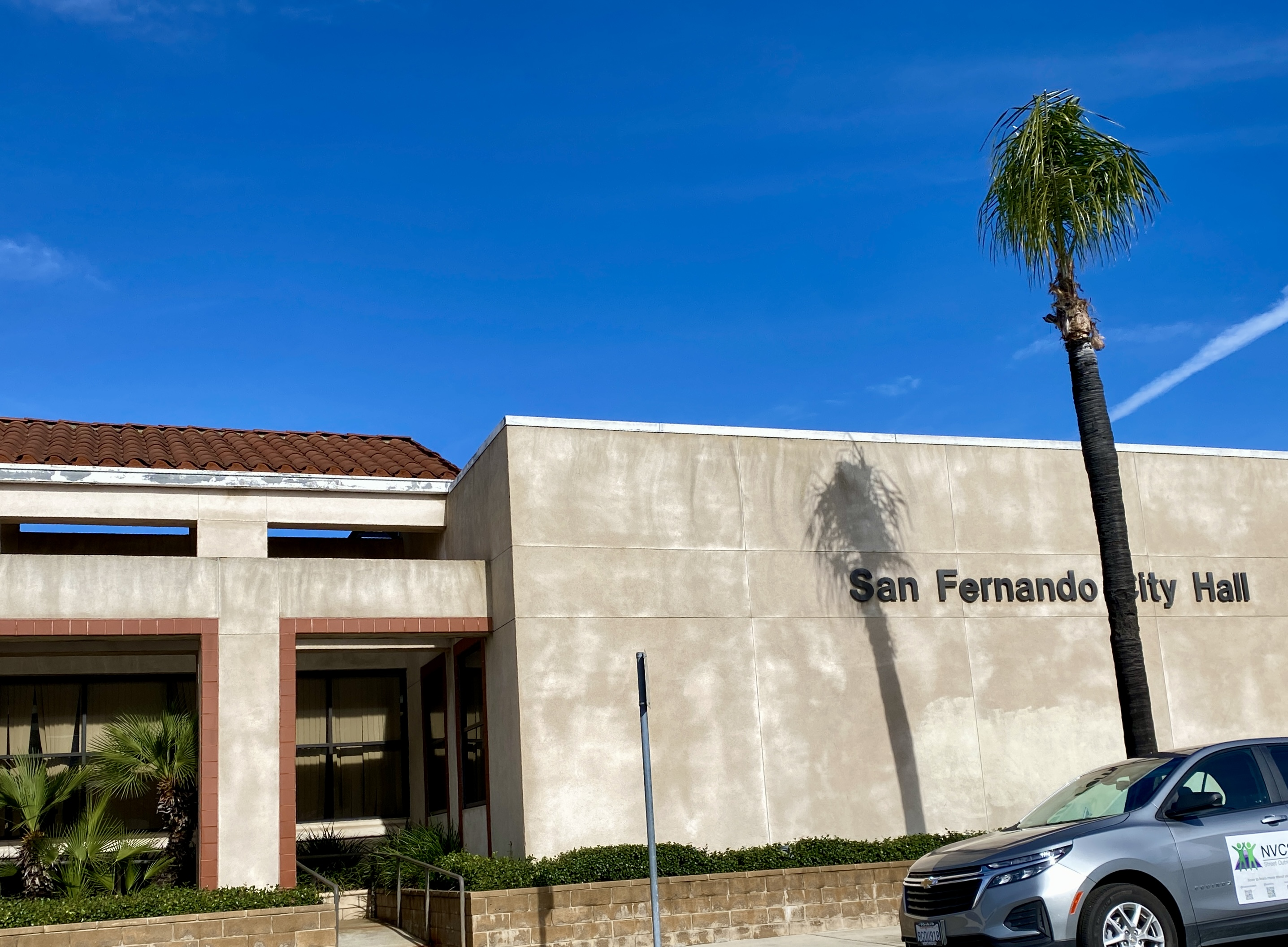
San Fernando City Hall

The City of San Fernando is governed by a city council. Members of the City Council are elected at-large and serve four year terms. The mayor is appointed every year, on a rotating basis, by a majority vote of the council. The Council meets on the first and third Monday of each month at 6:00 pm in the Council Chambers.

=== State and federal representation ===
In the California State Legislature, San Fernando is in the 20th senatorial district, represented by Democrat Caroline Menjivar, and in the 43rd Assembly district, represented by Democrat Celeste Rodriguez.

In the United States Senate, San Fernando is represented by California's senators Alex Padilla and Adam Schiff. In the United States House of Representatives, San Fernando is in California's 29th congressional district, represented by Democrat Luz Rivas.

== Education ==
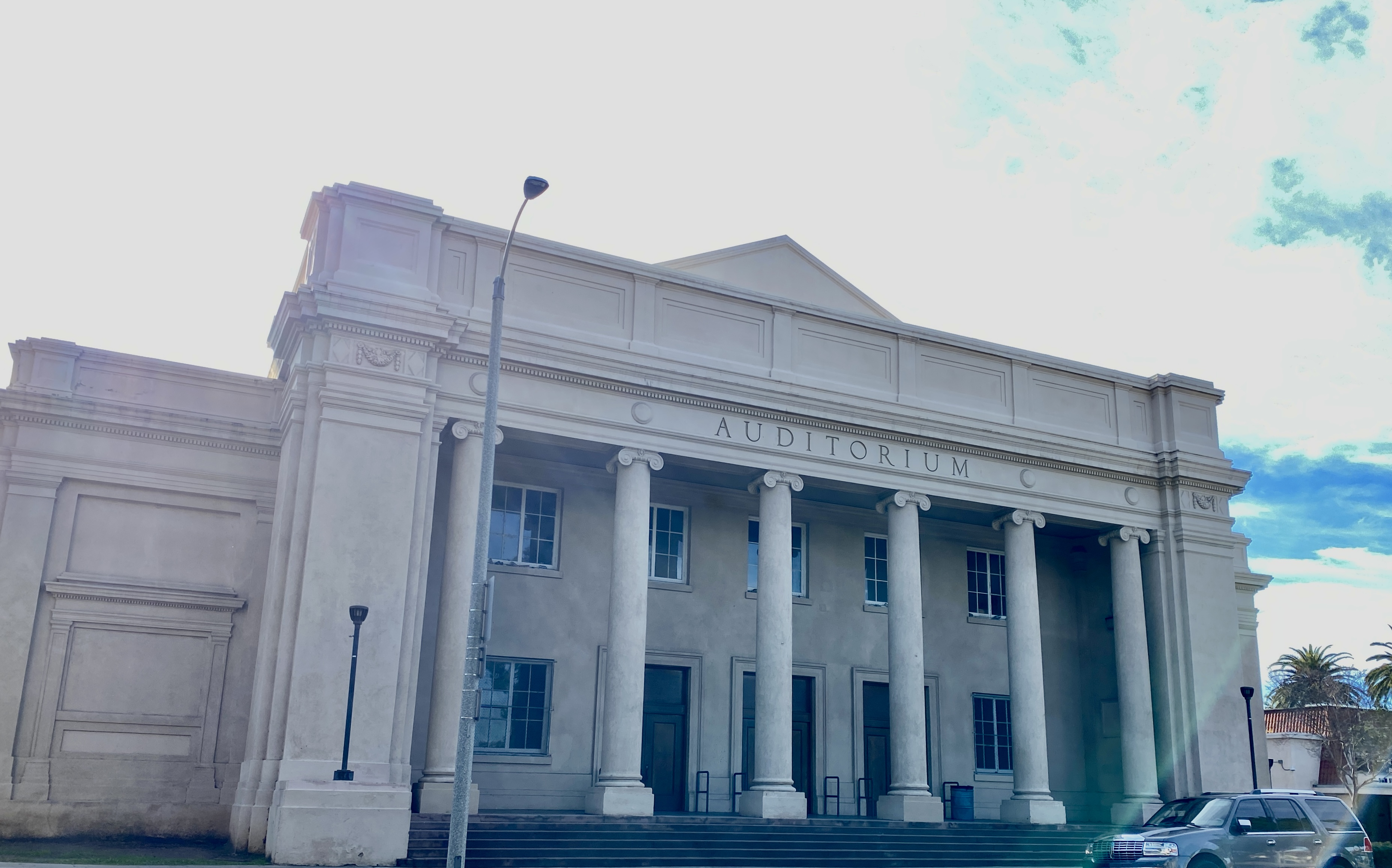
San Fernando Middle School Auditorium

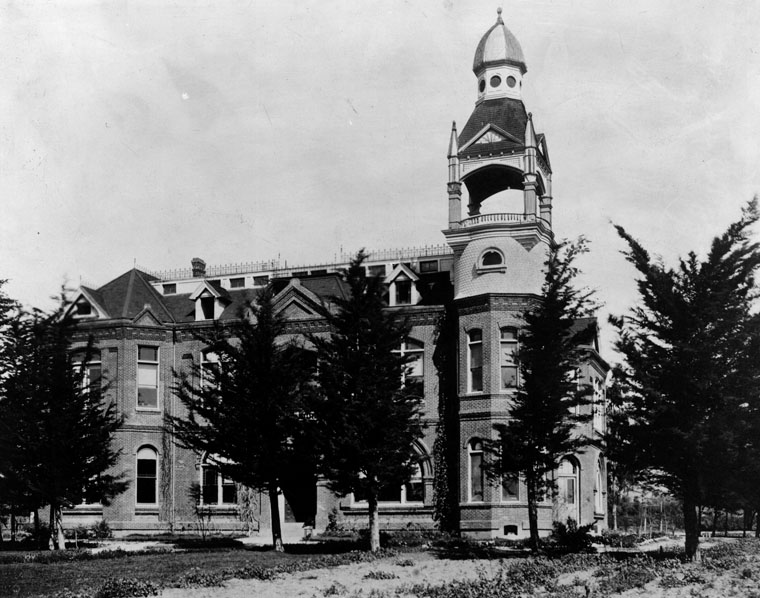
Maclay School of Theology, in San Fernando c. 1890.

San Fernando is served by the Los Angeles Unified School District.

San Fernando is served by the following LAUSD schools:

- O'Melveny Elementary School
- Morningside Elementary School
- San Fernando Elementary School
- Gridley Elementary School in nearby Sylmar
- San Fernando Middle School
- San Fernando institute for Applied Media
- César Chávez Learning Academies
- San Fernando High School
- Vaughn International Studies Academy (VISA); Charter School

The nearest community college to San Fernando is Los Angeles Mission College in the Sylmar neighborhood of Los Angeles.

PUC Schools operates some charter schools in San Fernando. They include Nueva Esperanza Charter Academy (MS and HS) and PUC Inspire Charter Academy. At one time Lakeview Charter Academy and Triumph Charter Academy, both of PUC Schools, were located in San Fernando now they are located in Sylmar.

A private school, The Concordia Schools San Fernando, was in the city. First Lutheran Schools was previously located where Concordia San Fernando was later now located. In 2011 the middle and high school consolidated into Concordia Junior Senior High School.

=== Public library ===
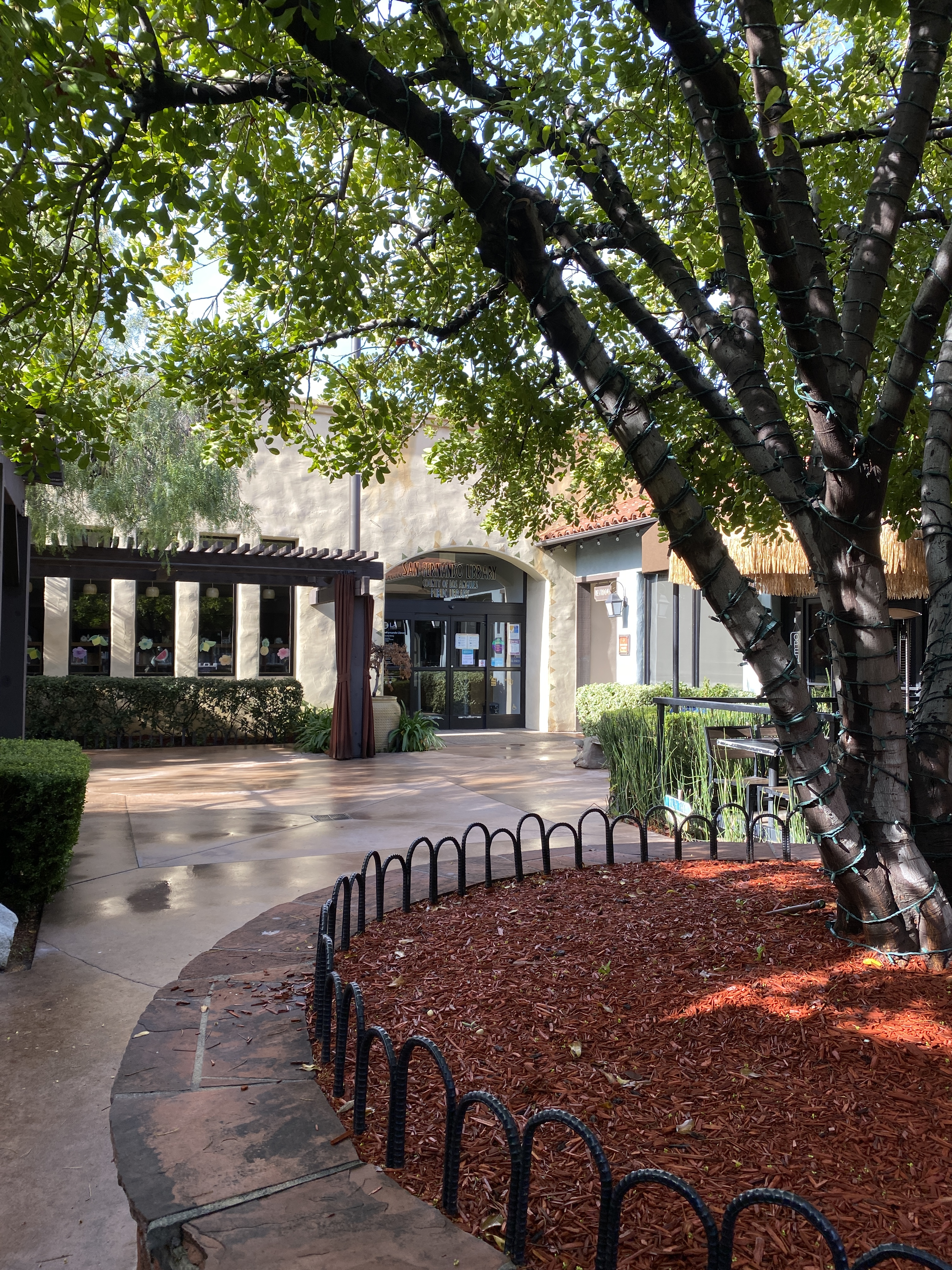
San Fernando branch

The County of Los Angeles Public Library operates the San Fernando Library at 217 North Maclay Avenue.

== Infrastructure ==
The Los Angeles County Department of Health Services operates the Pacoima Health Center in Pacoima in Los Angeles, serving the City of San Fernando.

The City of San Fernando produces, treats, sells and maintains its own water supply. The city began the construction of a $11.2 million rainwater infiltration system on the site of San Fernando Regional Park on April 4, 2022, which is meant to protect the Pacoima Wash and, in turn, Los Angeles River from further impurities and to support groundwater recharge for the San Fernando Valley Groundwater Basin, benefiting the city of Los Angeles. The new system also reduces the impact of heavy rain in the city, capturing runoff from a 940-acre (380 ha) drainage area including approximately 70% of the city's area. The project will be surfaced by a baseball field, as was originally on the site of the project.

The United States Postal Service operates the San Fernando Post Office.

=== Police ===
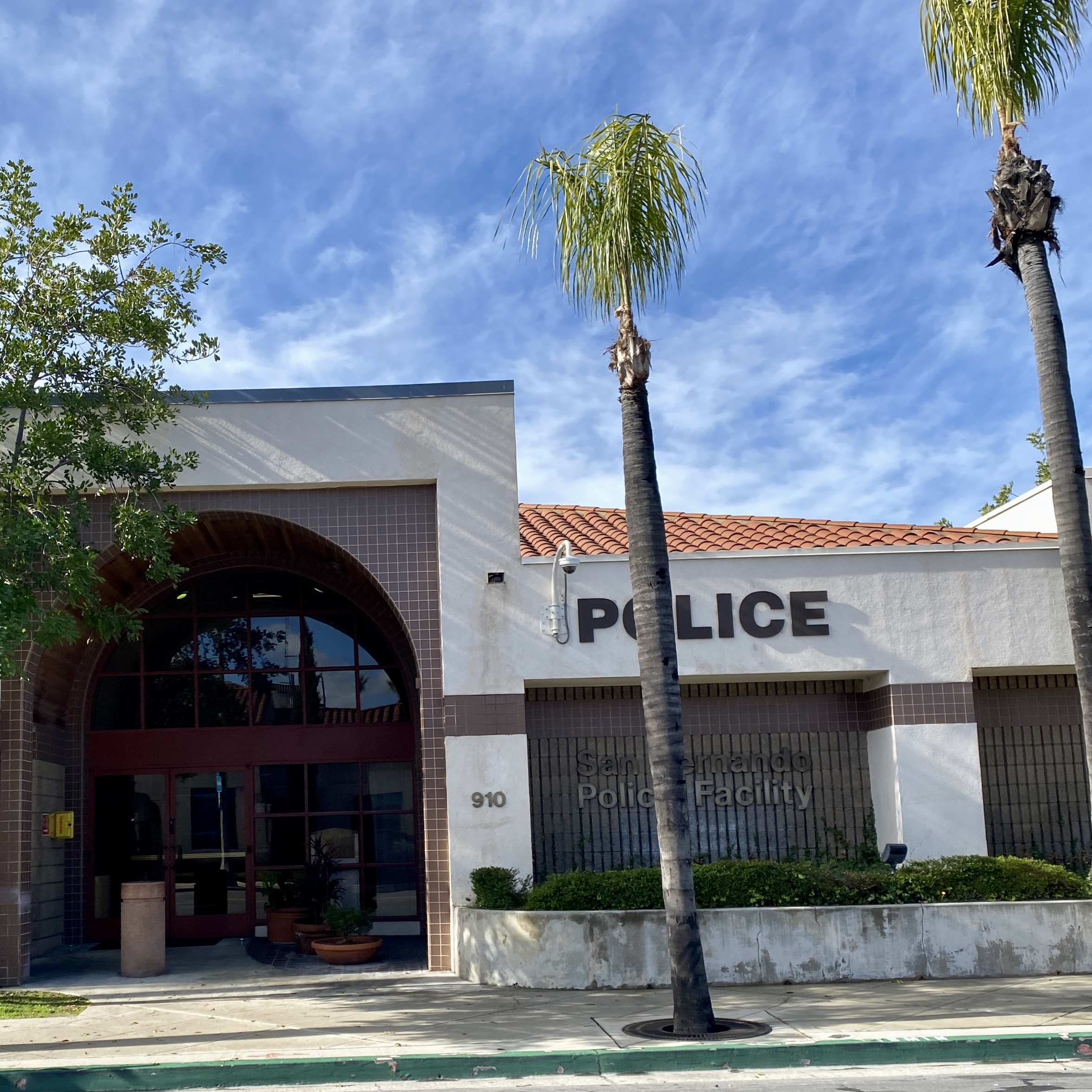
San Fernando Police Department

Police services in San Fernando is provided by the San Fernando Police Department. The police department has 35 sworn police officers and 25 non-sworn personnel. The department is also augmented by 20 sworn reserve police officers. In times of need, the police department can deploy a total of 55 sworn police officers.

The San Fernando Police Department is a member of the Los Angeles County Disaster Management Area "C". Area "C" consists of the cities of Burbank, Pasadena, Glendale, San Fernando, San Gabriel, Monterey Park, Alhambra and South Pasadena. The San Fernando Police have, in the past, requested mutual aid from the LAPD during major incidents.

=== Fire ===
The Los Angeles Fire Department provides fire protection services for the city of San Fernando, which serves the community from three nearby fire stations (Station 75, Station 91, and Station 98), all of which are located in the City of Los Angeles.

Fire Station 75 in Mission Hills serves western San Fernando. Fire Station 91 in Sylmar serves northeast San Fernando Fire Station 98 in Pacoima serves southeast San Fernando.

=== Transportation ===
The Sylmar/San Fernando Metrolink station serves the city on the Antelope Valley Line that passes through the city on a route adjacent to and parallel with San Fernando Boulevard. The officials and citizens have expressed their concern about the impact of the California High-Speed Rail if it follows the same route through the city. The city will become the future northern terminus of the East San Fernando Valley Light Rail Transit Project, the valley's first light rail line by 2027.

San Fernando runs a fixed route trolley service around the city, serving 28 stops around the city. At the moment, fares are free and the city claims a frequency of 20–25 minutes. The Los Angeles Metro, the county's transportation authority serves San Fernando with various Metro Local bus routes and the Metro Rapid 761 line, whose terminus is at the Metrolink station and ends in West Los Angeles.

== Notable people ==
- Paula Abdul, television personality
- David Wark Griffith, pioneer of silent motion pictures at his Griffith Ranch
- George Lopez, comedian, television actor, philanthropist
- Marlyn Mason, actress
- Rod McGaughy, actor and rodeo performer
- Don Prudhomme, NHRA drag racing driver
- Lalo García, Mexican-born artist, raised in San Fernando
