= Sylmar, Los Angeles =

Suburban neighborhood of Los Angeles, California

Sylmar
- Neighborhood of Los Angeles
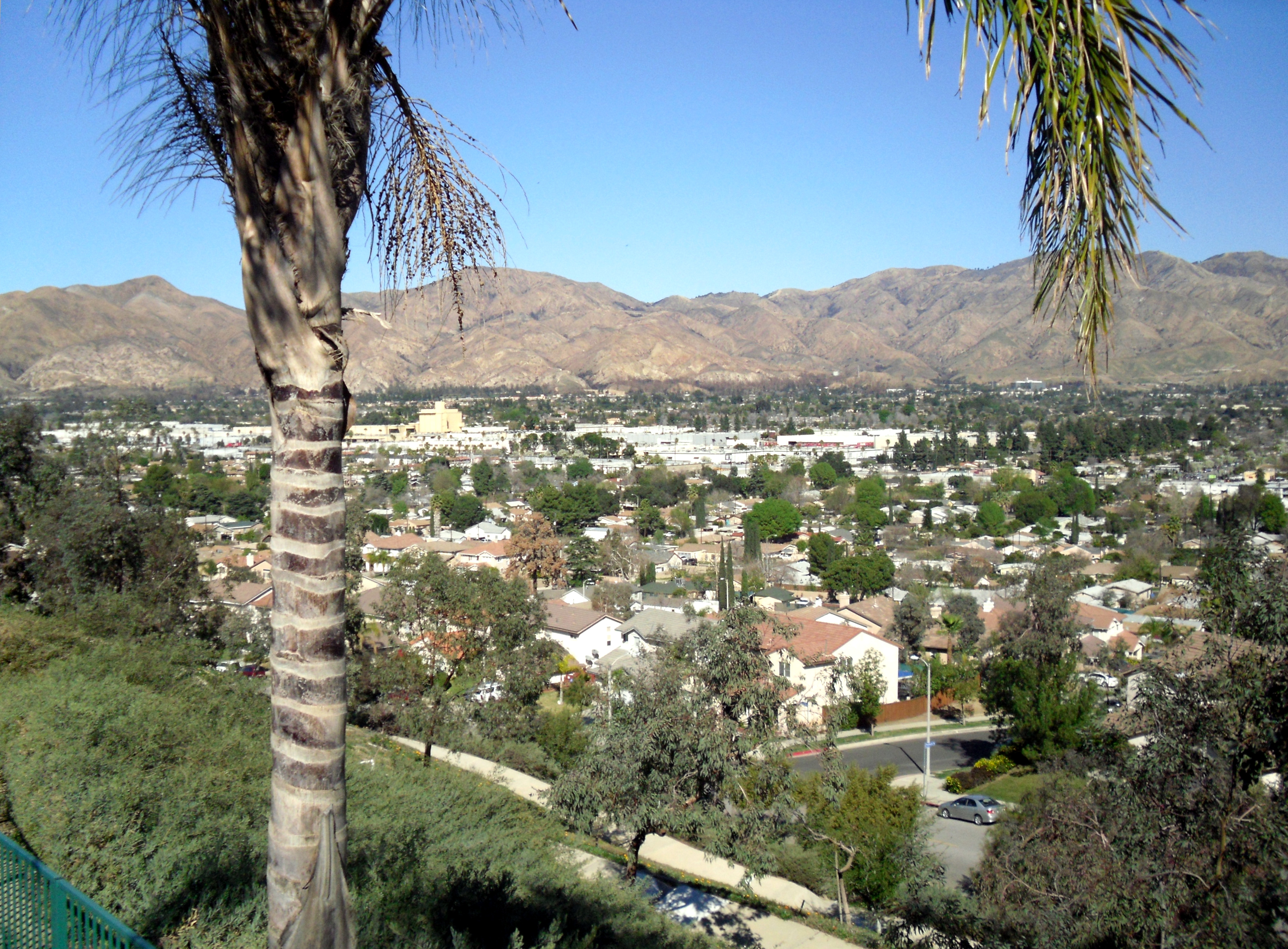
- View of western Sylmar, facing north
- Nickname: The Top of Los Angeles
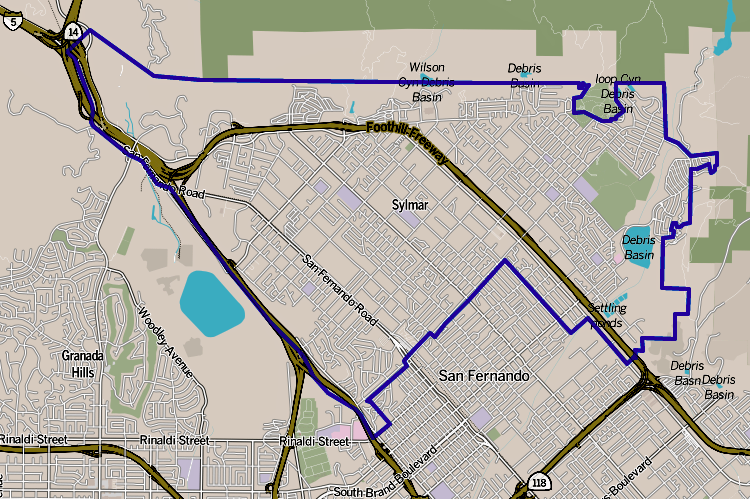
- Sylmar, as delineated by the Los Angeles Times

- Location within Los Angeles/San Fernando Valley Sylmar (the Los Angeles metropolitan area)
- Coordinates: 34.31°N 118.45°W
- Country: United States
- State: California
- County: Los Angeles
- City: Los Angeles
- Named for: portmanteau of silva and mare, Latin words meaning "forest" and "sea" respectively
- Elevation: 1,270 ft (390 m)

Population (2008)
  - Total: 79,614

Sylmar is a suburban neighborhood in the San Fernando Valley and the northernmost neighborhood within the city of Los Angeles, California, United States. Historically known for its profusion of sylvan olive orchards, Sylmar can trace this back to the 18th century and the founding of the San Fernando Mission. In 1890, olive production was begun systematically. The Sylmar climate was also considered healthy, and so a sanitarium was established, the first in a series of hospitals in the neighborhood. There are fourteen public and eight private schools within Sylmar.

== History ==
In 1874, the settlement was named Morningside. The foothills of the San Gabriel Mountains were transformed in the late 1890s by the Los Angeles Olive Growers Association. In 1893, the name changed to "Sylmar", a fusion of two Latin words for "forest" and "sea" in reference to the large number of olive trees that covered the area. In 1894, up to 1,700 acres (690 ha) were planted with olives trees, and by 1906, the property had become the largest olive grove in the world. During the picking season in the early 1900s, 300 Japanese were employed and housed in a village of tents. In 1927, the packing plant employed some five hundred workers during its busiest season.

The plan of the Olive Growers association in 1898 was to divide the area into 40-acre (16 ha) blocks bounded by "broad drives," and within them 5-acre (2.0 ha) blocks would be laid out, "each one of which is upon a street." About a hundred trees would be planted on each acre. Half of these lands were placed on the market in 1897–98 at $350 an acre (0.4 ha), with a minimum purchase of five acres. The terms were $350 in cash and $350 a year until paid for. The Olive Growers group would take care of the groves and, "When the premises are turned over to the purchaser at the end of four years, it is an established, profit-yielding property, without incumbrance." There is no record as to the results of this plan.

In 1922 the Taft Realty Company of Hollywood purchased 300 acres (120 hectares) from Ben F. Porter and divided them into tracts containing 1–15 acres (0.40–6.07 ha) each, which it planned to make into a townsite called Sylmar. Part of the acreage contained orange and lemon trees, and the rest had been used by the Ryan Wholesale and Produce Company for garden and truck farming. The land lay directly across the San Fernando Boulevard from the Sylmar olive grove and packing plant. A later advertisement stated the name of the subdivision as "Sylmar Acres," with "city lots" selling for $450 to $550.

The property of the Sylmar Packing Corporation, with frontage of more than 4.5 miles (7.2 km) on Foothill Boulevard, was offered for sale in October 1938. At that time it was planted in olives, lemons, oranges and figs. A 40-acre (16 ha) section was to be set aside for a new townsite called Olive View and the rest subdivided into 5- and 10-acre (2- and 4-ha) farm lots, with many streets already paved and public utilities installed. In the same month, manufacturer and landowner John R. Stetson announced his 200-acre (81 ha) property adjoining the Sylmar ranch would also be divided and offered for sale.

=== Postwar ===
A May 1962 proposal by the city Planning Department for an increase in density was met with disapproval by residents at a community meeting. The city's master plan for the area called for much of the agricultural land to be converted to suburban uses, plus zoning that would permit more apartments. There would also be expansion of industrial districts and more shopping centers. The plan proposed that the 4,500 acres then zoned for agriculture be reduced to 2,000, or 17% of the area. City officials said that Sylmar had been the slowest of all San Fernando Valley communities to develop its multiple dwelling areas, with permits issued for only 35 units in 1961 and 70 units in 1962.

Sylmar's major growth came after the 1963 completion of the interchange between the Golden State Freeway and San Diego Freeway and the 1981 completion of the Foothill Freeway and 118 Freeway, which made the community easier to reach. The 1971 San Fernando earthquake caused widespread injury and damage. The New York Times described two weeks later:

The community looks like a battlefield. Dozens of houses are twisted beyond repair. Families camp out in tents or trailers on front lawns, afraid to return even to those houses not condemned ... All homes have been without water for drinking, cooking and flushing toilets, although some service has been restored in the last few days. There is no gas, no heat. Telephones are still out. Housewives must travel out of the community to find grocery stores that are still open. On top of that, Sylmar feels that it has been forgotten ...

In March 1969, the Metropolitan Water District of Southern California awarded an over $19 million contract to the Lockheed Shipbuilding and Construction Company to construct the San Fernando Tunnel. The water tunnel extended through Sylmar and was meant to be part of the Foothill Feeder pipeline which distributes water from Northern California to the MWD's member agencies serving a 4790-square-mile area. In June 24, 1971, four months after the 1971 earthquake, a methane gas explosion in a water tunnel being drilled beneath Sylmar killed 17 workers and is the worst tunneling disaster in California history. Criminal action was taken against Lockheed, which was charged with negligence and safety violations. Following a trial that lasted just over a year, the contractor was found guilty of 16 counts of gross negligence and 10 counts of violations of the state industrial safety code. Lockheed was fined nearly $10 million, and two field supervisors were found guilty of negligence; in addition, the families of the deceased employees sued for damages, resulting in an approximately $9 million settlement. The disaster resulted in the state adopting the toughest mining and tunneling regulations in the United States. Work resumed 27 months after the disaster, and agreements on procedures and costs were made between the MWD and Lockheed were worked out; the tunnel was completed in November 1975. A memorial for the victims was erected in 2013. Cal/OSHA.

In 1971 city planners presented a land-use document that would preserve Sylmar's image as one of "houses, horses and orchards" and would roll back the then-existing projection from 90,000 residents by 1990 to 53,500.

A proposal in 1980 to build an 80-unit low-income housing project near Sylmar High School at 13080-90 Dronfield Avenue was rejected by the Los Angeles City Housing Commission after eight thousand signatures were gathered against the plan and protesters filled a hearing in the high school auditorium.

In 1984 Sylmar was still largely rural, but there was an area of industrial development in its southeastern portion. In 1986, when its population was given 53,392, it still had some of the last large tracts of undeveloped land in the city, and the opening of the Foothill Freeway had placed it within a 45-minute drive of Downtown Los Angeles. Despite the population increase and a rise in the number of people living in condos and apartments, it was still one of the least-crowded areas of the city. Between 1980 and 1990 it was the fastest-growing area in the San Fernando Valley: Its population increased by 30.7% during those ten years in which the Valley itself grew by only 12.2%.

Reopening of the Olive View Medical Center in 1986 was seen as an impetus to population and business growth, as well as a threat to the horse-owning community. Practically every corner on Foothill Boulevard had been purchased for development. The population reached 53,392 in 1986.

Sylmar was impacted by the 1994 Northridge earthquake. It caused fires that burned over 70 homes. Sylmar was nicknamed "The Top of Los Angeles," because it is the northernmost neighborhood in Los Angeles.

A study by four graduate students from the University of Southern California in 2005 stated that:

Sylmar in the 1970s and 1980s was a rural, predominantly white, non-Hispanic community, whose residents focused on creating a place centered around equestrian activities. Today, the dramatic influx of residents has serious consequences for a community that has too little housing stock, too few employment opportunities, overburdened public facilities and decaying public infrastructure.

By 2006 Sylmar's open spaces were being rapidly subdivided. Resident Bart Reed noted that Sylmar was the last place in Los Angeles "where a builder can find a single-family home on half an acre. They can tear them down and build 52 homes" in their place. Longtime residents were concerned that the expansion would threaten their equestrian lifestyle in a community that still retained a largely rural atmosphere with corrals on large lots and horse trails that wound into the nearby San Gabriel Mountains.

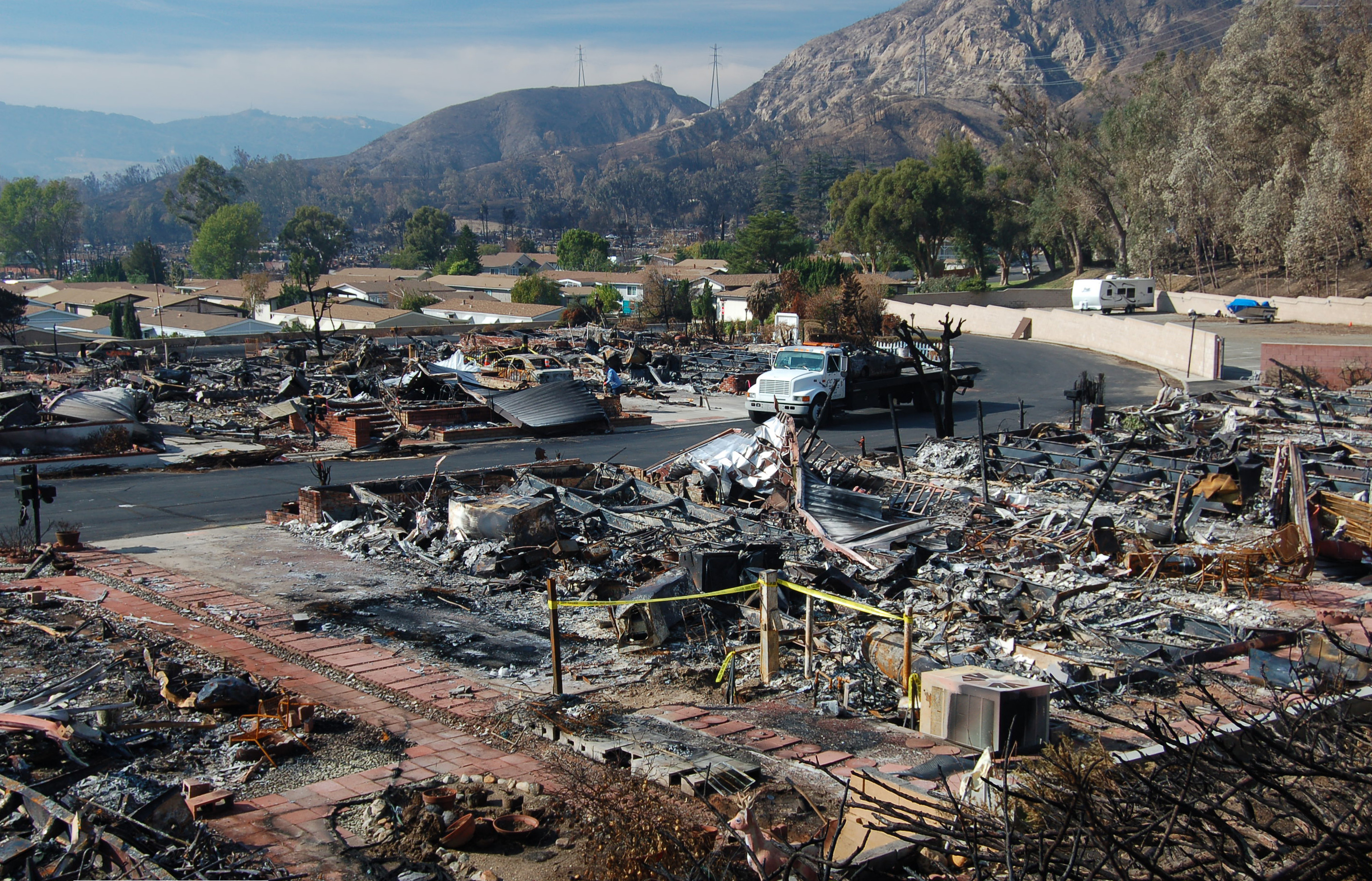
The remains of the Oakridge mobile home park in Sylmar after the 2008 Sayre Fire.

The Sayre Fire in 2008 resulted in the loss of 489 residences in or near Sylmar, the "worst loss of homes due to fire" in Los Angeles's history. In 2016 the Marek Fire destroyed 41 homes.

In 2018, the northwest portion of the district was called "Rancho Cascades".

On January 7, 2025, the Hurst Fire broke out near Sylmar, causing mass amounts of smoke and ashes to nearby Sylmar areas.

=== Crime ===
==== Drugs ====
Tipped off by a Sylmar resident, dozens of investigators from at least five police departments and three federal agencies raided a warehouse at 12898 Bradley Street, on September 29, 1989, and seized some 21.4 tons of cocaine and $10 million in cash. It was the largest confiscation of the drug in history, estimated at $6.9 billion, enough for 1.38 billion doses. Three men were convicted on drug charges in 1990. Carlos Tapia Ponce, the warehouse manager, was given a life term, and in 2016 he died in prison at the age of 94. Other culprits were convicted later.

==== Drag races and automobile cruising ====
In 1993 it was reported that drag racing had been going on since the early 1970s, drawing hundreds of youths, and that the most popular "speed strip" was San Fernando Road near Balboa Boulevard. There had been four deaths within the previous two years. In one, a teenager speeding to the site rear-ended a car carrying a family of four, killing a mother and injuring her husband and two children. In 1997 Kenneth Acosta, 21, of Sylmar was charged with involuntary manslaughter after a drag race on the 118 Freeway resulted in an accident that caused the deaths of three people, all of them former members of the Sylmar High School band. He was granted probation and required to spend 250 hours talking to others about his crime.

In 1994, city officials declared one of the most popular cruising spots in the San Fernando Valley — La Rinda Plaza at Laurel Canyon Boulevard and Workman Street — to be a public nuisance and ordered its owners to install overhead lighting, post security guards and install gates that could be closed at night. Illegal street racing or high-speed figure 8's were frequently heard by residents near the Sylmar Public Library.

== Geography ==
Sylmar gently slopes upward as a geological alluvial plain and alluvial fan from an elevation of slightly more than 1,100 feet (340 m) above sea level near San Fernando Road to slightly more than 1,700 feet (520 m) above sea level at the crest of Hubbard Street. The overall range of elevation in Sylmar is approximately 600 feet (180 m). The slopes steepen into the San Gabriel Mountains on the north side of Sylmar resulting in steep residential streets with homes built on man-made terraces.

Sylmar touches the unincorporated Tujunga Canyons on the north, Lopez and Kagel canyons on the east, San Fernando on the southeast, Mission Hills on the south, and Granada Hills on the southwest and west.

=== Climate ===
The Valley shares the Los Angeles Basin's dry, sunny weather, with only 17 inches (430 mm) annual precipitation on average. Snow in the San Fernando Valley is extremely rare, though the neighboring Angeles National Forest is capped with snow every winter.

Although Sylmar is only 20 miles (32 km) from the Pacific Ocean, the Valley can be considerably hotter than the Los Angeles Basin during the summer months and cooler during the winter months. The average high temperature in summer is 95 °F (35 °C), dropping down to 68 °F (20 °C). In winter, the average high is 66 °F (19 °C) and average low is 40 °F (4 °C).

Climate data for Sylmar, Los Angeles
Month	Jan	Feb	Mar	Apr	May	Jun	Jul	Aug	Sep	Oct	Nov	Dec	Year
Mean daily maximum °F (°C)	65 (18)	67 (19)	69 (21)	74 (23)	78 (26)	85 (29)	92 (33)	93 (34)	87 (31)	80 (27)	71 (22)	65 (18)	77 (25)
Mean daily minimum °F (°C)	43 (6)	43 (6)	44 (7)	46 (8)	50 (10)	55 (13)	59 (15)	60 (16)	58 (14)	52 (11)	46 (8)	42 (6)	50 (10)
Average precipitation inches (mm)	4.44 (113)	4.60 (117)	4.17 (106)	1.08 (27)	0.49 (12)	0.13 (3.3)	0.03 (0.76)	0.21 (5.3)	0.40 (10)	0.66 (17)	1.52 (39)	2.43 (62)	20.16 (512)

== Demographics ==
The population of the Sylmar area was roughly 3,500 in 1940, 10,000 in 1950, 31,000 in 1962, 40,000 in 1972, 41,922 in 1980 and 53,392 in 1986. By 2000, a "wave of immigrants and working poor" had enveloped Sylmar, Pacoima, Arleta and Sun Valley, resulting in a housing shortage for lower-income people. The 2000 U.S. census counted 69,499 residents in the 12.46-square-mile Sylmar neighborhood—or 5,579 people per square mile, among the lowest population densities for the city. In 2008, the city estimated that the population had increased to 79,614. The City of Los Angeles Department of City Planning released that the 2021 population was 80,155.

In 1980, Sylmar was predominantly white, the ethnic breakdown being 58% white and 36% Latino. Twenty years later, in 2000, the neighborhood was considered "moderately diverse" ethnically within Los Angeles, with a relatively high percentage of Latinos. The breakdown in 2000 was Latinos, 69.8%; whites, 20.7%; blacks, 4.1%; Asians, 3.4%, and others, 2.0%. Mexico (71.7%) and El Salvador (8.4%) were the most common places of birth for the 36.7% of the residents who were born abroad, an average figure for Los Angeles. Mexican (57.8%) and German (3.2%) were the most common ancestries. In 2000 the median age for residents was 28, considered young for city and county neighborhoods.

In 2000, renters occupied 29.2% of the housing stock, and house- or apartment-owners held 70.8%. The average household size of 3.6 people was considered high for Los Angeles. The percentage of married women (55.5%) was among the county's highest. There were 3,607 veterans, or 7.7% of the population, average for the city of Los Angeles and the county.

The median yearly household income in 2008 dollars was $65,783, considered average for the city.

== Arts and culture ==
Sylmar is home to the Nethercutt Collection, a museum best known for its collection of classic automobiles. The Nethercutt museum also houses collections of mechanical musical instruments, including orchestrions, player pianos and music boxes, antique furniture, and a historical locomotive and train car.

=== Historical landmarks ===
- A channel, or spillway, called the Cascades marks the terminus of the Los Angeles Aqueduct system, which brings water 338 miles (544 km) from the Owens Valley to the Van Norman Reservoir in Granada Hills. The channel is a Los Angeles Historic-Cultural Monument No. 742 and California Historical Landmark No. 653. It is also on the list of Historic Civil Engineering Landmarks.
- The San Fernando Pioneer Memorial Cemetery at 14400 Foothill Boulevard is the oldest nonsectarian cemetery in the San Fernando Valley, with the first burial recorded in 1892. It was listed as a Los Angeles Historic-Cultural Monument in 1993. As San Fernando Cemetery, it is a California Historical Landmark.

=== Public libraries ===
Los Angeles Public Library operates the Sylmar Branch Library on the corner of Polk Street and Glenoaks Boulevard.

== Parks and recreation ==
The City of Los Angeles Sylmar Recreation Center, which also functions as a Los Angeles Police Department stop-in center, includes auditoriums, a lighted baseball diamond, lighted outdoor basketball courts, a children's play area, a community room, an indoor gymnasium without weights, picnic tables, an unlighted soccer field, and lighted tennis courts. The city also operates the Stetson Ranch Park., one of the city's two equestrian parks.

Los Angeles County operates the 79-acre (32 ha) El Cariso Community Regional Park, which was dedicated to the twelve fallen firefighters and survivors, members of the El Cariso Hotshots, an interagency hotshot crew in the Loop Fire in 1966. The park has a lighted ball diamond, a basketball court, tennis courts, children's play areas, a community building, horseshoe pits, an indoor kitchen, picnic areas for large groups, picnic tables and shelters, and a swimming pool.

In addition the county operates the 96.5-acre (39.1 ha) Veterans Memorial Park in an area adjacent to and outside of the Los Angeles City limits. The site of the park was the site of a veterans hospital that was built in the 1920s and closed in 1971 due to an earthquake that killed many veterans and employees at the hospital. The park, which was dedicated in 1979, has barbecue braziers, group camping areas, a community building, a disc golf course, picnic areas, a picnic pavilion, and toilets.

The Sylmar Hang Gliding Association operates their Sylmar Flight Park on Gridley Street near Simshaw Ave. Visitors can watch the activities most afternoons.

== Government ==
=== Local government ===
In 1943 Sylmar volunteers, with cooperation from the city fire department, established their own branch station at 15097 Roxford Street, principally because Sylmar at that time was separated from other stations by railroad tracks.

Today, the Los Angeles Fire Department operates Fire Station 91 in Sylmar. The Los Angeles Police Department operates the Mission Community Police Station in Mission Hills, serving Sylmar.

=== Federal representation ===
- Sylmar is represented in the United States Senate by California's Senators Adam Schiff and Alex Padilla.
- Sylmar is located within California's 29th congressional district represented by Democrat Luz Rivas.

=== State representation ===
Sylmar is located within California's 43rd State Assembly district represented by Democrat Celeste Rodriguez and California's 20th State Senate district represented by Democrat Caroline Menjivar.

=== Local representation ===
Sylmar is located within Los Angeles City Council District 7 represented by Monica Rodriguez.

== Education ==
Eleven percent of Sylmar residents aged 25 and older had earned a four-year degree by 2000, one of the lowest percentages for the city and the county.

=== Schools ===
Schools within the Sylmar boundaries are:

==== Public ====
- Los Angeles Mission College, 13356 Eldrige Avenue
- Sylmar Senior High School, 13050 Borden Avenue (opened in 1961)
- PUC Triumph Charter High School, 13361 Glenoaks Boulevard
- Evergreen Continuation School, 13101 Dronfield Avenue
- Olive Vista Middle School, 14600 Tyler Street (opened in 1958)
- PUC Triumph Academy, charter middle school, 13361 Glenoaks Blvd.
- PUC Lakeview Charter High School, 13361 Glenoaks Boulevard
- PUC Community Charter Elementary School, 14019 Sayre Street
- Hubbard Street Elementary School, 13325 Hubbard Street
- Barry J. Nidorf Juvenile Hall, 16350 Filbert Street
- Herrick Avenue Elementary School, 13350 Herrick Avenue
- Sylmar Elementary School, 13291 Phillippi Avenue (opened in 1946)
- Harding Street Elementary School, 13060 Harding Street
- El Dorado Avenue Elementary School, 12749 El Dorado Avenue
- Dyer Street Elementary School, 14500 Dyer Street
- Osceola Street Elementary School, 14940 Osceola Street
- Vista del Valle Dual Language Academy, 12441 Bromont Avenue
- Sylmar Biotech Health Academy, 13050 Borden Avenue (est. 2012)
- Options for Youth (OFY), 13752 Foothill Blvd
- Discovery Charter Preparatory School, 13570 Eldridge Avenue (moved here in 2016)

==== Private ====
- First Lutheran High School, 13361 Glenoaks Boulevard
- Concordia Junior-Senior High School, 13570 Eldridge Avenue. The school was formed by the merger of Los Angeles Lutheran High School and First Lutheran San Fernando. As of 2011 it had 260 students, making it the largest of the campuses of the system. Los Angeles Lutheran was located where Concordia Junior Senior High was later established. It closed in 2016.
- St. Anne's Academy, 13982 Tucker Avenue
- Our Lady of Victory School, K–12, 14024 Bridle Ridge Road
- Sunland Christian School, K–12, 13216 Leach Street
- Poverello of Assisi Preschool, 13367 Borden Avenue
- Park Montessori Children's Center, 13130 Herrick Avenue
- St. Didacus Elementary School, 14325 Astoria Street

== Infrastructure ==
=== Police ===
Sylmar is serviced by the Mission Community Police Station of the Los Angeles Police Department.

=== Healthcare ===
Olive View–UCLA Medical Center is located in Sylmar. The hospital was first opened as a sanatorium.

=== El Retiro School for Girls ===
El Retiro School for Girls was a boarding school for girls who had been made wards of the Los Angeles County court system. It opened in 1919 and closed in 1961.

=== Juvenile hall ===
A branch juvenile hall opened in Sylmar in 1965. Several residents opposed the plan.

=== Highways ===
The community of Sylmar is serviced by the Golden State Freeway (Interstate 5), Foothill Freeway (Interstate 210), and San Diego Freeway (Interstate 405).

=== Public transportation ===
Public transportation is provided by Los Angeles County Metropolitan Transportation Authority for bus services and Metrolink for commuter rail service on the Antelope Valley Line at the Sylmar/San Fernando station. Other buses in Sylmar include Metro Rapid, Los Angeles Metro Bus, and Los Angeles Department of Transportation buses.

== Notable people ==
- Mack Ray Edwards (1918–1971), child sex abuser/serial killer; died from suicide by hanging in his prison cell
- Mark Foster, lead singer and founding member of Foster the People
- Tor Johnson (1902–1971), Swedish-American wrestler and actor.
- Alex Mejia, professional baseball player (born in Sylmar)
- Pete Redfern, professional baseball player
- Bobby Chacon (1951–2016), professional boxer, 2 time boxing Champion; Inducted into IBHOF in 2005

== See also ==
- Pacific Converter station (electrical)
