= Little Mountain Fire =

Little Mountain Fire may refer to:

- Little Mountain Fire, an October 2007 wildfire in San Bernardino County, California
- Little Mountain Fire (2017), a December 2017 wildfire in San Bernardino County, California
