= 2018 Southern California mudflows =

Natural disaster

2018 Southern California debris flows
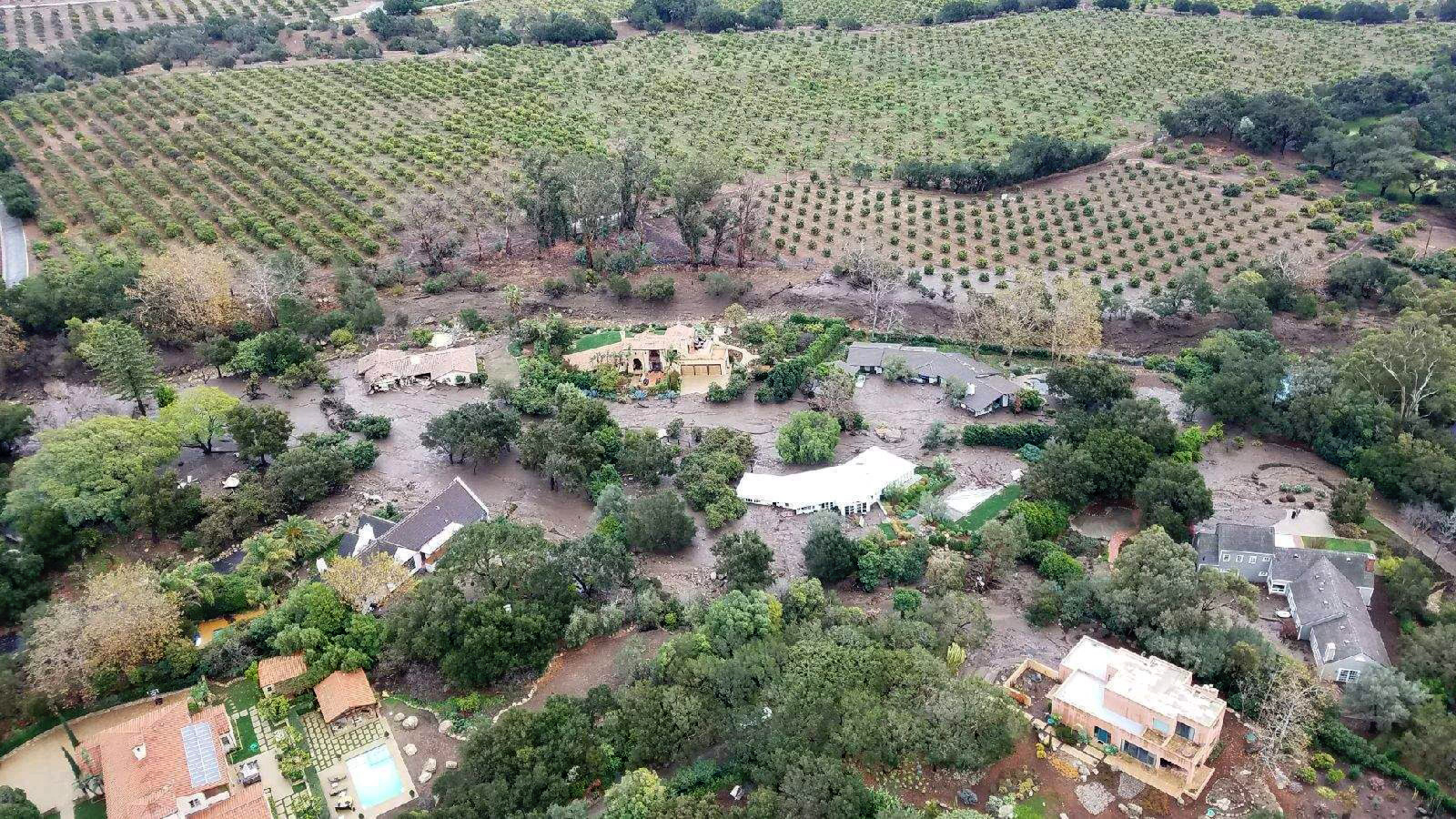
- Homes and streets of a neighborhood affected by the Santa Barbara County mudslides
- Date: January 9, 2018
- Location: Southern California, United States
- Cause: Soil saturation from heavy rainfall, and deforestation due to recent wildfires
- Deaths: 23
- Injuries: 163
- Property damage: >$207 million (2018 USD): 65 residences destroyed, 462 residences damaged, 8 commercial buildings destroyed, 20 commercial buildings damaged

A series of mudflows occurred in Southern California in early January 2018, particularly affecting areas northwest of Montecito in Santa Barbara County. The incident was responsible for 23 deaths, although the body of one of the victims has never been found. Approximately 163 people were hospitalized with various injuries, including four in critical condition. The disaster occurred one month after a series of major wildfires. The conflagrations devastated steep slopes, which caused loss of vegetation and destabilization of the soil and greatly facilitated subsequent mudflows. The mudflows caused at least $177 million (2018 USD) in property damage, and cost at least $7 million in emergency responses and another $43 million (2018 USD) to clean up.

== Background ==
The 2017 California wildfire season was at the time the most destructive in California's history, with approximately 9,133 wildfires that burned over 1.3 million acres (5,300 km^{2}) and killed 46 people. At the beginning of December, the Santa Ana winds fanned wildfires across southern California, which were fueled by a lack of rainfall during what is normally the region's rainy season. The December fires burned 307,953 acres (124,624 ha) of which 281,893 acres (114,078 ha) were burned during the Thomas Fire, the largest fire in the state's history at the time. The Thomas Fire, which devastated parts of Santa Barbara and Ventura counties, burned large amounts of vegetation whose roots had helped stabilize topsoil in hillsides and other vulnerable areas. After burning for more than a month, the fire was declared fully contained on January 12, 2018.

A strong low-pressure system and cold front developed off the coast of California on January 5, 2018. The system moved onto the mainland on January 8, bringing heavy rain to Southern California and prompting mandatory evacuations in parts of Los Angeles, Santa Barbara, and Ventura counties, over potential mudslides in areas affected by wildfires. The storm intensified on the following day, with at least four inches (100 mm) of rain falling over the two-day period, before ending on January 9, causing several major mudflows.

== Landslides ==
=== Santa Barbara County ===
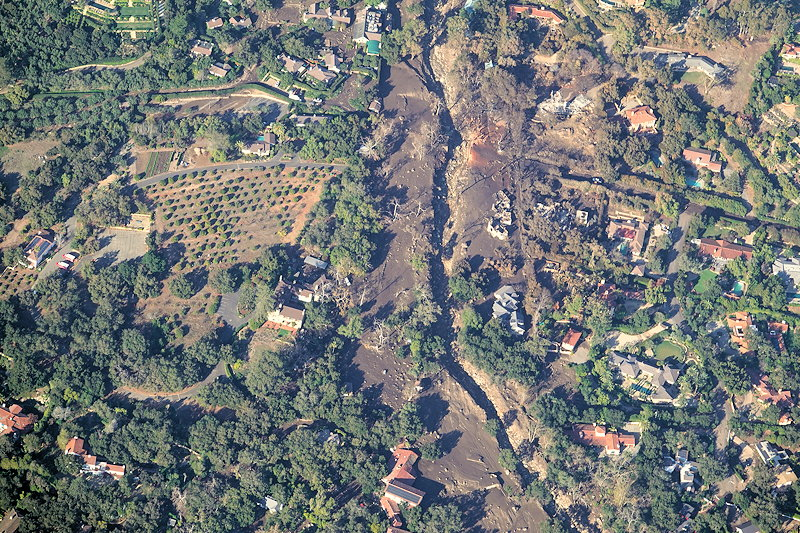
San Ysidro Ck. after debris flow

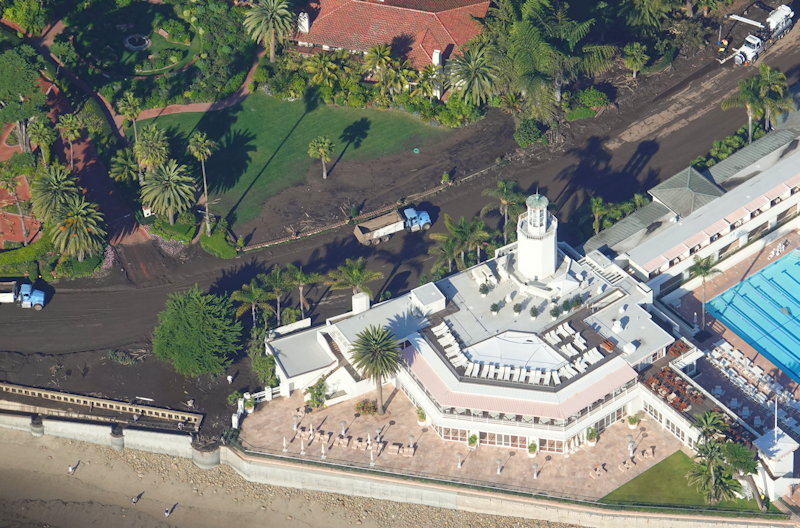
Butterfly Beach debris

Early on the morning of January 9, mudflows struck Montecito, which had been affected by the Thomas Fire, and other areas of Santa Barbara County. An estimated 0.5 inches (13 mm) of rain fell within a five-minute period at approximately 3:30 a.m., causing mud and boulders from the Santa Ynez Mountains to flow down creeks and valleys into Montecito. The debris flows were up to 15 feet (5 m) in height of mud, boulders and tree branches, moving at estimated speeds of up to 20 miles per hour (30 km/h) into the lower areas of Montecito. Over 20,000 people lost power, and a 30-mile (50 km) section of U.S. Route 101 (US 101) from Santa Barbara to Ventura was shut down as sections filled with two feet (60 cm) of mud and debris, some of which also reached beaches 2.25 miles (3.6 km) from the mountains. Following the closure, access to Santa Barbara from the Los Angeles area was limited to a 260-mile (420 km) detour around the Los Padres National Forest or through the use of private ferries to Ventura. On January 11, Amtrak train service was restored to Santa Barbara and US 101 was partially reopened as far west as Carpinteria. The highway was fully reopened on January 21, after Caltrans crews cleared 12 feet (3.7 m) of mud from the roadway.

Approximately 21,000 residents of Santa Barbara and Ventura counties in high elevation zones affected by the Thomas Fire were evacuated, but low-lying areas were outside of the mandatory evacuation area. Warning messages sent by the National Weather Service and the county government arrived too late to prompt Montecito residents to seek safe areas. Many residents in the mandatory evacuation zone, and most residents in the voluntary evacuation area, ignored warnings and stayed in their homes, probably a result of "evacuation fatigue" left over from the recent wildfires. The mandatory evacuation zone was expanded to cover a majority of Montecito's estimated 10,000 residents two days later (January 11) due to disruptions in electricity, gas, water, sewage and Internet, and due to emergency road works and ongoing search and rescue operations.

The mudflows caused 23 confirmed deaths, mostly in the Montecito area. One body, that of two-year-old Lydia Sutthithepa, was never recovered. Over 150 people were hospitalized with various injuries, including four in critical condition. The mudflows destroyed over 100 homes and damaged an additional 300. Writer T.C. Boyle, whose home was proximate to both the fire and mudslides, documented the collective trauma in The New Yorker magazine.

Cleanup efforts began a week after the initial mudflows, with debris being sent to the Ventura County Fairgrounds for sorting and the Calabasas Landfill for disposal.

=== Los Angeles County ===
Parts of Burbank and Sun Valley, previously affected by the La Tuna Fire in 2017, received four inches (100 mm) of rain and were evacuated ahead of potential mudslides. A debris flow into a residential area of Sun Valley damaged 40 to 45 homes and carried a vehicle that struck a natural gas pipeline, which began to leak. Mandatory evacuations were ordered for nearby areas of the San Fernando Valley affected by the Creek Fire before the storm, but no major damage was reported.

=== Orange and Riverside counties ===
Heavy rain in Corona, affected by the Canyon Fire, covered streets with mud and flooded into several homes, but no major damage was reported.

== Response ==
More than 1,250 firefighters from California and other states, along with the California Conservation Corps and California National Guard, were dispatched to Santa Barbara County for search and rescue operations. Numerous civilian volunteers also came out in force to help with the clean up effort. The Federal Emergency Management Agency announced that emergency assistance funds related to the wildfires would be extended to cover damage from the mudflows. The U.S. Army Corps of Engineers also worked quickly in awarding contracts that involved removal of debris from various water basins and channels.

Approximately 300 residents of the Romero Canyon neighborhood near Montecito were rescued via a helicopter airlift after roads were blocked by debris.

== See also ==
- List of landslides
- 2005 La Conchita landslide
- 2014 Oso mudslide
- 2017 California floods
