= Southern California wildfires =

Southern California wildfires may refer to:

- December 2017 Southern California wildfires
- January 2025 Southern California wildfires
