= Thomas Fire =

2017 wildfire in Southern California

- Part of the December 2017 Southern California wildfires
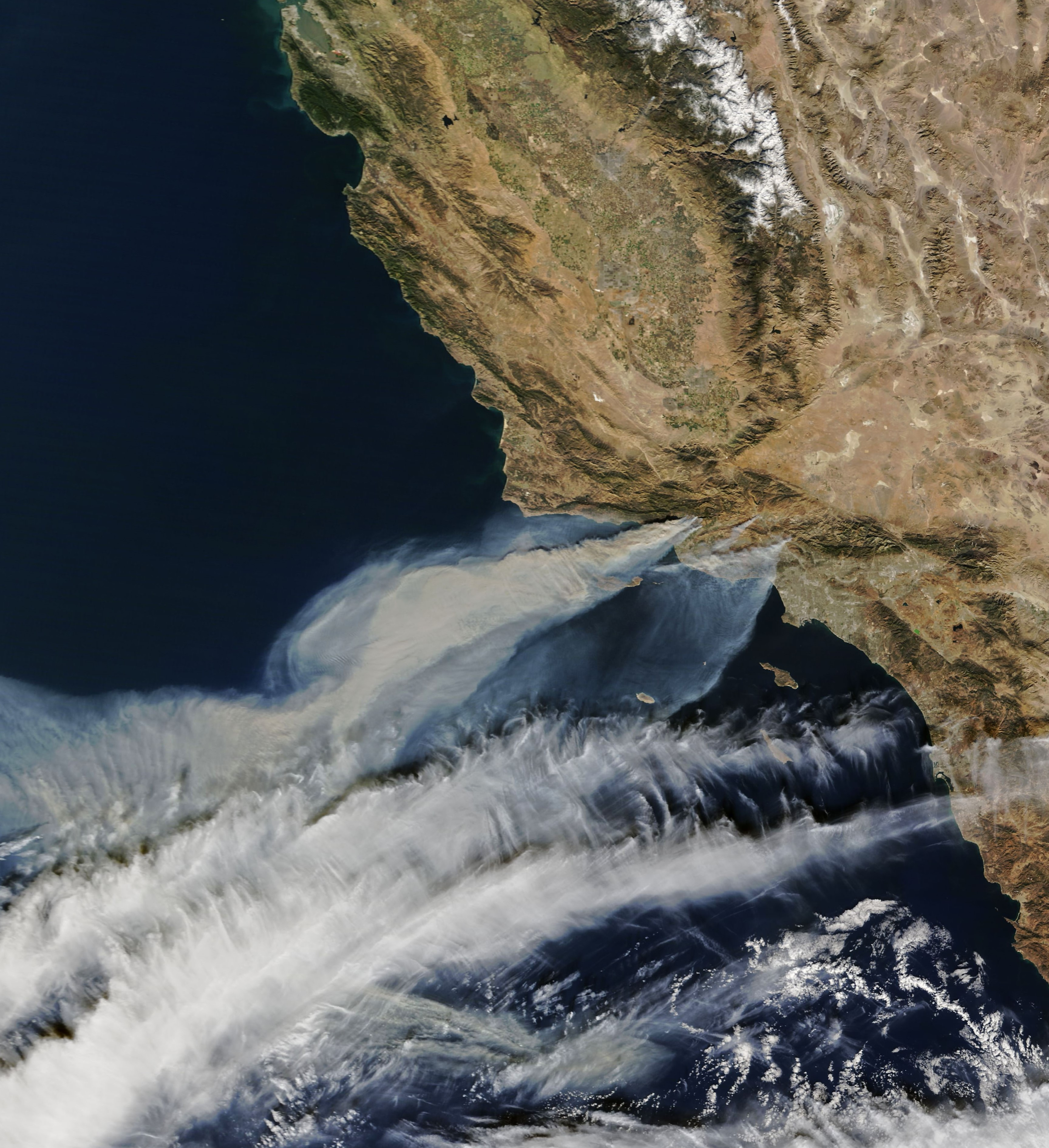
1 / Thomas Fire	2 / Rye Fire	3 / Creek Fire
A Terra satellite photo of the smoke plumes from the Thomas Fire (left) and two others on December 5, 2017
- Date: December 4, 2017 –; January 12, 2018
- Location: Ojai, Santa Paula, Fillmore, Ventura, in Ventura County, and Santa Barbara County, California, U.S. near State Route 150

Statistics
- Burned area: 281,893 acres (114,078 ha; 440 sq mi; 1,141 km^{2})
- Land use: Residential, business, oil wells, agriculture, wilderness

Impacts
- Deaths: 1 firefighter, 1 civilian directly 21 civilians indirectly (mud/debris flows in 2018)
- Injuries: 2 firefighters
- Structures destroyed: 1,063 buildings
- Cost: >$2.2 billion (2018 USD)

Ignition
- Cause: Downed power lines

Map
- Map

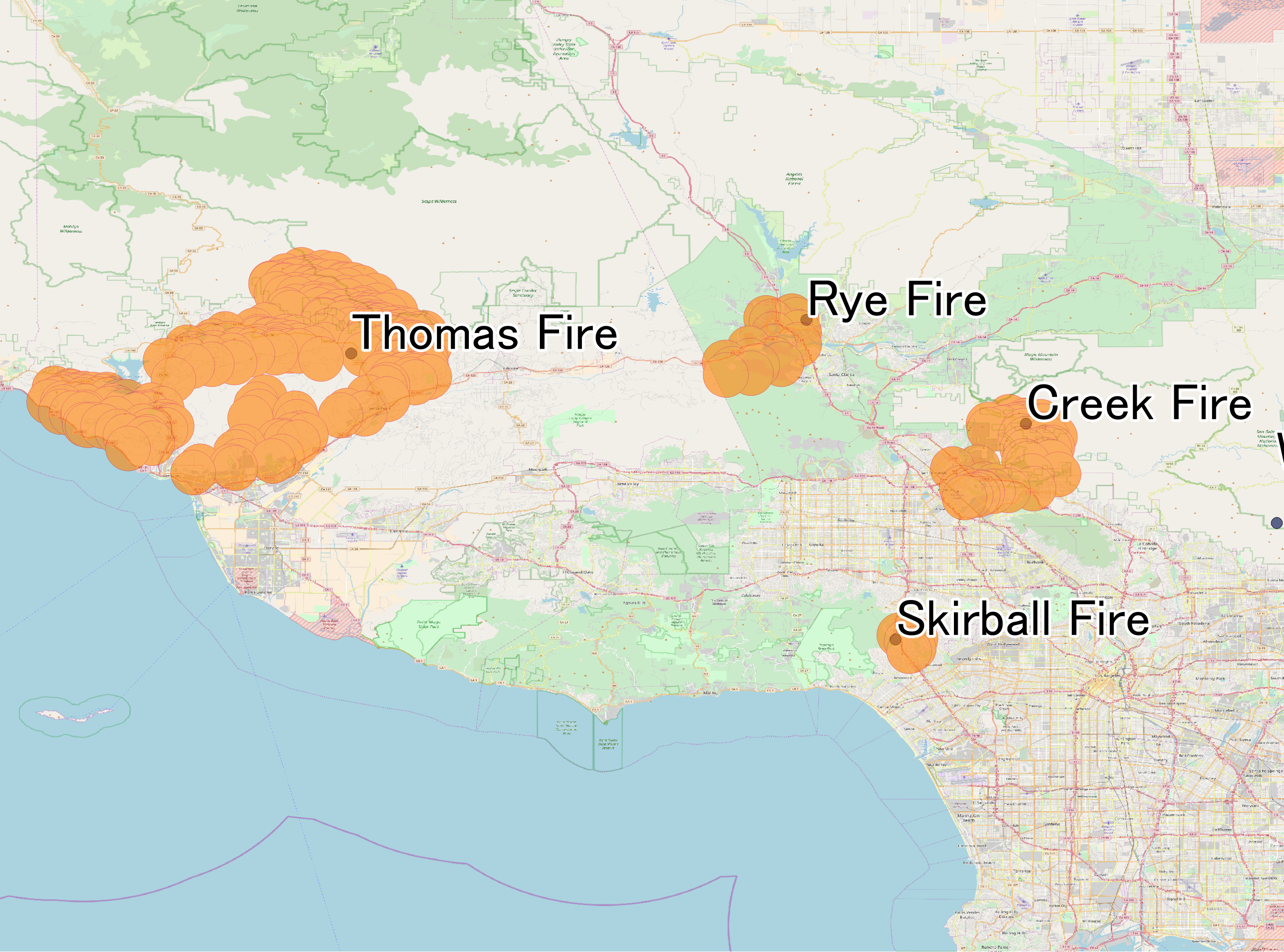
Map of the Thomas Fire and adjacent fires

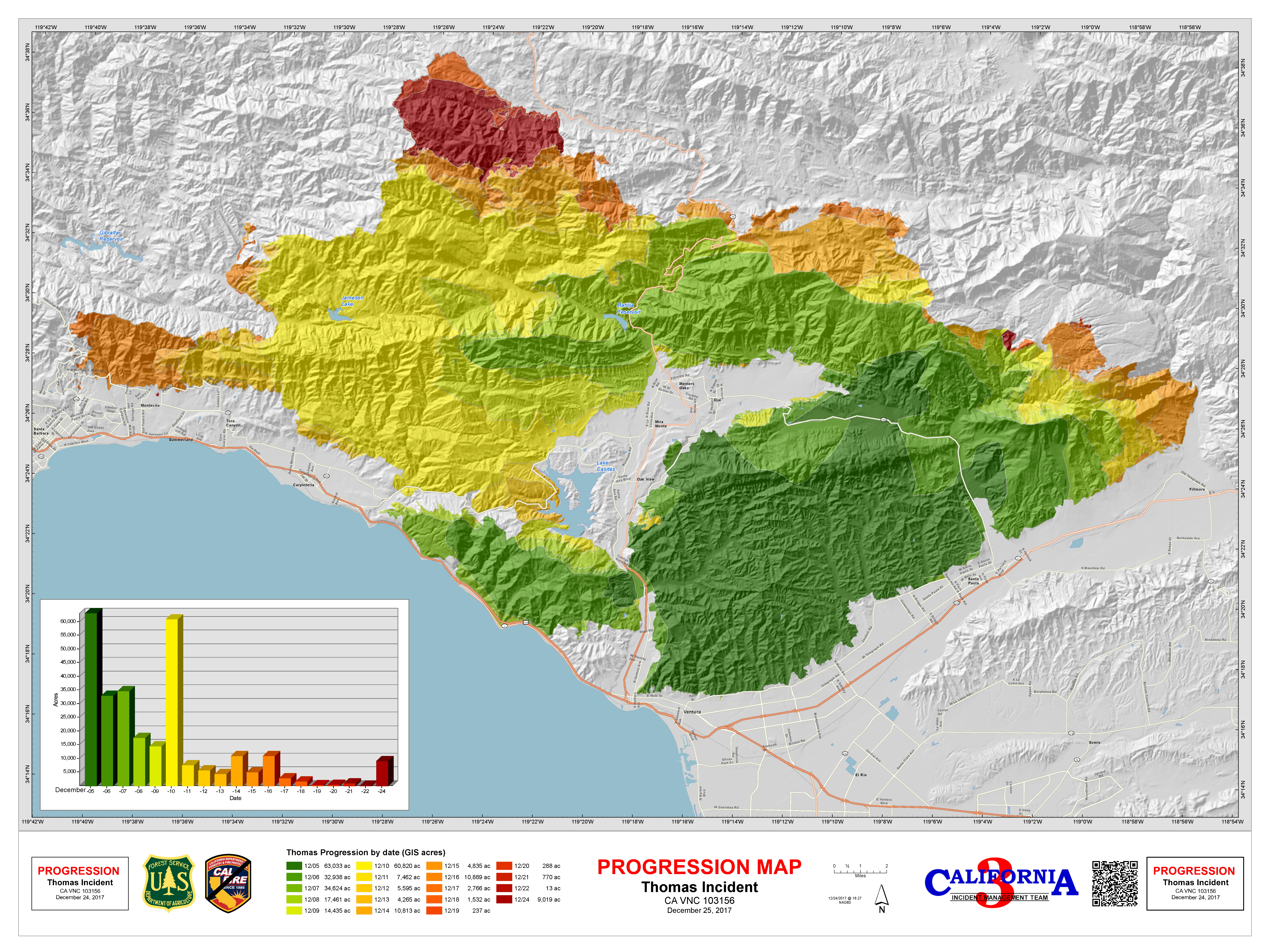
Progression of the Thomas Fire, by December 25, 2017

The Thomas Fire was a massive wildfire that affected Ventura and Santa Barbara counties, and one of multiple wildfires that ignited in Southern California in December 2017. It burned approximately 281,893 acres (440 sq mi; 114,078 ha) before being fully contained on January 12, 2018, making it the largest wildfire in modern California history at the time. It was surpassed by the Ranch Fire, part of the Mendocino Complex, in August 2018. (Note: California fire records prior to 1932 are less reliable, according to the California Department of Forestry and Fire Protection.) The fire is currently the eighth-largest wildfire in modern California history, as of 2025. The fire was officially declared out on June 1, 2018, after more than two months in which no hotspots were detected. The Thomas Fire destroyed at least 1,063 structures, while damaging 280 others; and the fire caused over $2.2 billion (2018 USD) in damages, including $230 million in suppression costs, entering the 10 most destructive wildfires in state history at the time. As of May 2026, the Thomas Fire is California's 17th-most destructive wildfire. Ventura's agriculture industry suffered at least $171 million in losses due to the Thomas Fire.

By January 2, 2018, the Thomas Fire had cost over $204 million to fight, and had forced over 104,607 residents to evacuate. At its height, the Thomas Fire saw over 8,500 firefighters mobilized to fight it, which is the largest mobilization of firefighters for combating any wildfire in California history.

The fire began on December 4, north of Santa Paula, near Steckel Park and south of Thomas Aquinas College from which the fire was named. Though the fire started near the college, no buildings at the college were burned in the fire. The fire quickly reached the city of Ventura, where over five hundred residences were destroyed that night. The fire destroyed almost as many residences in several rural communities amidst the rugged mountain terrain of Ventura County. The fire threatened the Ojai Valley, and on December 13, the fire completely surrounded the area, including Lake Casitas. The fire began burning through the rugged Santa Ynez Mountains as it threatened several small communities along the Rincon Coast north of Ventura, expanded into the Los Padres National Forest, and reached Santa Barbara County. Firefighters concentrated on protecting the communities of Carpinteria and Montecito in the southern portion of the county as the fire burned in the foothills of the Santa Ynez Mountains where access was difficult.

The unusually strong and persistent Santa Ana winds were the largest factor in the spread of the fire. Much of Southern California experienced "the strongest and longest duration Santa Ana wind event we have seen so far this season", according to the National Weather Service. The region experienced an on-and-off Santa Ana wind event for a little over two weeks, which contributed to the Thomas Fire's persistent growths in size. At its height, the wildfire was powerful enough to generate its own weather, qualifying it as a firestorm. There were periods of time when the fire was advancing at a rate of an acre (0.4 ha) per second. The winds also dried out the air, resulting in extremely low humidity. The area, along with most of Southern California, experienced the driest March-through-December period on record.

While November is the typical beginning of the rainy season in California, the first measurable rain for the area fell on January 8, 2018, more than a month into the fire. With the natural vegetation burnt, flash floods and mudflows damaged homes in Montecito when the rains arrived. Evacuations were ordered or anticipated for neighborhoods that sit below areas recently burned by the Thomas Fire and other wildfires. By January 10, at least 21 people had been killed by the sudden flooding and debris flows that followed the heavy rains, which also destroyed over 100 homes.

== Progression ==
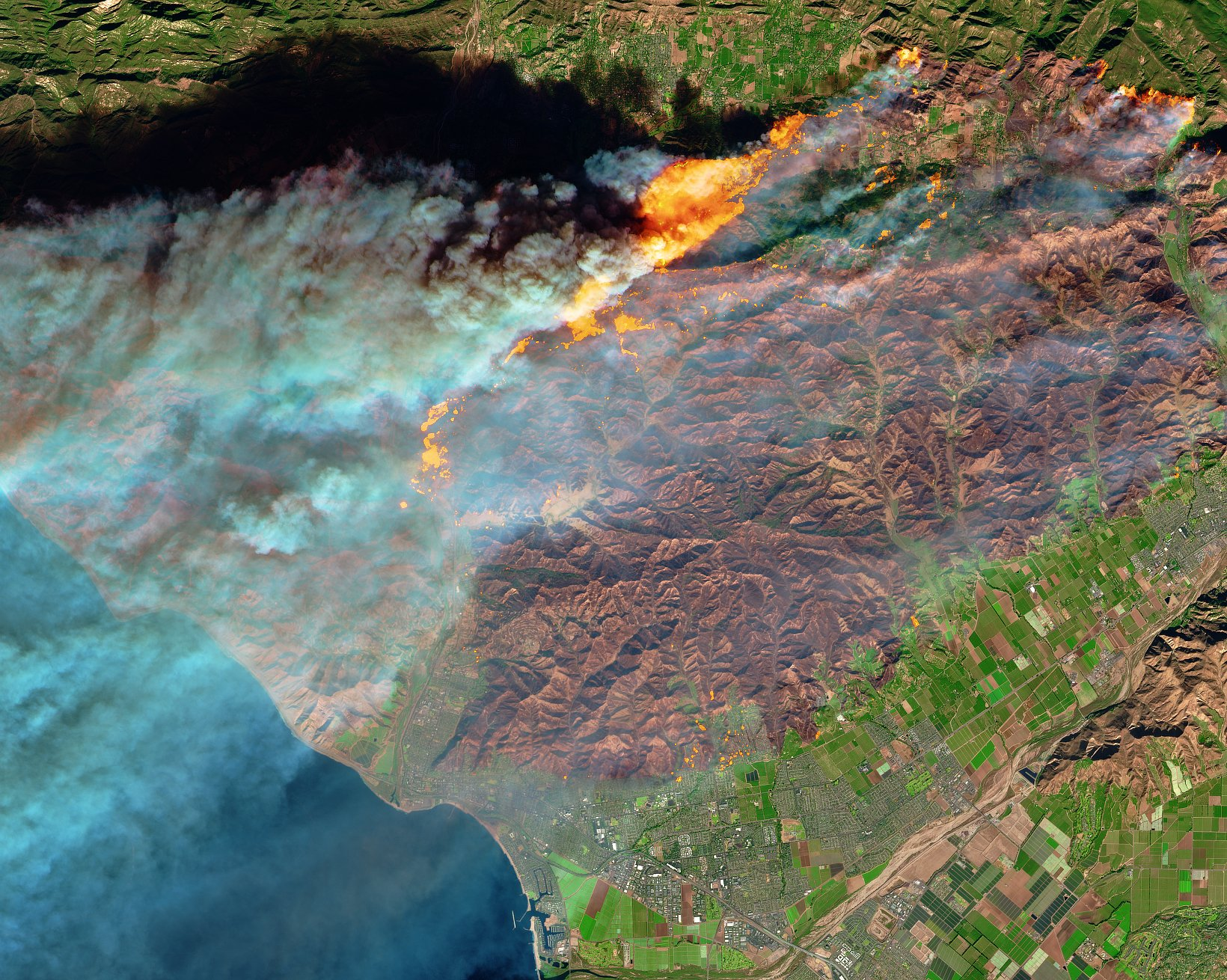
False color satellite image of the Thomas Fire's burn scar and active flames, on December 7

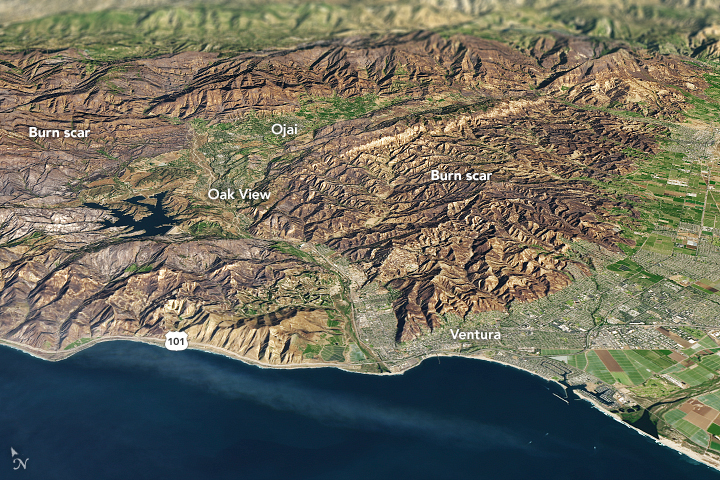
The Thomas Fire burn area as seen from Landsat 8, on December 18, 2017

=== December 2017 ===
On December 4, 2017, the fire was first reported by a nearby resident at 6:26 p.m. PST, to the north of Santa Paula, near Steckel Park and Thomas Aquinas College, after which the fire is named. That night, the small brush fire exploded in size and raced through the rugged mountain terrain that lies west of Santa Paula, between Ventura and Ojai. Officials blamed strong Santa Ana winds that gusted up to 60 miles per hour (97 km/h) for the sudden expansion. Soon after the fire had started, a second blaze was ignited nearly 30 minutes later, about 4 miles (6.4 km) to the north in Upper Ojai at the top of Koenigstein Road. According to eyewitnesses, this second fire was sparked by an explosion in the power line over the area. The second fire was rapidly expanded by the strong Santa Ana winds, and soon merged into the Thomas Fire later that night. According to statements released by investigators on March 13, 2019, Southern California Edison was responsible for both ignitions.

Late on the night of December 4, the Thomas Fire reached the hillside neighborhoods of Clearpoint, Ondulando, and Skyline in the city of Ventura and destroyed many single-family detached homes. Many people fled with little or no warning when evacuation orders were issued, as the fire had traveled 12 miles (19 km) in just a few hours.

Tuesday morning, on December 5, saw 1,000 firefighters battling the blaze, with no containment of the fire. At 7 a.m. PST, one helicopter began dropping water, while fixed-wing aircraft waited to be deployed after the winds died down. The firefighters tried to save Ventura homes in the midst of a red-flag wind advisory with ridgeline winds of 35 to 45 miles per hour (56 to 72 km/h) and gusts up to 70 miles per hour (110 km/h). The fire continued jumping across the valleys along the steep slopes of the foothills that abut the northern portion of the city. As the fire traveled along the interface between the foothill rangeland and the area developed with homes, it reached the hills above downtown where several apartment buildings and other homes above downtown Ventura were damaged or completely destroyed. The fire burned over Grant Park above City Hall, and burned along the ridge above the western portion of the city, which stretches north along the narrow Ventura River valley, and is characterized by steeply-sloped sides.

The fire continued moving north up the valley throughout the day. The entire community of Casitas Springs, which lies northwest of Ventura, had a mandatory evacuation issued as the fire approached. The fire reached Black Mountain overlooking Ojai. The entire Ojai Valley was given mandatory or voluntary evacuation orders. The Ojai pumping system was damaged by the fire and the entire water system stopped working for a time so water was not available from the hydrants for use by the firefighters. The western flank of the fire jumped over Highway 33 and burned through the Taylor Ranch oil fields on the other side of the valley. The fast-moving, wind-driven wildfire continued past the area that had burned in the 2015 Christmas Day Solimar Fire, before crossing the 101 Freeway to the Solimar Beach area, on Pacific Coast Highway, along the Pacific Ocean. The fire continued its northwesterly march along the Rincon Coast to Rincon Point, at the Santa Barbara County/Ventura County line.

On Tuesday, December 5, additional National Guard helicopters were brought in to fight the six largest wildfires burning in Southern California. Officials said they also obtained "every last plane we could find in the nation." C-130 airplanes were obtained from the U.S. military, and more than 290 fire engines came from Montana, Utah, New Mexico, Idaho, Arizona, Oregon, and Nevada.

On December 7, the Thomas Fire grew further to 115,000 acres (46,539 ha), with containment of the fire at 5%. On December 8, the Thomas Fire grew to 143,000 acres (58,000 ha) with containment of the wildfire increasing to 10%, after the Santa Ana winds died down.

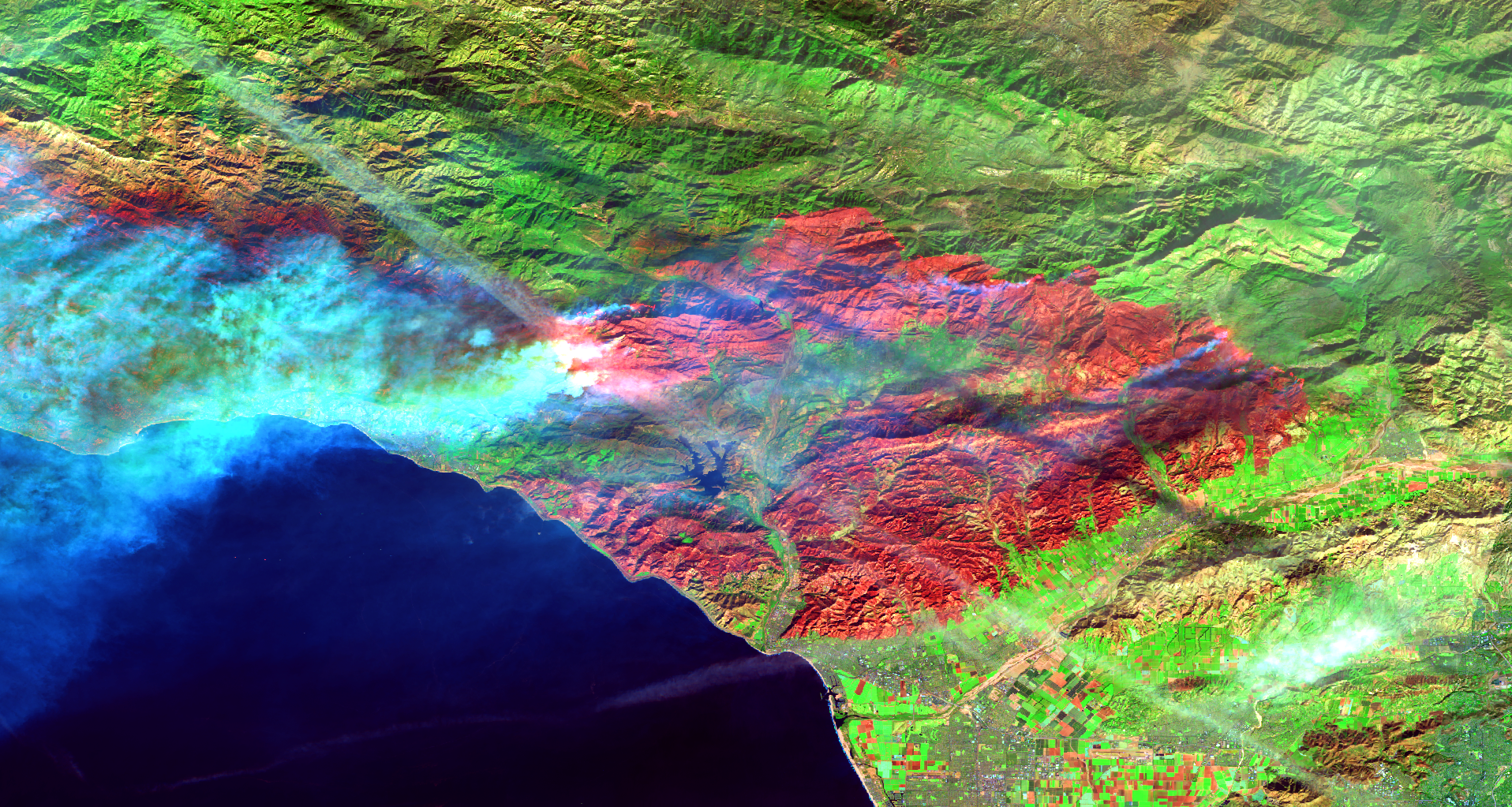
Thomas Fire, December 9, 2017, Landsat 8, bands 758. Data source: https://earthexplorer.usgs.gov/

On December 9, as the Santa Ana winds returned, the Thomas Fire expanded to 155,000 acres (63,000 ha), while containment of the fire increased to 15%. By the afternoon of the same day, the fire entered Santa Barbara County near Divide Peak.

Early on December 10, the Thomas fire expanded to 173,000 acres (70,000 ha), but containment of the blaze stayed the same as the previous date, at 15% total containment. The evacuation orders were expanded further north into Santa Barbara County into the communities of Carpinteria and Montecito. Only the southern and southeastern flanks of the wildfire had been contained. However, by the evening of the same day, the powerful Santa Ana winds had caused the Thomas Fire to undergo another period of explosive growth, expanding to 230,000 acres (93,000 ha) in size, with containment dropping to 10% overall, indicating no new progress in fire containment. Another firefighter was injured, when he fractured his leg, and he returned home to recover.

On the same day, fire analysts stated that the Thomas Fire had been generating its own weather for the past two days, a behavior only observed in very massive wildfires and indicative of a firestorm. The Thomas Fire was generating massive pyrocumulus clouds, which were gathering heat from the flames below, although the unstable column of air could collapse at any time, which would generate sudden wind shifts near the fire and pose a major hazard to firefighters. This behavior had been previously observed during the massive 2009 Station Fire in Los Angeles. At this point, the Thomas Fire had become the fifth-largest wildfire in modern California history and the largest wildfire recorded in California in December. The Thomas Fire was also estimated to be at least the 10th most destructive wildfire on record in California.

On the morning of December 11, the Thomas Fire had grown to 230,500 acres (93,300 ha), while containment of the fire had increased to 15%. After this expansion in size, the Thomas Fire's northwestern flank almost linked up with its southwestern flank, to the east of Carpinteria, cutting across parts of Route 150, and threatening to envelop Ojai and Lake Casitas. By this time, the Thomas Fire had grossly surpassed the size of the previous largest fire in December, which was extremely unusual. Fire officials noted that many areas had been "Moonscaped", an event in which the brush has been so completely burned that it was left looking like a barren and blackened landscape, resembling the surface of the Moon, which is indicative of extreme fire behavior. During the evening of December 11, the Thomas Fire expanded further to 231,700 acres (93,800 ha), while firefighters increased containment of the fire to 20%.

On December 13, the Thomas Fire's expansion slowed on its west flank, as it reached the burn area of the 240,000-acre Zaca Fire (97,000 ha) from 2007. However, the Thomas Fire's northwestern and southwestern flanks merged on the western shore of Lake Casitas, completely encircling the lake and the Ojai area. Firefighters have expected the fire's growth to be disrupted if it reaches the burn scars of other previous fires to the west within the last 10 years: the Tea, Jesusita, Gap, and Rey Fires.

On December 14, the Thomas Fire expanded further to 242,500 acres (98,100 ha), surpassing the Zaca Fire to become the fourth-largest wildfire in modern California history. Later on the same day, the Thomas Fire expanded further to 249,500 acres (101,000 ha). On the same day, a Cal Fire Engineer (Cory David Iverson) died, while working northwest of Fillmore, on a flareup near the eastern flank of the fire.

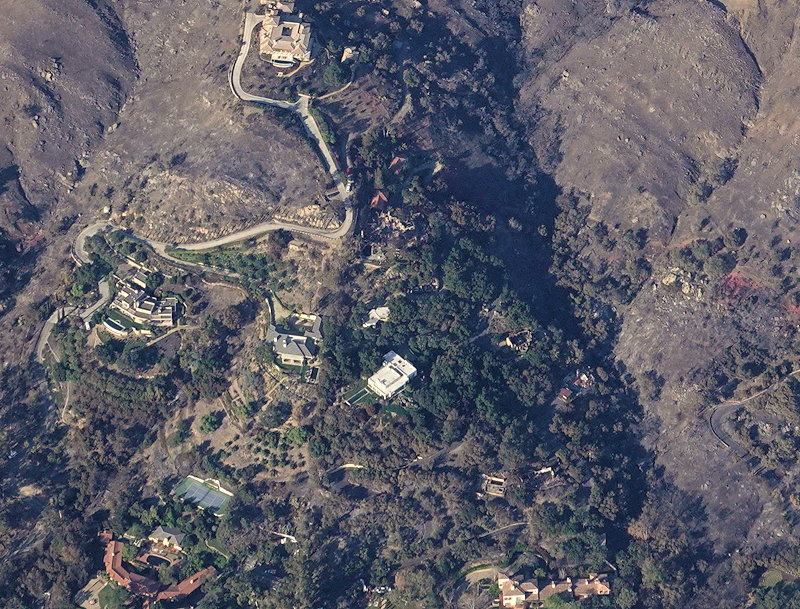
Aerial view of homes in Montecito

On the morning of December 15, containment lines in the Santa Barbara and Montecito areas and protecting nearby homes was the priority, in addition to the threatened Carpinteria and Summerland areas. Officials feared the sundowner winds could push the fire into those communities as they blow south from the mountains down to the coast, and because they also dry out the air. Although they prevented the fire from reaching the community, it still grew to 259,000 acres (105,000 ha) with 40% containment on the morning of December 16, surpassing the Rim Fire in size, and becoming the third-largest wildfire in the modern history of California. Around this time, officials and experts feared that the Thomas Fire could surpass the Santiago Canyon Fire of 1889, which had burned over 300,000 acres (120,000 ha), and is believed to be California's all-time largest wildfire on record.

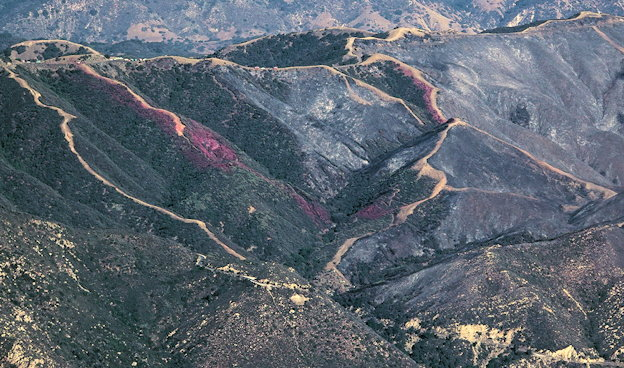
The northwest edge of the Thomas Fire's burn area, north of Santa Barbara.

On December 17, the Thomas Fire expanded to 270,000 acres (110,000 ha), with 45% containment, reaching the burn scar of the 2008 Tea Fire and the 2009 Jesusita Fire. However, the weakening of Santa Ana winds in the evening allowed firefighters to make progress on containing the fire, with firefighters able to keep the Thomas Fire from burning southward into the majority of nearby homes, and they also attacked the western front of the fire.

On December 18, firefighters began a large firing operation north of the Thomas Fire, south of Route 33, in order to clear away excess brush, and to attempt to control the Thomas Fire's northward expansion. Firefighters hoped that the winds would push the control fires southward, away from the highway and towards the main body of the Thomas Fire. Fire officials stated that the control burns could scorch up to 20,000 acres (8,100 ha), before they connect with the main portion of the Thomas Fire.

On December 19, the Thomas Fire grew to 272,000 acres (110,000 ha), with 55% containment, surpassing the burn area of the Rush Fire in California to become the second-largest wildfire in modern California history. On December 21, all evacuation orders for Santa Barbara County were lifted, as firefighters continued to make progress on containing the wildfire. By this point, the Thomas Fire had become the 7th most destructive wildfire in California history.

During the evening of December 22, the Thomas Fire expanded to 273,400 acres (110,600 ha), with containment remaining at 65% for the second day, surpassing the Cedar Fire of 2003 to become California's largest wildfire in modern history. By this point, however, fire officials stated that any further growths in the fire's size would likely be due to control burns from firing operations, due to more favorable weather conditions for firefighting. Due to the cooler temperatures and increase in humidity, the control fires were not spreading as intended, so firefighters used flamethrowers to spread the control flames manually.

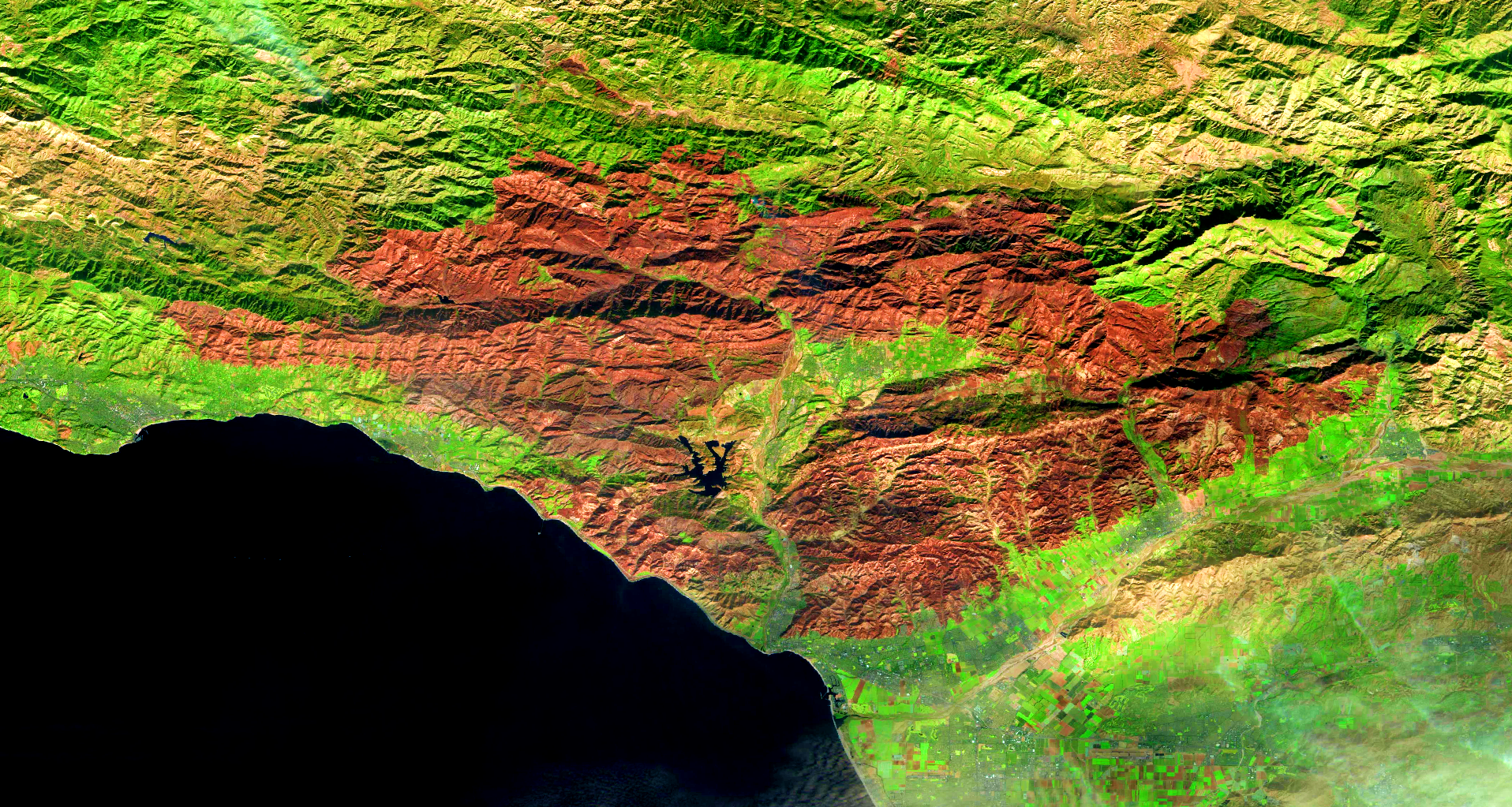
Thomas Fire satellite image, December 23, 2017, ESA Sentinel-2, data source: https://earthexplorer.usgs.gov/

On December 23, fire growth paused, and containment of the wildfire was brought up to 70%. By the evening of the same day, firefighters had completed firing operations near the northwestern flank of the Thomas Fire, with no more planned for the time being. However, on December 24, the Thomas Fire grew to 281,620 acres (113,970 ha), after the fires from the back-burning operations completely merged into the Thomas Fire, though containment of the wildfire also increased to 86%. The Thomas Fire had ignited about 30 oil seep fires within the fire perimeter, at the Upper Ojai area. Fire officials had ordered a foam product to help extinguish the oil seep fires, though officials warned that the products may cause more smoke upon application. Favorable weather conditions continued, with a few snow flurries precipitating over the Thomas Fire on the same day.

On December 26, the Thomas Fire remained at 281,620 acres (113,970 ha); no further growth in the fire's size was anticipated at this point. The number of firefighters deployed decreased to about 900, and containment of the Thomas Fire increased to 88%. That same day, CAL FIRE released a chart with the top 20 largest wildfires in California history, adding the Thomas Fire as the new largest fire.

On December 27, the Thomas Fire experienced another small expansion in size on its northeastern flank, to 281,893 acres (114,078 ha), while containment of the wildfire increased to 91%. Early on December 29, the Thomas Fire was 92% contained, with no further increases in size. On the same day, a smoldering area within the western edge of the Thomas Fire's perimeter, near Gibraltar Road, flared up, sending smoke over Santa Barbara. However, firefighters were able to extinguish the new flames by 1 p.m. PST on the same day.

On December 30, incident command was transferred to a local team headed by the Los Padres National Forest staff, and the Thomas Fire remained at 92% containment. At that time, fire officials decided to let the remaining flames within the Thomas Fire's perimeter burn out; afterward, full containment of the wildfire was not expected until January 21, 2018.

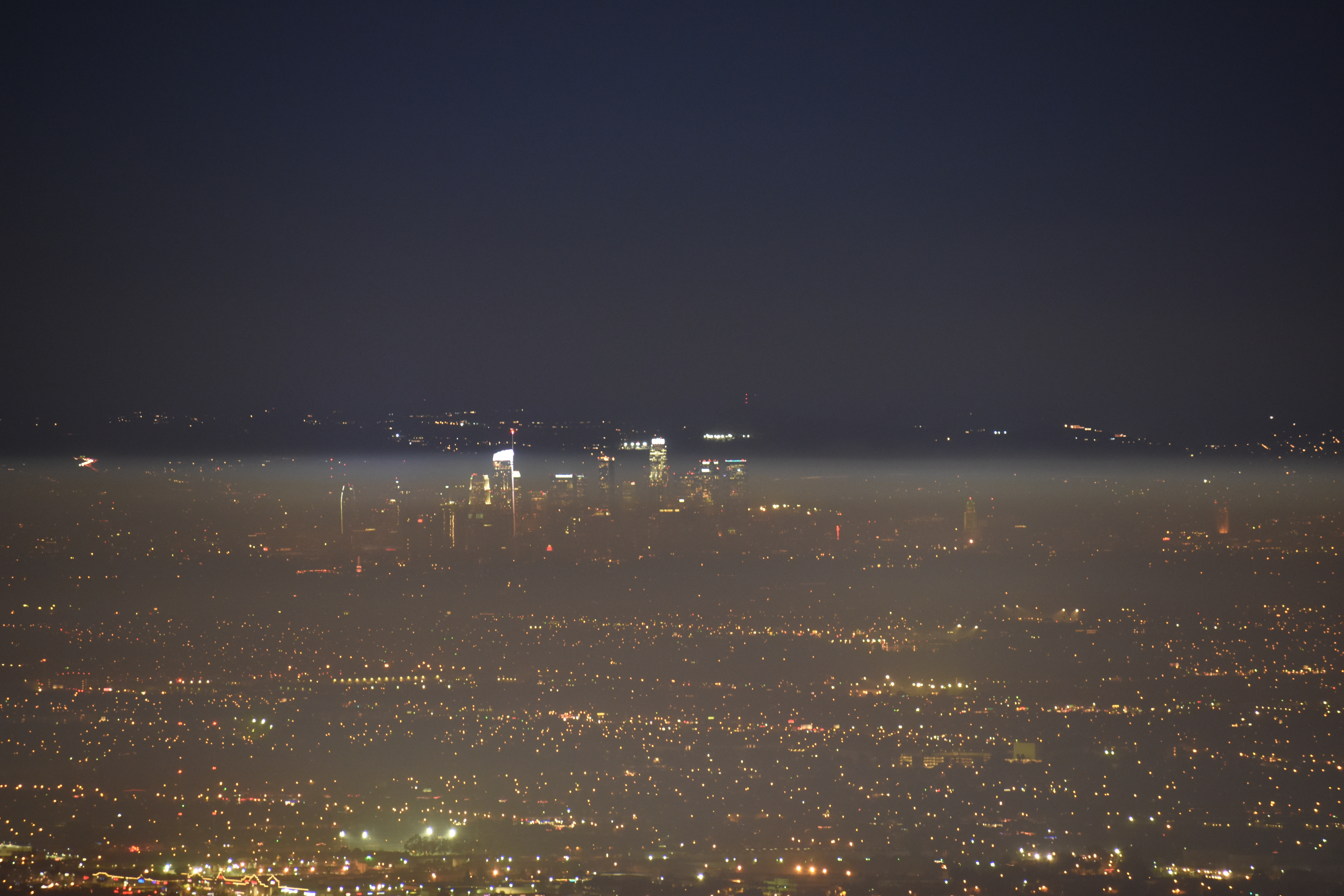
The city of Los Angeles was covered in a thick layer of smoke during the Thomas Fire.

=== January–March 2018 ===
On January 8, 2018, a winter storm began moving ashore in California, bringing heavy rain to Southern California and prompting mandatory evacuations in parts of Los Angeles, Santa Barbara, and Ventura Counties, over potential mudslides in areas affected by wildfires. The storm intensified on the following day, with at least four inches (100 mm) of rain falling over the two-day period, before the rainfall ended on January 9, causing several major mudflows.

On January 12, 2018, the U.S. Forest Service declared the Thomas Fire 100 percent contained, at 281,893 acres.

Afterward, Los Padres National Forest officials continued monitoring the burn area of the Thomas Fire for hotspots. On March 22, 2018, InciWeb declared the Thomas Fire to be inactive and ceased providing updates. On June 1, 2018, the Thomas Fire was officially declared to be out, after more than two months in which no hotspots were detected within the perimeter of the burn area.

== Firefighting effort ==
=== Helicopter base of operations ===
The Santa Paula Airport became a helibase for CAL FIRE by the morning after the fire started. The airport was outfitted as a base of operations for the water-dropping helicopters, and closed to all of the regular general aviation operations. About 23 helicopters began operating out of the airport, along with the necessary support crews, tanker trucks, and other equipment. In addition to water, brightly colored fire retardant was dropped on the fire from the air. During the first couple of weeks, there had been limited ability to use fixed-wing air tankers and VLAT (very large air tankers) to drop fire retardant, due to the smoky skies. After having been in the air all day, the helicopters undergo maintenance at night. Other activities included a daily briefing each morning, lunches, and distributing maps.

=== Aircraft/airdrop base of operations ===
Many aircraft and their operations moved to other airports, such as Camarillo, which remained open to normal activities, while being involved in firefighting efforts. Amid all this, the Santa Paula airport was able to make one of its hangars available for cats after one of the local animal shelters was filled to capacity, and for one local family with its dogs for three nights, on its premises as well. Additionally, The Channel Islands Air National Guard 146th AW MAFFS unit was activated for airdrops and served as an incident command center for aerial operations.

=== Out-of-state mutual aid ===
Thomas Fire: Out of State Mutual Aid

A total of ten strike teams from across the state of Oregon deployed to help California firefighters battle multiple massive blazes north of Los Angeles, including the Thomas Fire. On December 6, 2017, The Oregon Fire Marshal announced the dispatching of heavy equipment (around 75 fire engines) to help.

Strike teams from Oregon arrived from Clackamas, Klamath, Lane, Linn, Marion, Multnomah, Washington and Yamhill Counties; in addition, a combined team from Benton, Linn, and Polk Counties, and a team from the Rogue Valley area were also assisting. State fire officials announced that five additional strike teams would be deployed on the evening of Wednesday, December 6.

Firefighters from Arizona, Washington, Idaho, Montana, New Mexico, Nevada, Colorado, and Utah were also assisting in the fire suppression efforts.

A sport utility vehicle and pickup truck were donated to the Ventura City Fire Department by Direct Relief, a nonprofit emergency response organization, in an effort to support emergency response efforts during the Thomas Fire.

== Effects ==
=== Casualties ===
One firefighter died of thermal injuries and smoke inhalation on December 14, in an active area of the fire near Fillmore, and one firefighter was injured after being struck by a car on December 5. His injuries were not considered to be life-threatening. One person, a 70-year-old woman, died in a car accident while fleeing the fire on Wednesday night, December 6.

Thomas Fire

=== Damage ===
At least 1,063 structures have been destroyed in the fire. Numerous single-family homes were destroyed along with the Hawaiian Village Apartments in the hills above downtown Ventura and 12 houses for guest workers of Limoneira Co. near Santa Paula. The downtown Harbor View Apartments and the Vista del Mar hospital (a psychiatric facility) on the west side of Ventura were among the complexes that were heavily damaged. The Ojai Valley School, near the city of Ojai, was heavily damaged with two buildings being destroyed. The Thomas Fire destroyed multiple expensive homes in the Montecito area. On December 23, the Thomas Fire was estimated to have caused over $120 million in property losses, in Santa Barbara County.

Over a quarter million Southern California Edison customers lost power as a result of damage from the fire. The transmission system which runs from Ventura County to Goleta had to be shut down to prevent further problems until Edison employees could safely access the area for inspections.

An amateur radio site on Reeves Road in Ojai was heavily damaged by the fire. The site is part of a repeater network run by amateur radio operators. These volunteers plan to replace lost equipment and enhance the shared station with additional cameras, solar panels, batteries, a weather station, and other hardware.

Hawaiian Village burns down during the Thomas Fire

=== Closures and evacuations ===
Dozens of school districts implemented closures during the fire. On December 10, University of California, Santa Barbara cancelled classes, due to power outages and air quality concerns. The university also delayed its scheduled finals by a month. The expansion of the Thomas Fire also prompted more evacuation orders near Santa Barbara, with mandatory evacuation zones extending into Carpinteria and into the eastern outskirts of Santa Barbara.

Amtrak passenger rail service between Oxnard and San Luis Obispo on the Pacific Surfliner was suspended indefinitely when the fire reached the route along the Rincon north of Ventura. Highways 150, 101, and 33 were partially shut down at various times due to the fire. Officials began closing State Highway 154 for several hours each morning in order to mobilize fire equipment on December 13.

On Tuesday, December 5, the city of Ventura issued a precautionary boil-water advisory, because of the loss of pressure in the water system from power outages related to the fire. A similar warning was issued by the Casitas Municipal Water District which serves portions of the Ojai Valley and communities along the Rincon Coast from Ventura to the Santa Barbara County line. The city of Ventura also issued a curfew as a result of the fire on Tuesday, which would be effective from 10 p.m. until 5 a.m. on the next morning, until further notice. The boil alert was lifted on December 12.

=== Environmental impacts ===
Air quality warnings were issued for many areas due to the fire, because of dangerous levels of smoke and particulates. During the alerts, authorities have recommended that people stay indoors, avoid driving in affected areas and drink plenty of fluids. The east winds that have powered the fire have pushed much of the smoke out to sea or into areas somewhat distant from the fire. When the winds ease, the smoke has hung in the air in many communities. The typical moist, cool daily onshore winds in the evening have also been bringing smoke inland.

Native chaparral burned extensively to charred stems and ash. Coastal chaparral is a fire-adapted biome that burns frequently and catastrophically in Santa Ana wind. The chaparral plant species readily re-sprout or regenerate from serotinous seed in the Mediterranean climate of coastal, Southern California.

The Inter-agency Thomas Fire Command mapped at least 50 chaparral fires of various sizes that had burned in the Thomas Fire area since 1950. The 1985 Wheeler Fire burned the central portion of the Thomas Fire.

=== Government response ===
In a radio interview, Neal Andrews explained how he was elected by the city council to serve as the new mayor, at the regular Monday night city council meeting in Ventura City Hall, about three hours after the fire broke out some 15 miles (24 km) away.

I got sworn in. As I walked out of City Hall, all the lights of the city went out. And that was the first indication that we had a real crisis happening.

— Neal Andrews, mayor of Ventura

On Tuesday, December 5, 2017, at 10:45 p.m. PST, Governor Jerry Brown declared a state of emergency in Ventura County, due to the Thomas Fire. On his visit to Ventura on Saturday to survey the damage, Brown called the fires a "terrible tragedy for so many people."

This is the new normal. We're about ready to have firefighting at Christmas. This is very odd and unusual.

— Governor Jerry Brown

== Aftermath ==
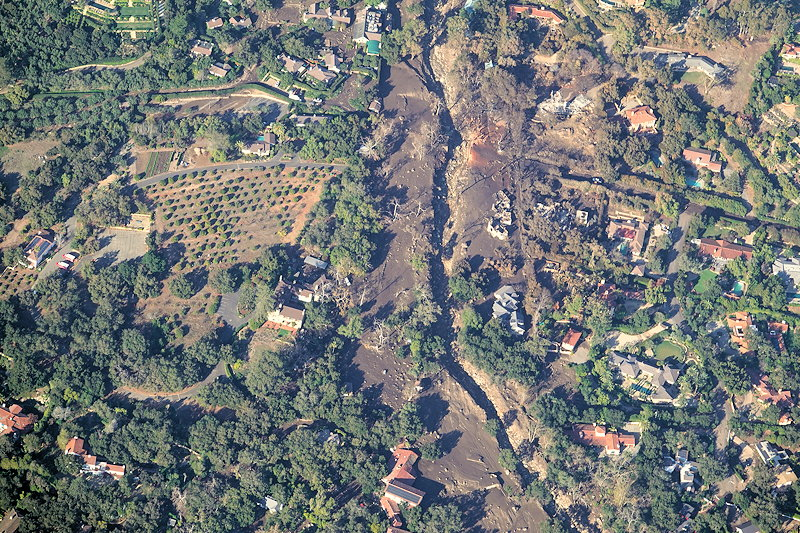
San Ysidro Ck. after the debris flow

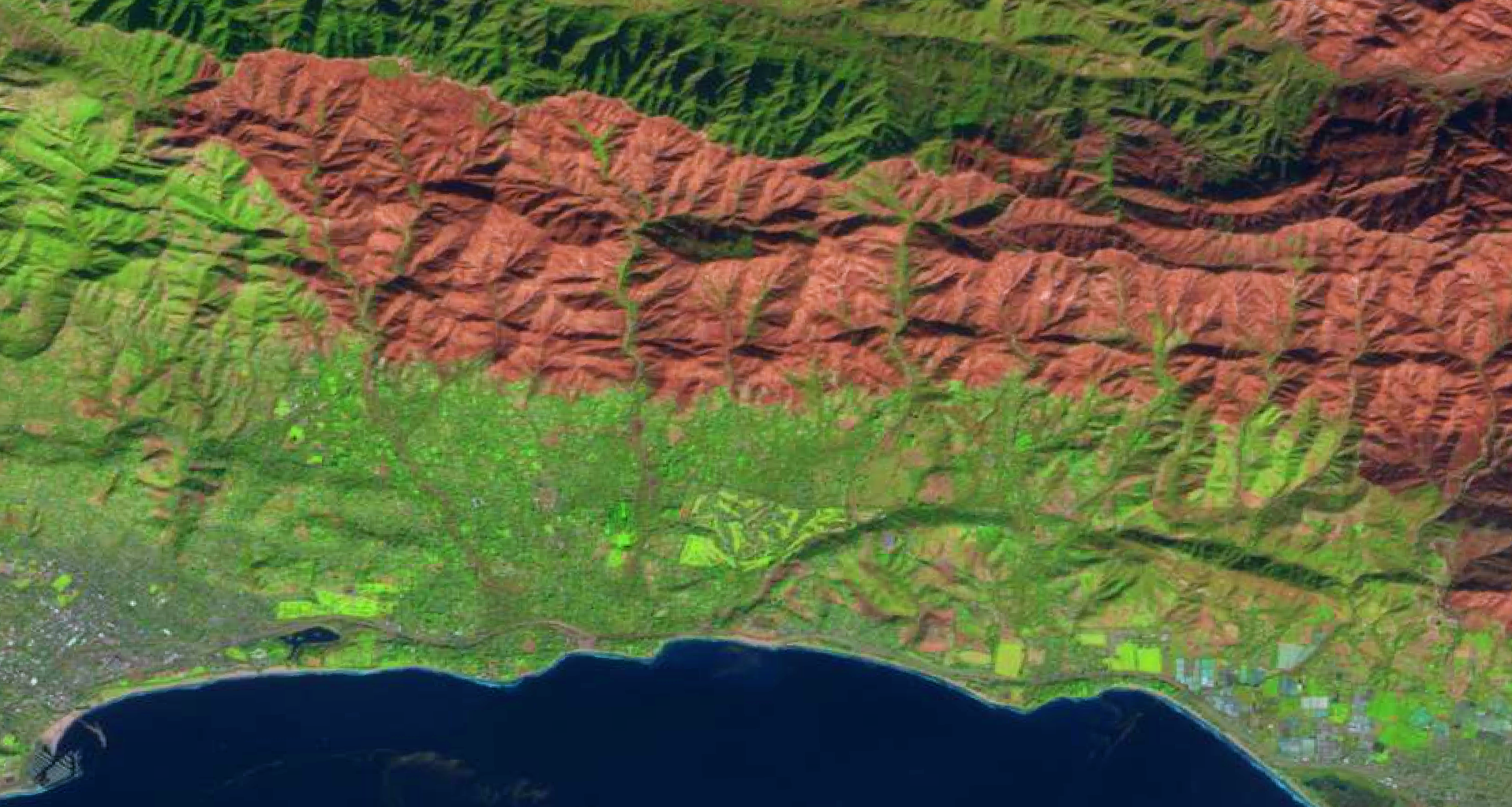
Montecito, California, January 12, 2018, showing stream channels damaged by debris flow of January 9, 2018 ESA Sentinel-2 infrared, false color satellite image. Scale 1:24,000. Data source: https://earthexplorer.usgs.gov/

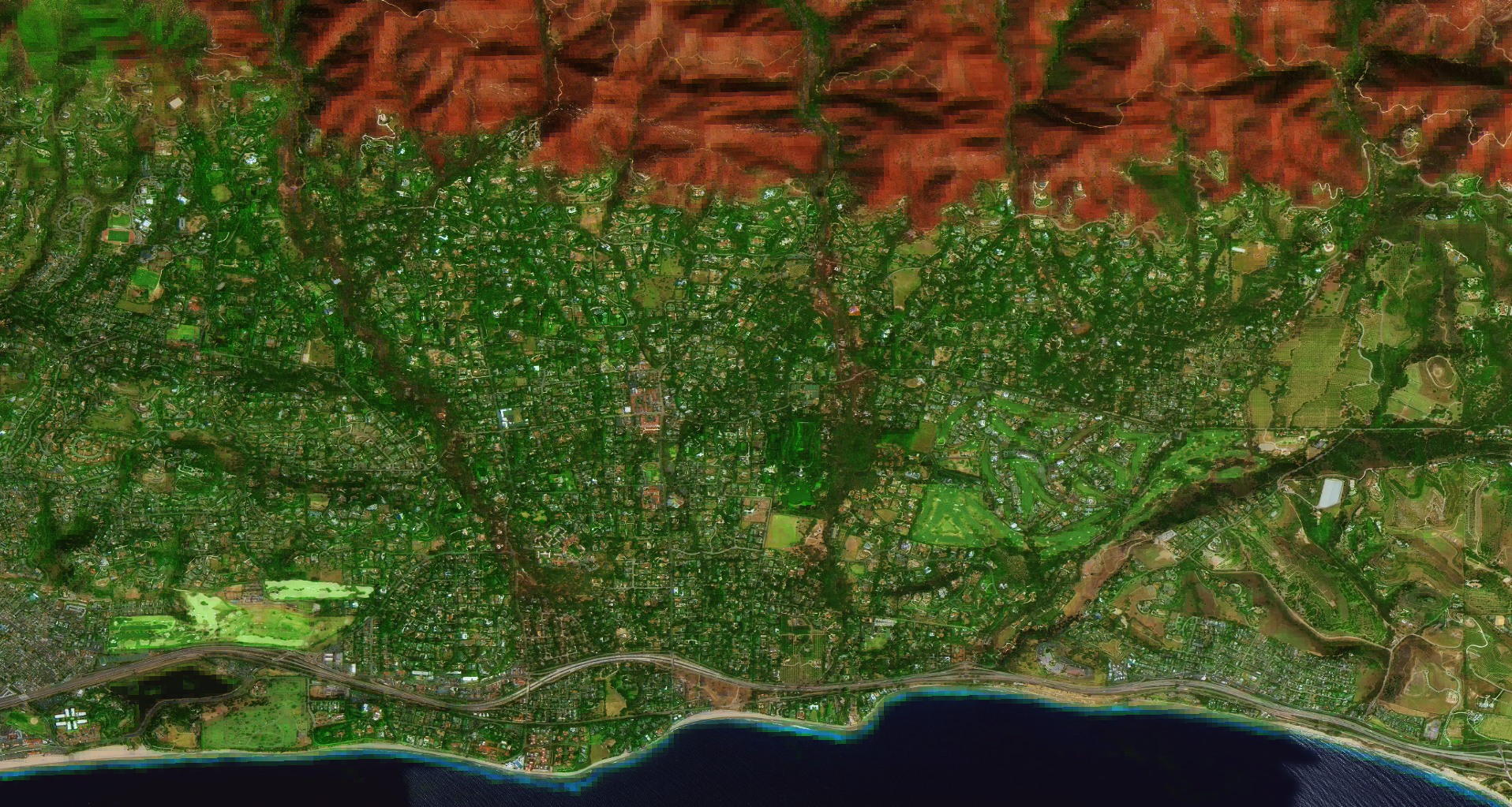
Montecito, California, January 26, 2018, Landsat 8, band 758 and 2016 NAIP orthophoto overlay. Scale 1:12,000. Thomas Fire and January 9, 2018 debris flow deposits.

=== Debris flows in Montecito ===
On January 9, 2018, 3:30 AM, PST, 0.54 inches (14 mm) of rain in 5 minutes was reported at Montecito. Heavy rain on burned hill slopes above the community resulted in rapid erosion, mud flow and debris flow (mass wasting) of soil and stream channels, causing catastrophic damage in Montecito Creek and San Ysidro Creek.

On January 21, 21 fatalities, 2 missing persons, 129 destroyed residences and 307 damaged residences, attributed to debris flows, were reported by the inter-agency, storm-response team in Santa Barbara County.

Writer T.C. Boyle, whose Montecito home was within the proximity of both the fire and mudslides, documented the collective trauma in The New Yorker magazine.

Debris flows are generated in the following general sequence of events: Fire reduces the organic soil layer to ash and char. Water-repellent, organic hydrocarbons condense in shallow, mineral soil, enhancing runoff. Locally heavy rain, exceeding the infiltration rate of the soil, generates surface runoff. Eroded unconsolidated sediment and ash is suspended and dissolved, increasing the density of the flow. Pore water pressure developed in unconsolidated soil and sediment causes liquefaction. Erosion increases as gravity drives mud flow through the drainage basin in confined channels. Mud flows mobilize woody debris and larger sedimentary particles as debris flow, which continues to accumulate as smaller channels combine with larger channels. As the size of the debris flow increases, larger particles are entrained, channel erosion occurs, landslides and vegetation are incorporated. Multiple debris flows may be generated in the eroding, mountainous portion of the drainage basin. Debris flows typically surge, as precipitation rate and sediment supply vary, hydraulic jumps occur, landslide dams in the channel form and collapse. Upon exiting the steeper mountain canyon, as the stream gradient is reduced, the debris flow spreads laterally and begins to deposit larger particles on the alluvial fan. Where the stream channel is plugged with debris, lateral channel migration occurs, building upon the existing alluvial fan deposits. Deposition also occurs down-stream of the alluvial fan, where stream gradient decreases, on the floodplain, alluvial plain, coastal plain and river delta. As precipitation, subsurface flow, runoff, stream flow and supply of sediment and debris decreases, the stream reverts to low-flow characteristics. It takes years for disturbed channels to achieve relative stability as bed load sediment adjusts and vegetation is reestablished.

=== Recovery ===
A disaster relief center was set up to assist victims with interim and longer term living arrangements. Home owners could get help navigating the difficult and often confusing process of clearing the rubble at their home site and preparing to rebuild. The Federal Emergency Management Agency (FEMA) partnered with state and local agencies to operate the center along with offering loans and assistance in getting medical prescriptions filled.

Clean up of materials like asbestos, pesticides, plastics, and electronic devices began almost immediately after the flames were out. The ruins of burned homes and vehicles can have a harmful impact on the surrounding environment.

Santa Barbara Fire History Map from 1950 to 2017. Source: Inciweb

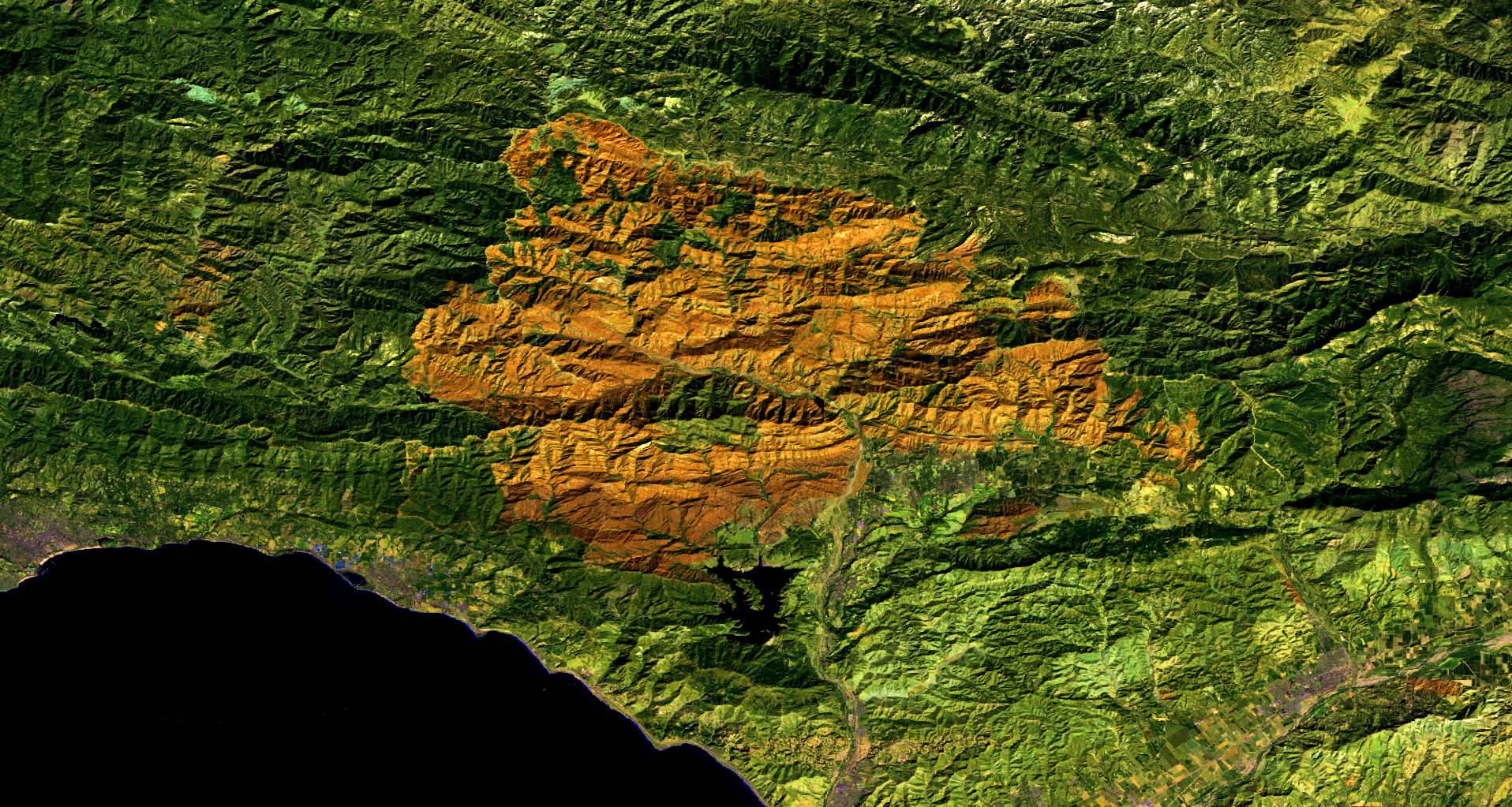
Wheeler Fire, 1985, false color, infrared satellite image. Landsat 5, band 753, data source: https://earthexplorer.usgs.gov/

== Investigation ==
Soon after the Thomas Fire started, officials began to investigate the cause of the wildfire. The Thomas Fire originated as two separate fires, with the first fire igniting on December 4 at 6:26 p.m. PST, on a cattle ranch on Anlauf Canyon Road near Thomas Aquinas College, while the second fire started about 30 minutes later, nearly 4 miles (6.4 km) north in Upper Ojai, at the top of Koenigstein Road. The newer fire quickly merged into the Thomas Fire later that night. Residents on Koenigstein Road have said that a transformer exploded, but officials have not confirmed this claim.

In March 2019, investigators determined that Southern California Edison’s equipment had sparked both ignitions that became the Thomas Fire, but in a settlement with public agencies, the utility did not admit fault. In September 2020, Edison announced a combined settlement of $1.16 billion with the insurance companies over the Thomas Fire and Montecito Mudslide. On December 16, 2021 the California Public Utilities Commission approved penalties and permanent disallowances against Southern California Edison for violations related to the ignition of five 2017–2018 Southern California wildfires. Under a proposed settlement with the CPUC’s Safety and Enforcement Division, SCE shareholders will pay a $110 million penalty to California’s General Fund, incur a $375 million permanent disallowance for cost recovery, and contribute $65 million in shareholder funds to safety measures, for a total of $550 million.

== Growth and containment progress ==
Fire containment status (InciWeb list, CAL FIRE list) Gray: contained, Red: active
Date	Acres burned	Containment
Dec 5	50,000	
Dec 6	90,000	
Dec 7	115,000	
Dec 8	143,000	
Dec 9	155,000	
Dec 10	230,000	
Dec 11	231,700	
Dec 12	236,000	
Dec 13	238,500	
Dec 14	249,500	
Dec 15	256,000	
Dec 16	267,500	
Dec 17	270,000	
Dec 18	271,000	
Dec 19	272,000	
Dec 20	272,000	
Dec 21	272,600	
Dec 22	273,400	
Dec 23	273,400	
Dec 24	281,620	
Dec 26	281,620	
Dec 27–28	281,893	
Dec 29–Jan 8	281,893	
Jan 9–11	---	---
Jan 12	281,893	

== See also ==
- 2017 California wildfires
  - October 2017 Northern California wildfires
  - December 2017 Southern California wildfires
- List of California wildfires
- 2018 Southern California mudflows
- Tubbs Fire
- October 2007 California wildfires
- Soberanes Fire
- Carr Fire
