= January 2018 Western United States floods =

Natural disaster in the United States

- Date: January 8, 2018
- Location: Western United States
- Type: flood
- Cause: rain after drought
- Deaths: 21 (in California)
- Injuries: 163 (in California)
- Missing: 2 (in California)
- Property damage: >$207 million (2018 USD); 65 residences destroyed, 462 residences damaged, 8 commercial buildings destroyed, 20 commercial buildings damaged (all in California)

The January 2018 American West floods occurred due to heavy precipitation in the Western United States. While wildfires in Southern California exacerbated the rain's effects there, other states, like Nevada, also experienced flooding.

== Effects ==
Gusts as high as 75 miles per hour (121 km/h), hurricane-force, were reported, and scattered power outages were expected. The storm brought much-needed rain to places in the desert like Las Vegas and Phoenix—with the risk of flash floods. Also, mountain snow was expected throughout the area, even into Canada, providing much-needed replenishment to snowpacks.

=== California ===
Eighteen inches (460 mm) of snow was reported on Mammoth Mountain.

The heavy rains caused flooding and mudflows in regions burned by recent wildfires, killing at least 23 people.

=== Nevada ===
Cities like Las Vegas experienced heavy flooding. Roads and highways underwater lead to road closures. At least two people had to be rescued from a flooded highway in Las Vegas. Six–twelve inches (150–300 mm) of snow were expected in the mountain of southern Nevada, causing winter warnings to be issued.

=== Oregon and Washington ===
The Portland area experienced heavy flooding, which interfered with transportation. In addition, the Northwest Avalanche Center issued a high danger warning for much of the mountainous areas of Oregon and Washington, excluding ski areas, as 4–8 inches (100–200 mm) of snow were expected. Two inches (51 mm) of rain, as well as tropical storm-force wind gusts as high as 60 miles per hour (97 km/h), were expected on the Oregon coast.

== See also ==
- 2018 Southern California mudflows
- December 2017 Southern California wildfires
