= Ojai Valley School =

Boarding school in California, USA

Location
- Ojai, CA; United States; 34°27′0″N 119°9′38″W

Information
- Type: Private, Boarding, Day
- Established: 1912
- Head of school: Craig Floyd
- Faculty: 13
- Campus size: 425 acres (1.72 km^{2})
- Colors: Green and White
- Athletics: Cross Country, Basketball, Soccer, Flag Football, Track and Field, Baseball.
- Mascot: Spud
- Website: www.ovs.org

Ojai Valley School is a co-educational independent boarding school in the Ojai Valley near the city of Ojai, California, United States. The school was founded in 1912 and offers pre-kindergarten through twelfth grade education.

The motto of the school is Integer Vitae ("wholeness of life" or "symmetry of life").

== Campus and facilities ==
The school is located on two campuses in the Ojai Valley. The Lower Campus, located near downtown Ojai, enrolls day and resident students in grades pre-kindergarten to eight. The facilities include a performing arts center, dormitories, a library, an art studio, a woodshop, a technology center, athletic fields, a swimming pool, two fields totaling half an acre, and stables for the equestrian program.

The Upper Campus is located seven miles (11 km) from downtown Ojai, in the east of the valley in Upper Ojai. The 195-acre (0.79 km^{2}) campus enrolls day and resident students in grades nine to twelve. The campus is situated on a former cattle ranch and facilities include dormitories, classrooms, athletic fields, a climbing wall and ropes course, a swimming pool, and art and ceramics studios.

Students participate in outdoor education, equestrian, fine and performing arts programs, as well as athletics and community service.

== History ==
Edward Yeomans, a Chicagoan educated at Phillips Academy and Princeton University, had written a series of articles in the Atlantic Monthly on the need for educational reform. The articles caught the eye of a wealthy businessman, Frank Frost, who persuaded Yeomans to move to Ojai and create a school that would embody his modern ideas.

At the core of Yeomans’ beliefs was the concept that children learn best through experience. Yeomans considered his own education to have been dull and stifling, and wanted to establish a school that would emphasize experiential learning and a love for the outdoors. He envisioned a place where music, art, and woodshop would be taught alongside math, history, and languages. Yeomans declared that Integer Vitae, meaning the wholeness of life, symmetry of life, and soundness of life would become the school's motto and philosophy. The school has grown from a one-room classroom serving 12 pupils to a two-campus boarding and day school for more than 300 students in pre-kindergarten to twelfth grades.

The school's Upper Campus was heavily damaged by the Thomas Fire in December 2017. The fire destroyed two buildings on Upper Ojai campus, a dormitory, and a science and technology building.
