= Creek Fire (2017) =

2017 wildfire in Southern California

- Part of the December 2017 Southern California wildfires
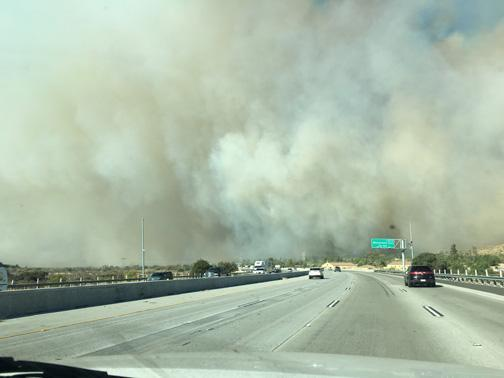
- Image of smoke coming from the Creek Fire on December 5, as the fire approached Interstate 210.
- Date: December 5, 2017 –; January 9, 2018
- Location: Kagel Canyon, Los Angeles County, California, United States
- Coordinates: 34.31283°N 118.35863°W

Statistics
- Burned area: 15,619 acres (63 km^{2})

Impacts
- Deaths: None
- Injuries: 3 firefighters
- Structures lost: 123 destroyed 81 damaged

Ignition
- Cause: LADWP power equipment (disputed)

The Creek Fire was a large wildfire that burned in Kagel Canyon and the Angeles National Forest north of Sylmar, a neighborhood in Los Angeles, California, United States, and one of multiple wildfires that broke out across Southern California in December 2017. The Creek Fire burned 15,619 acres (63 km^{2}) and destroyed 123 structures, including 60 homes, before being contained on January 9, 2018, following heavy rainfall from a winter storm. The fire threatened the communities of Santa Clarita, Glendale, Olive View, Lake View Terrace, Sunland-Tujunga, Shadow Hills, Sylmar, Pacoima, Lopez Canyon, and Kagel Canyon, as well as the Olive View–UCLA Medical Center. During the wildfire, 115,000 residents were forced to evacuate their homes.

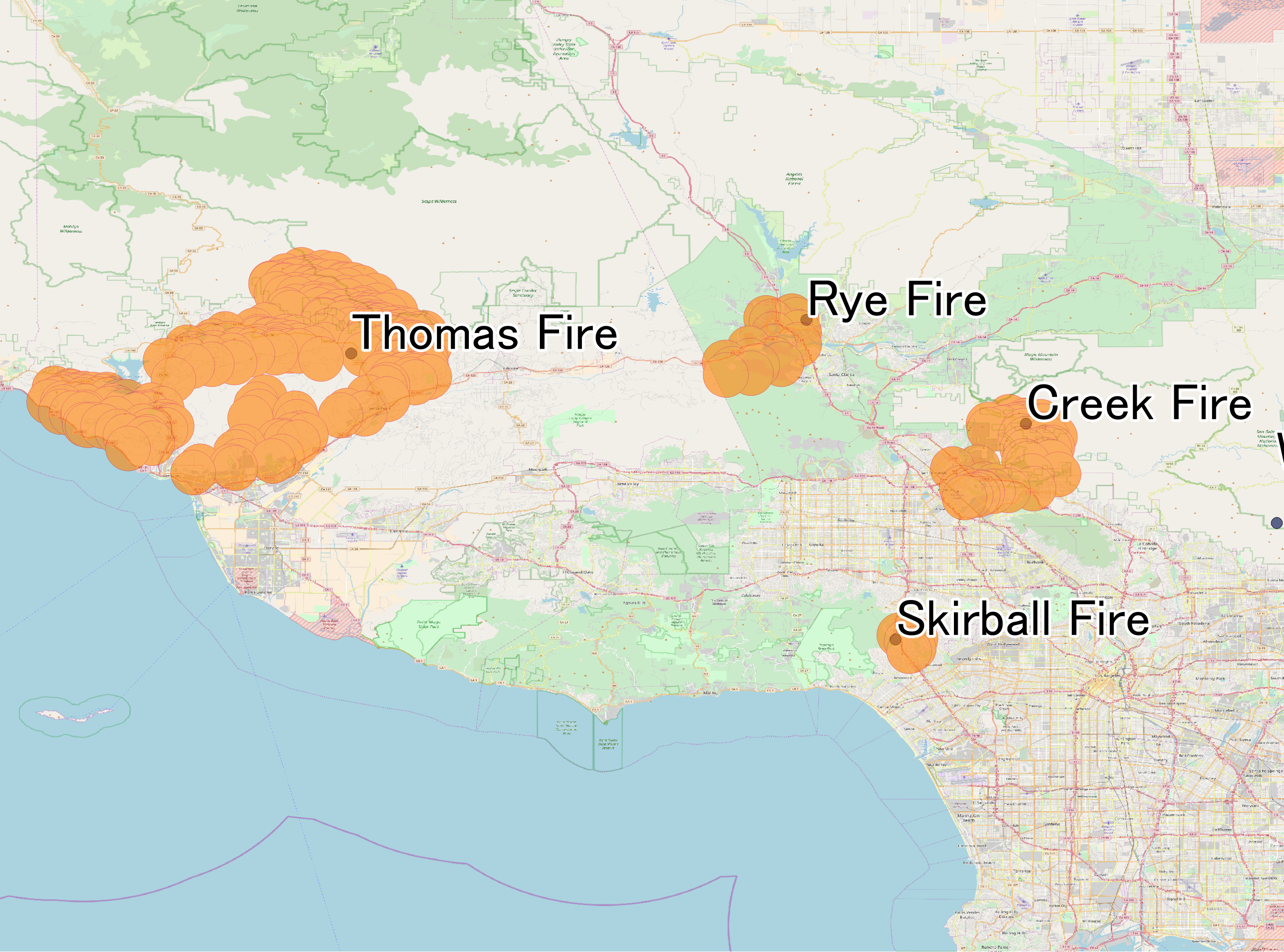
Map of the Creek Fire and adjacent fires

Location of the Creek Fire

== Events ==
The Creek Fire was reported on December 5, 2017, at 3:44 AM PST, on Kagel Canyon Road, north of Los Angeles. By the afternoon, the fire had jumped Interstate 210 and moved into the Shadow Hills neighborhood, traveling an estimated 15 miles from its starting point in Kagel Canyon and threatening ranches in the area. By the end of the day, a barn in Rancho Padilla burned, killing 30 horses that were trapped inside. The city government of Los Angeles and state governor Jerry Brown declared a state of emergency, due to the Creek Fire and other fires in the area.

By December 6, the Creek Fire had destroyed 15 structures, including 5 homes, and damaged 15 structures, including 8 homes. Mandatory evacuations were put in place for areas north and south of State Route 210 and portions of Kagel Canyon, Lakeview Terrace, Sunland, Sylmar, Pacoima, Lopez Canyon, and Shadow Hills. 115,000 residents were forced to evacuate. Three firefighters were injured. One was injured by a propane tank explosion, and another one was injured when a bulldozer rolled over.

The rugged, steep terrain where the fire was burning, as well as the heavy Santa Ana winds, caused the fire to grow quickly, and also challenged firefighters. On the evening of December 7, all evacuation orders were lifted except for Limekiln Canyon. The fire had grown to 15,323 acres (62.01 km^{2}) by December 8, as Santa Ana winds continued to pick up across the San Gabriel Mountains, continuing to impact the control of the fire. The Angeles National Forest declared its fire danger level at "extreme" and put in place fire restrictions, including no open flames, no campfires, no BBQs, or grilling. The area of Limekiln Canyon, including Santiago Estates, remained evacuated and closed to the public. Schools remained closed in the area. Later on December 8, the Creek Fire increased in size to 15,619 acres (63.21 km^{2}), while containment of the fire also increased to 70%.

By December 9, 123 buildings had been destroyed, including 60 homes. Evacuations orders were ended and the American Red Cross began providing equipment to people returning to their destroyed homes. Fire crews continue to monitor the area. Smoke advisories were declared in the San Fernando Valley and the coastal areas of the county due to the Creek Fire and Skirball Fire. CAL FIRE transferred management responsibilities to the Angeles National Forest, Los Angeles County Fire Department, and Los Angeles Fire Department on December 11.

On December 23, the fire was at 15,619 acres (63 km^{2}) and was 98% contained. Crews continued to reinforce containment lines while patrolling, as well as extinguishing hot spots, mopping up, and implementing suppression repair. On December 27, the Creek Fire was still at 98% containment.

On January 9, 2018, a winter storm dropped heavy rainfall across the region, extinguishing the Creek Fire and triggering mudslides in areas heavily burned by the December 2017 wildfires. However, by 10:00 AM PST that day, mandatory evacuations for residents near the Creek Fire burn area were lifted, after the worst of the mudslide threat for the area had passed.

== Investigation ==
Soon after the Creek Fire ignited, authorities began investigation the cause of the wildfire. Locals reported that around the time that the Creek Fire had started, early on December 5, a steel power pylon near Sylmar had snapped and sent sparks flying, which ignited the Creek Fire. However, the Los Angeles Department of Water and Power, which owns the power lines in the area, denied that there had been any breaks in the power line, though their logs indicated that the power lines were experiencing trouble at around 4:40 AM PST.

== Containment progress ==
Fire containment status
Date	Acres burned	Containment
Dec 5	2,500	
Dec 6	12,605	
Dec 7	15,323	
Dec 8	15,619	
Dec 9	15,619	
Dec 10	15,619	
Dec 11–31	15,619	
---	---	---
Jan 9	15,619	

== See also ==
- 2017 California wildfires
  - December 2017 Southern California wildfires
- Sayre Fire
- Hurst Fire
