= Rye Fire =

2017 wildfire in Southern California

- Part of the December 2017 Southern California wildfires
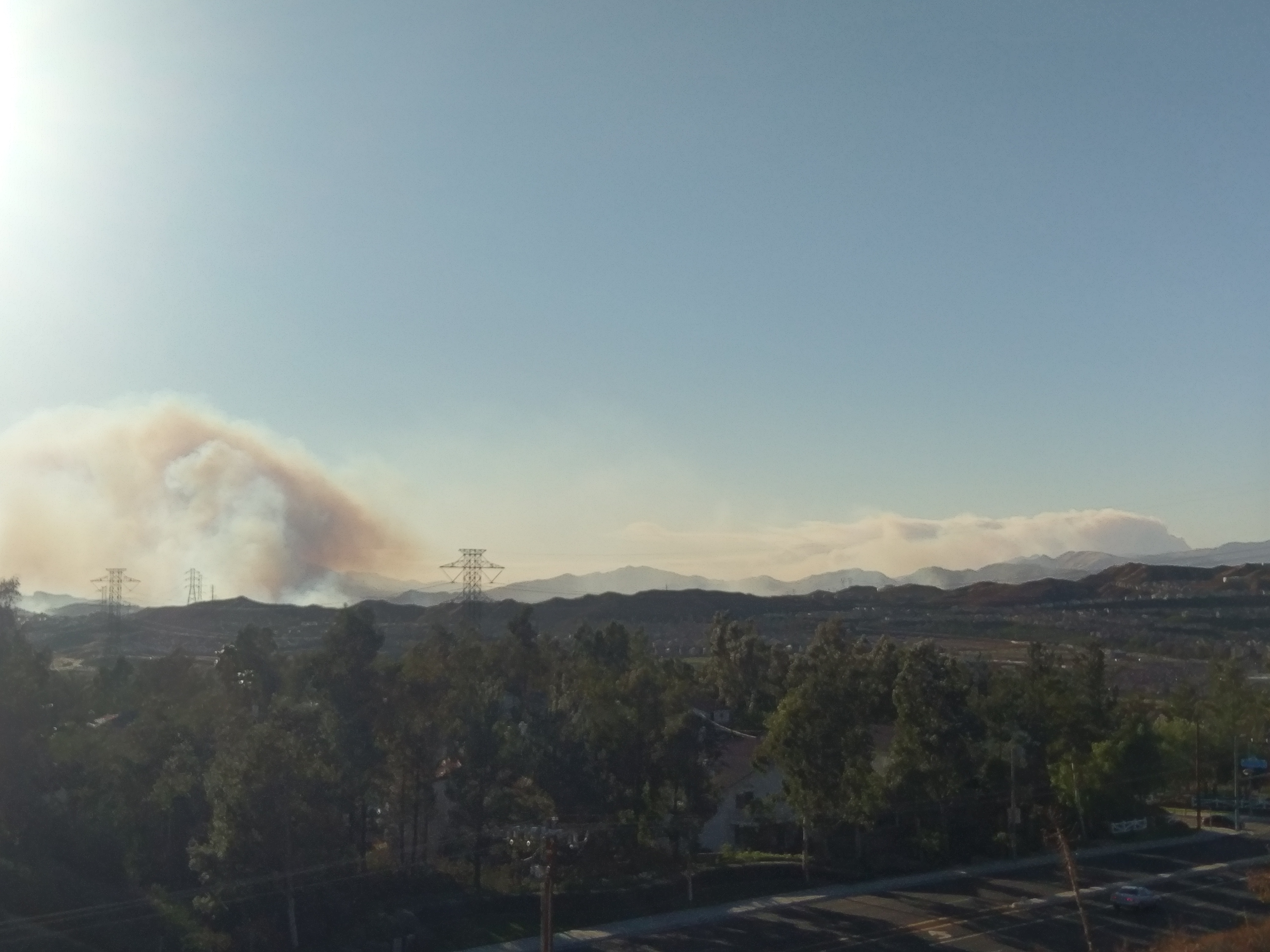
- Smoke from both the Rye Fire (left) and Thomas Fire (right), as seen on December 5 from Santa Clarita, California
- Date: December 5, 2017 –; December 12, 2017
- Location: Santa Clarita, California, United States
- Coordinates: 34.45283°N 118.58188°W

Statistics
- Burned area: 6,049 acres (24 km^{2})

Impacts
- Deaths: None
- Injuries: 1 firefighter
- Structures lost: 6 destroyed 3 damaged

Ignition
- Cause: Under investigation

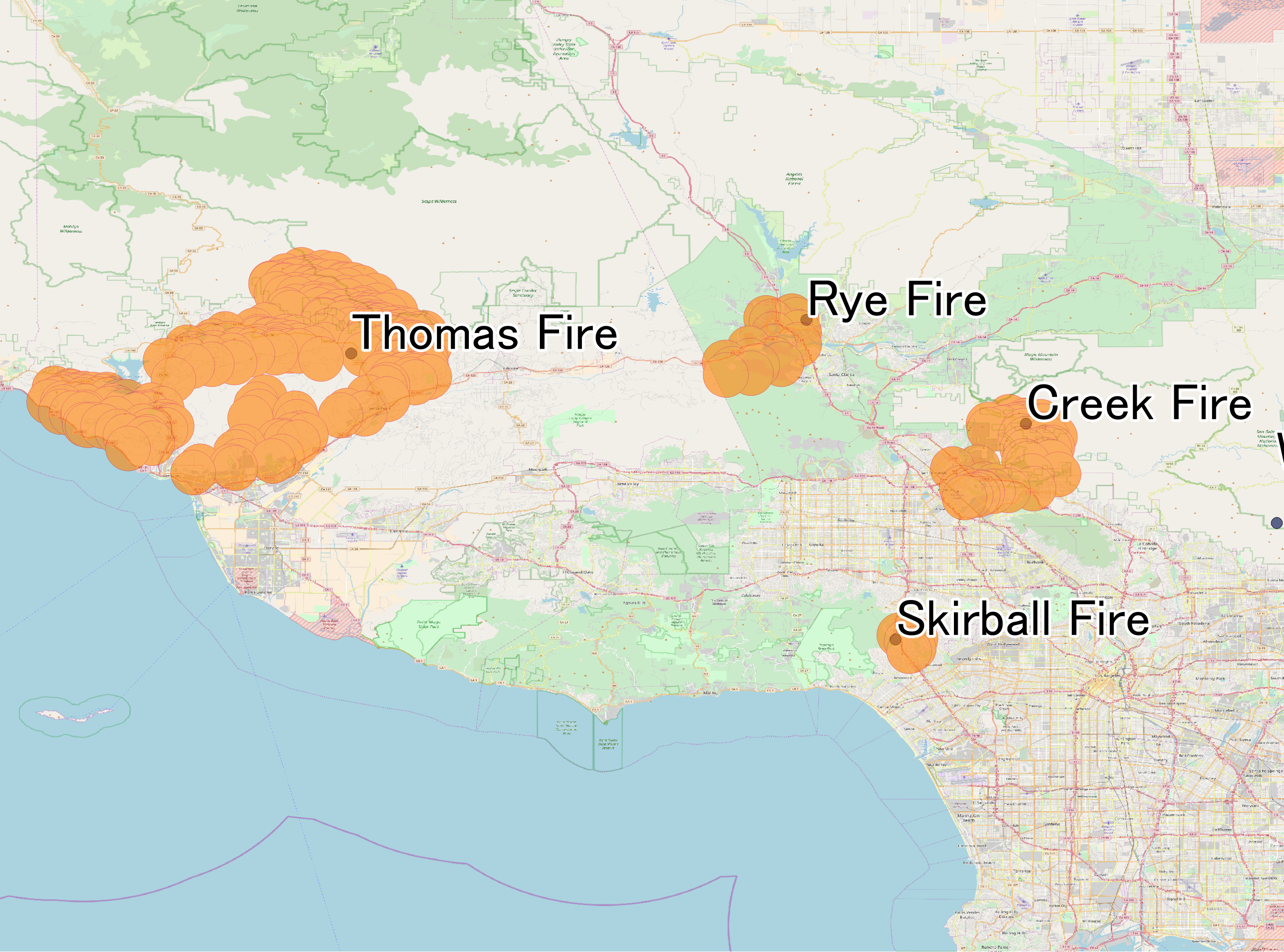
Map of the Rye Fire and adjacent fires

Location of the Rye Fire

The Rye Fire was a wildfire that burned in Santa Clarita, California, in the United States, and one of multiple wildfires that broke out across Southern California in December 2017. The fire threatened over 5,000 structures, including Six Flags Magic Mountain, threatened the city of Santa Clarita and impacted traffic on Interstate 5. The Rye Fire burned a total of 6,049 acres (24.48 km^{2}), before it was fully contained on December 12, 2017. The fire destroyed six buildings, including minor structures located at the Peter J. Pitchess Detention Center.

== Events ==
The Rye Fire, was reported as a small brush fire at 9:32 AM PST on December 5, 2017, on Rye Canyon Loop in Santa Clarita, California. The fire was named for Rye Canyon Loop where it originated. That day, Highway 5 was closed in both directions and Rye Canyon Loop was evacuated, as well as the entire community of Westridge, totaling 1,300 homes. Rancho Pico Junior High and West Ranch High schools in the William S. Hart Union High School District were evacuated to College of the Canyons and Saugus Union School District evacuated West Creek Academy. Valencia High School was also evacuated. The fire interrupted production of television programs S.W.A.T. and Westworld. Electricity was also interrupted for over 2,000 customers.

School resumed on Wednesday, December 6, 2017 after evacuation orders for the Westridge Valencia neighborhood were lifted the evening of December 5. However, Simi Valley Unified School District closed all schools on Wednesday due to poor air quality. The fire continued to grow and by December 7, 2017, one structure had been destroyed and California Department of Forestry and Fire Protection (Cal Fire) has expressed concern about strong offshore winds which could cause the fire to grow. Power went out for over 8,880 customers. One firefighter was injured and airlifted to a burn center. Overnight, no fire growth was observed by Cal Fire and firefighters continued to mop up the fire and maintain perimeters.

By the morning of December 8, 2017, power had been restored to all customers in the area. On December 9, 2017, firefighters continued to mop up the area and keep the fire within the perimeter, bolstering containment lines. During an evaluation of the Peter J. Pitchess Detention Center, they discovered that minor structures were damaged or destroyed, bringing the total destroyed buildings to six and damaged structures to three. All evacuation orders were lifted by December 9, 2017. The Rye Fire burned 6,049 acres (24.48 km^{2}), and threatened 5,460 structures. On December 12, 2017, the Rye Fire was fully contained, with no further increases in size. At its height, over 900 fire personnel fought the Rye Fire. The cause of the fire remains under investigation.

== See also ==
- 2017 California wildfires
  - December 2017 Southern California wildfires
- October 2007 California wildfires
- Santa Ana winds
