= Skirball Fire =

2017 wildfire in Southern California

- Part of the December 2017 Southern California wildfires
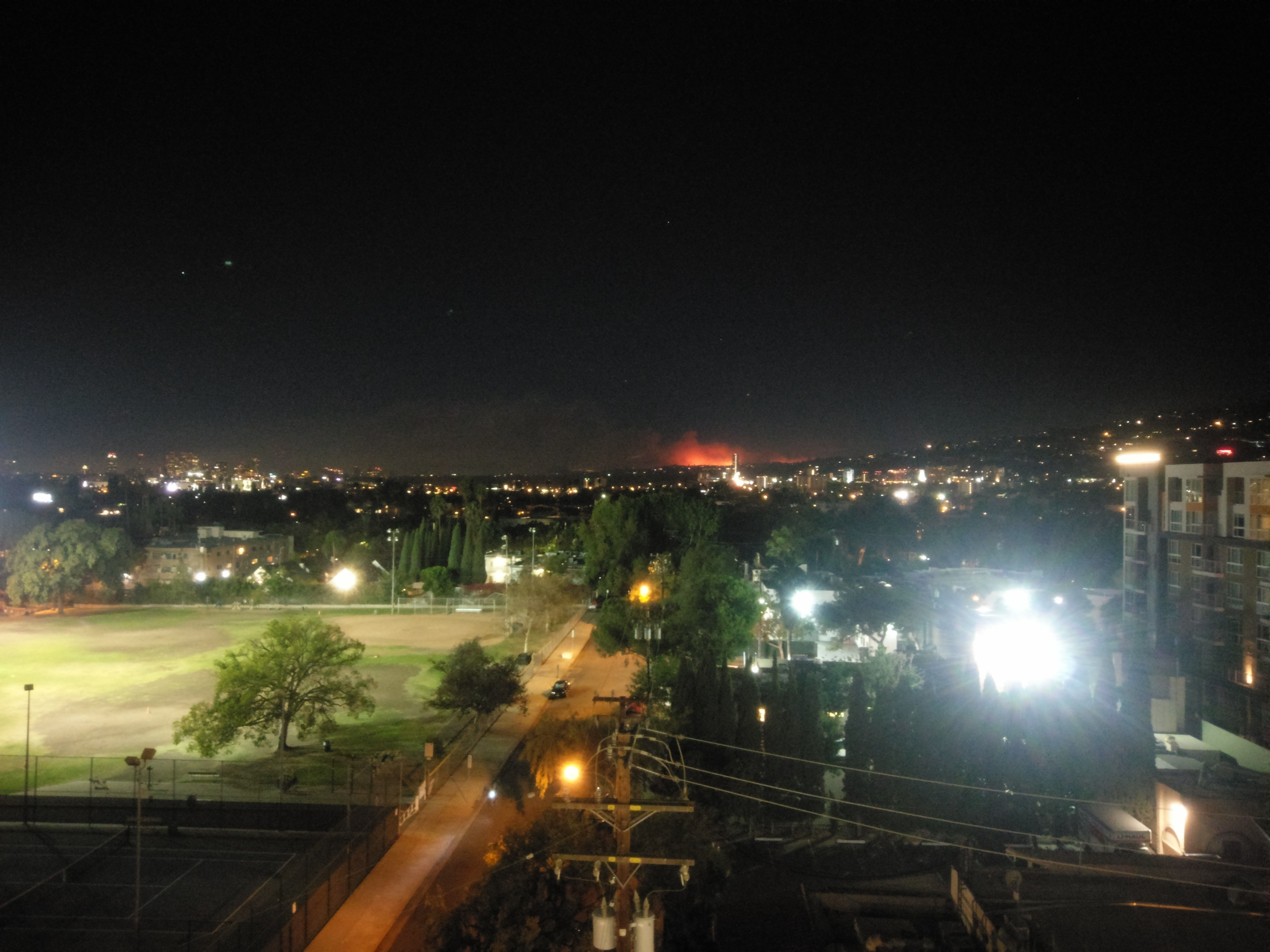
- A shot of the Skirball Fire from West Hollywood, shortly after its ignition
- Date: December 6, 2017 –; December 15, 2017
- Location: Bel Air, Los Angeles County, California

Statistics
- Burned area: 422 acres (171 ha)

Impacts
- Deaths: None reported
- Injuries: 3 firefighters
- Structures lost: 6

Ignition
- Cause: Illegal cooking fire

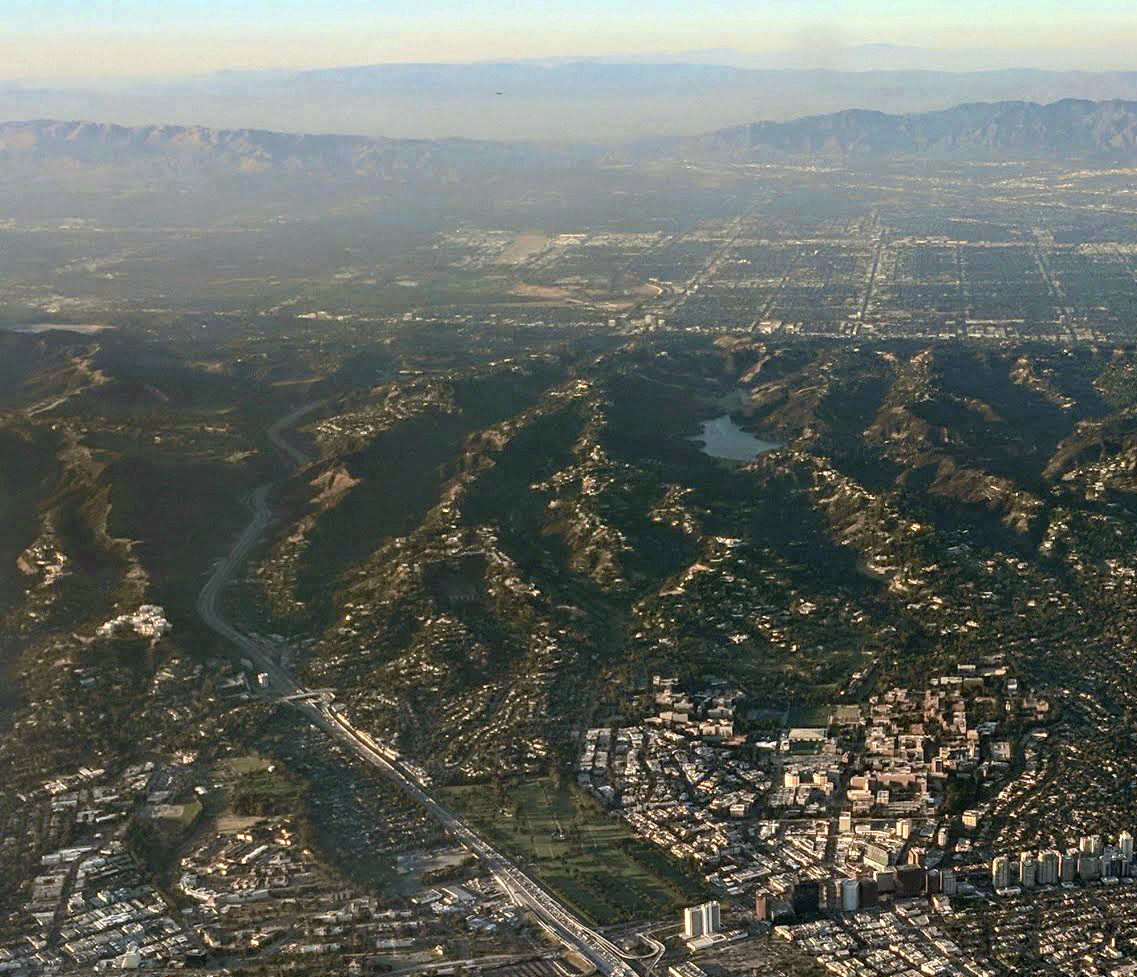
Late afternoon aerial view from October 2017, showing the hilly Bel Air neighborhood, immediately north of University of California, Los Angeles along I-405, where the Skirball Fire is burning in early December 2017. The lake is Stone Canyon Reservoir.

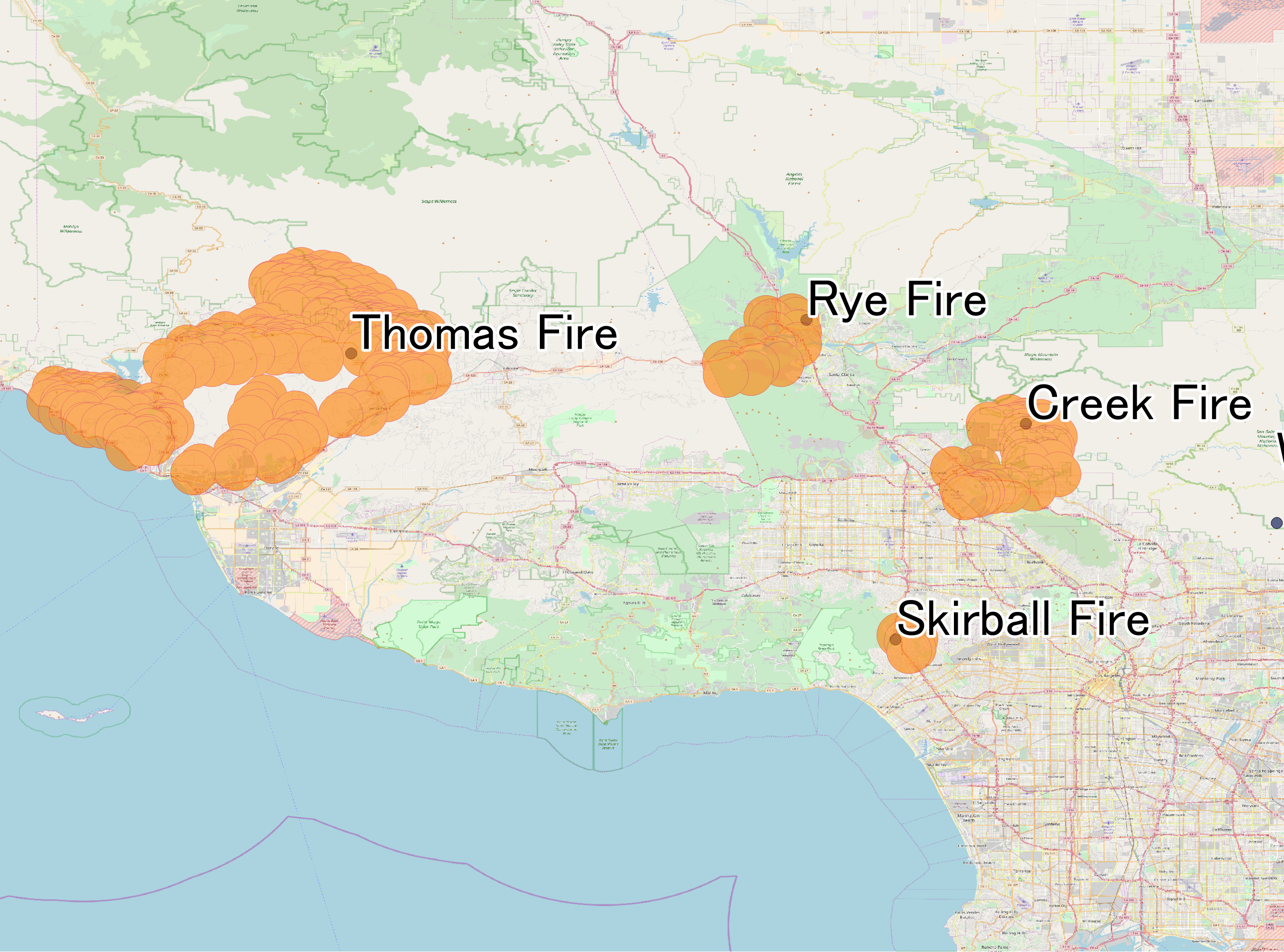
Map of the Skirball Fire and adjacent fires

Location of the Skirball Fire

The Skirball Fire was a wildfire that burned in the Bel Air neighborhood of Los Angeles, California, United States, and one of multiple wildfires that broke out across Southern California in December 2017. The fire burned 422 acres (171 ha) of land on the slopes of the Sepulveda Pass on its east or Bel Air side, causing the closure of Interstate 405 (as well as the parallel Sepulveda Boulevard), a major traffic artery in the city. The Skirball Cultural Center, Bel-Air Country Club, Getty Center, Santa Monica-Malibu Unified School District, and various private schools were closed as a result of the fire. Classes were cancelled at the University of California, Los Angeles (UCLA) and Santa Monica College, while Mount Saint Mary's University evacuated from its Brentwood campus to its downtown Los Angeles location. The fire destroyed six structures and damaged 12. On December 10, at about 1 p.m. PST, all evacuation orders and road closures for the Skirball Fire were lifted, as containment of the wildfire increased to 85%. Late on December 15, it was reported that the Skirball Fire had been 100% contained, at 422 acres (171 ha).

On December 12, the Los Angeles Fire Department reported that the fire had been sparked by an illegal cooking fire at a homeless encampment within the pass.

During the Skirball Fire, firefighters in the LAFD employed drones to help them combat wildfires for the first time.

This fire threatened the home of Frank Luntz, the Republican political consultant who had previously sought to downplay the severity of the climate change crisis. He later cited this experience as an "example of the climate crisis made personal," and shifted his viewpoint to advocate for climate action.

== Containment progress ==
Fire containment status
Date	Acres burned	Containment
Dec 6	150	
Dec 7	422	
Dec 10	422	
Dec 11–13	422	
---	---	---
Dec 15	422	

== See also ==
- 2017 California wildfires
  - December 2017 Southern California wildfires
- Bel Air Fire (1961)
- October 2007 California wildfires
- Sayre Fire
