= Kagel Canyon, California =

Unincorporated community in California, United States

- Unincorporated community
- Location within California Location within the United States
- Coordinates: 34°17′18″N 118°22′34″W
- Country: United States
- State: California
- County: Los Angeles
- Elevation: 1,283 ft (391 m)
- Time zone: UTC−8 (Pacific (PST))
  - Summer (DST): UTC−7 (PDT)
- Area codes: 747 and 818
- GNIS feature ID: 2519100
- Website: www.kagelcanyon.com

Kagel Canyon is a rural unincorporated community in Los Angeles County, California, United States.

== Geography ==
The community and canyon are located in the southwestern San Gabriel Mountains foothills within the Angeles National Forest. It is located east of and above the City of San Fernando, and north above the community of Lakeview Terrace.

The area is above the northeastern San Fernando Valley and overlooks the western Crescenta Valley.

In 2000, Kagel Canyon and the neighboring Lopez Canyon community had a combined population of 697.
