= December 2017 Southern California wildfires =

2017 wildfires in Southern California

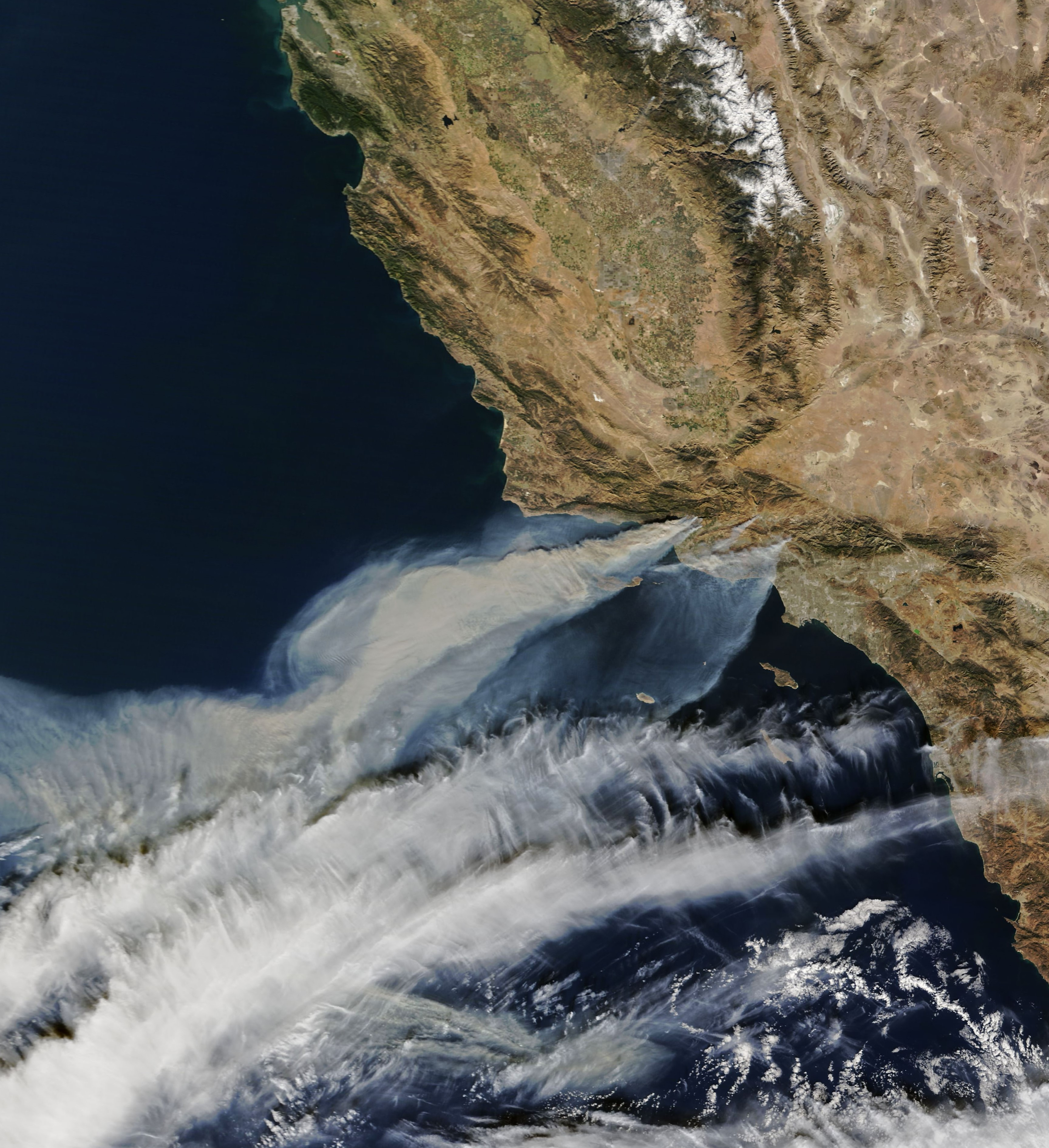
1 / Thomas Fire	2 / Rye Fire	3 / Creek Fire
Satellite image of the smoke from the Thomas Fire and 2 smaller wildfires, on December 5, 2017.
- Date: December 4, 2017 – March 22, 2018
- Location: Southern California

Statistics
- Total fires: 29
- Total area: 307,953 acres (124,624 ha; 481.177 sq mi; 1,246.24 km^{2})

Impacts
- Deaths: 1 firefighter, 1 civilian
- Injuries: 12 firefighters, 7 civilians
- Structures destroyed: 1,355 structures
- Cost: ~$3.5 billion (2018 USD)

Ignition
- Cause: Downed power lines, burning debris, illegal cooking fire, others unknown

A series of 29 wildfires ignited across Southern California in December 2017. Six of the fires became significant wildfires, and led to widespread evacuations and property losses. The wildfires burned over 307,900 acres (1,246 km^{2}), and caused traffic disruptions, school closures, hazardous air conditions, and power outages; over 230,000 people were forced to evacuate. The largest of the wildfires was the Thomas Fire, which grew to 281,893 acres (1,140.78 km^{2}), and became the largest wildfire in modern California history, until it was surpassed by the Ranch Fire in the Mendocino Complex, in the following year.

On December 5, Governor Jerry Brown declared a state of emergency for Ventura and Los Angeles Counties, followed by San Diego County on December 7; U.S. President Donald Trump subsequently declared a State of Emergency for California on December 8.

This swarm of wildfires was exacerbated by unusually powerful and long-lasting Santa Ana winds, as well as large amounts of dry vegetation, due to a then-far unusually dry rainy season thus far. They also occurred at the end of an unusually active and destructive wildfire season; the fires cost at least $3.5 billion (2018 USD) in damages, including $2.2 billion in insured losses and $300 million in fire suppression costs.

== Wildfire maps ==
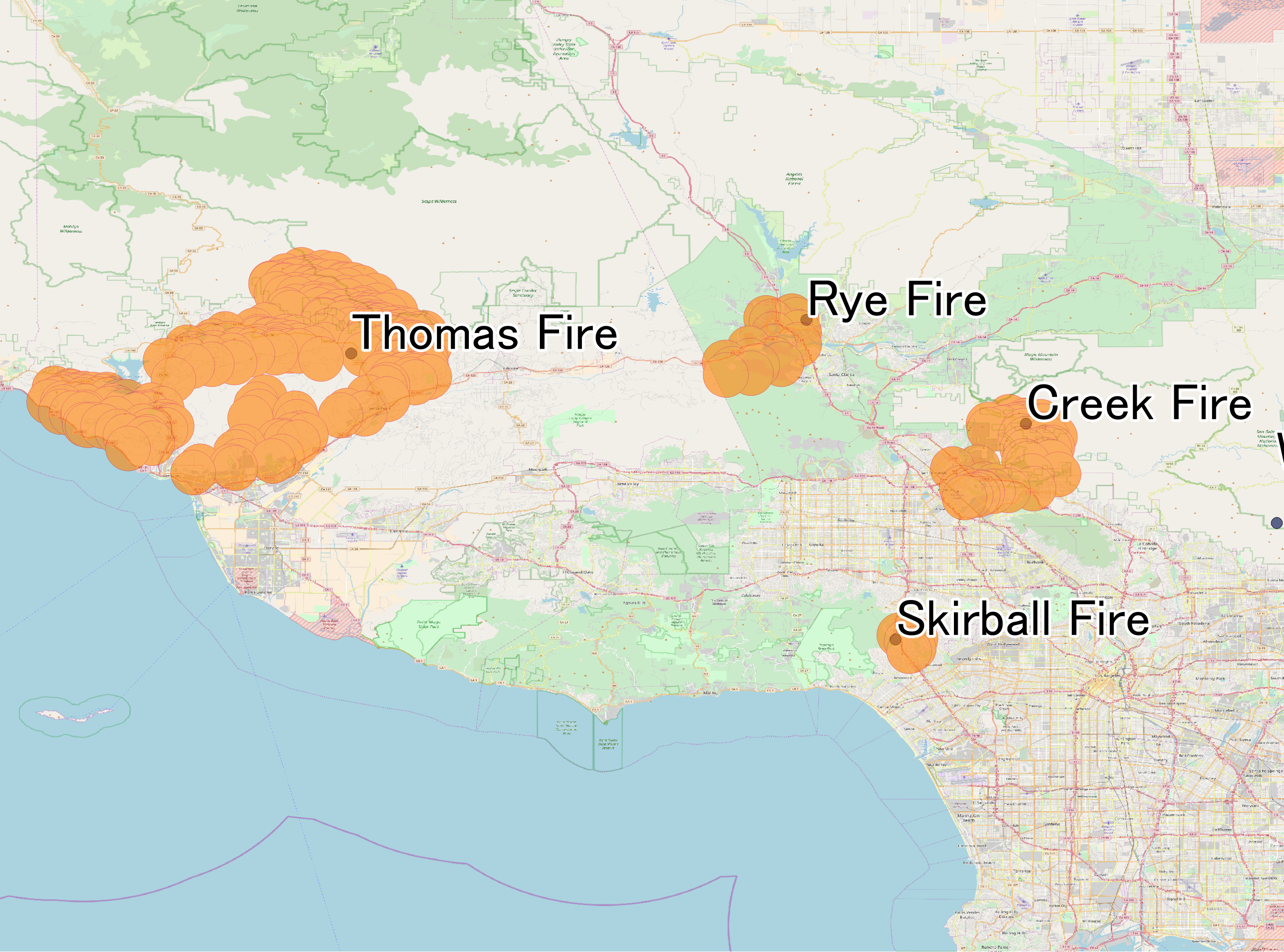
Map of the Thomas Fire and adjacent fires.

These maps depict the location and burn areas of some of the major wildfires.

Location of the California wildfires in December 2017.

== Wildfires ==
Name	County	Acres	Start date	Containment date	Cause	Notes	References
Riverdale	Los Angeles	40	December 4, 2017	December 6, 2017			
Thomas	Ventura	281,893	December 4, 2017	January 12, 2018		Second-largest wildfire in modern California history: 1,063 structures destroyed, 280 buildings damaged, 2 firefighters injured, 1 firefighter and 1 civilian killed	
Creek	Los Angeles	15,619	December 5, 2017	January 9, 2018		123 buildings destroyed, 81 buildings damaged, 3 firefighters injured	
Rye	Los Angeles	6,049	December 5, 2017	December 12, 2017		6 buildings destroyed, 3 structures damaged, 1 firefighter injured	
Meyers	San Bernardino	34	December 5, 2017	December 6, 2017	Fallen overhead power line		
Little Mountain	San Bernardino	260	December 5, 2017	December 7, 2017	Illegal cooking fire	3 injuries	
Paper	San Bernardino	2.5	December 5, 2017	December 6, 2017	Burning debris from a semi-trailer truck		
Skirball	Los Angeles	422	December 6, 2017	December 15, 2017	Illegal cooking fire	6 structures destroyed, 12 structures damaged, 3 firefighters injured	
Lilac	San Diego	4,100	December 7, 2017	December 16, 2017		157 structures destroyed, 64 structures damaged, 3 firefighters and 4 civilians injured	
Liberty	Riverside	300	December 7, 2017	December 9, 2017		7 structures destroyed	
Sweetwater	San Diego	8	December 8, 2017	December 8, 2017			
El Sereno	Los Angeles	6	December 8, 2017	December 8, 2017			
Longhorn	Riverside	19.5	December 13, 2017	December 13, 2017			
Coast	Santa Barbara	14	December 14, 2017	December 15, 2017			
Range 219	San Diego	100	December 15, 2017	December 15, 2017			
Drum	Santa Barbara	14	December 16, 2017	December 17, 2017			
Riverbottom	Riverside	45	December 21, 2017	December 24, 2017		2 structures damaged	
Oro Vista	Los Angeles	13	December 28, 2017	December 29, 2017			

=== Thomas Fire ===
The first report of the fire was at 6:26 p.m. on December 4 just north of Santa Paula, near Steckel Park and Thomas Aquinas College. Fanned by Santa Ana winds, over the next few hours it rushed 12 miles (19 km) across rural backcountry into the city of Ventura, burning close to 500 homes and consuming 50,000 acres (200 km^{2}). Over the next days, it advanced toward Ojai and had jumped Highway 33 and the Ventura River into the Rincon Oil Field area. By December 8, the Thomas Fire had grown to 143,000 acres (580 km^{2}) with only 10% containment, and fire officials estimated that the fire had cost at least $17 million to fight. By the evening of December 10, the Thomas Fire had reached 230,000 acres (930 km^{2}) in size, becoming the fifth largest wildfire in modern California history, and the largest wildfire recorded in California during the month of December. There were multiple periods of time when the fire was advancing at a rate of over an acre a second. The Thomas Fire had also destroyed at least 794 structures while damaging 187 others, and cost at least $38.4 million to fight, becoming at least the 10th most destructive wildfire in California history. Early on December 11, the Thomas Fire had grown to 230,500 acres (933 km^{2}), while containment of the fire had increased to 15%. On December 13, the Thomas Fire's northwestern flank linked up with its southwestern flank, to the east of Carpinteria, enveloping an area containing Ojai and Lake Casitas. Early on December 16, the Thomas Fire reached a size of 259,000 acres (1,050 km^{2}), with 40% containment, surpassing the Rim Fire as California's third-largest wildfire. On December 19, the Thomas Fire reached 272,000 acres (1,100 km^{2}), with 55% containment, surpassing the burn area of the Rush Fire in California to become the second-largest wildfire in modern California history. During the evening of December 22, the Thomas Fire expanded further to 273,400 acres (1,106 km^{2}), with containment at 65%, surpassing the Cedar Fire of 2003 to become California's largest wildfire in modern history. On December 24, the Thomas Fire grew to 281,620 acres (1,139.7 km^{2}), after the fires from a back-burning operation completely merged into the Thomas Fire's northwestern flank, though containment of the wildfire also increased to 86%.

On January 8–9, 2018, a winter storm struck California, bringing heavy rain to Southern California, and prompting mandatory evacuations in parts of Los Angeles, Santa Barbara, and Ventura Counties, over potential mudslides in areas affected by wildfires. At least four inches (100 mm) of rain fell over the two-day period, causing several major mudflows.

On January 12, 2018, the U.S. Forest Service declared the Thomas Fire 100 percent contained, at 281,893 acres. Afterward, Los Pedros National Forest officials continued monitoring the burn area of the Thomas Fire for hotspots. On March 22, 2018, InciWeb declared the Thomas Fire to be inactive and ceased providing updates. On June 1, 2018, the Thomas Fire was officially declared to be out, after more than two months in which no hotspots were detected within the perimeter of the burn area.

=== Little Mountain Fire ===
On December 5, at 12:28 p.m. PST, a wildfire broke out near University Parkway and Varsity Avenue in San Bernardino, just off Interstate 215. The wildfire quickly grew to 100 acres (40 ha), causing the closure of Interstate 215, and triggering evacuation orders for residents in the area. Students at Shandin Hills Middle School, on Little Mountain Drive, were also evacuated to Holcomb Elementary School. At 6:30 p.m. PST on the same day, the road closure and the evacuation orders had been lifted, though the Little Mountain area still remained closed off. On December 6, the Little Mountain Fire grew to 260 acres (110 ha), while firefighters worked to contain the flames. Firefighters made progress on the fire that day, due to the weakening of the Santa Ana winds in the area beginning on the evening of December 5. During the evening of December 7, firefighters managed to extinguish the Little Mountain Fire, with no increase in acreage. Three civilians were burned by the fire, and were sent to a hospital for treatment. Three garages suffered minor damage, but no other structures were damaged by the fire. An investigation revealed that the fire was caused by an illegal cooking fire at a homeless camp.

=== Liberty Fire ===
The Liberty Fire was reported on December 7, at 1:14 p.m. PST, in Murrieta, in Riverside County. The Liberty Fire began as a vegetation fire. By the evening the Liberty Fire had grown to 300 acres (120 ha), with 10% containment. On the next day, with the improved weather conditions, firefighters made much more progress on the fire, bringing it to 90% containment. Late on December 9, the Liberty Fire was fully contained. Six structures and an outbuilding were destroyed by the fire.

=== Other wildfires ===
On December 7, a small brush fire broke out at Huntington Beach. The small brush fire burned 2 acres (0.81 ha) before it was fully contained on the same day, damaging a daycare center and a bank.

On December 7, two small brush fires broke out north of Buellton, in Santa Barbara County. The brush fires were collectively dubbed as the "Woodchopper Incident", with the first fire burning 5 acres (2.0 ha) and the second fire burning 4 acres (1.6 ha), before they were both contained later on the same day. The brush fires briefly caused the closure of Highway 101.

On December 8, at 9:30 a.m. PST, the Sweetwater Fire broke out in eastern San Diego County, south of Interstate 8 and just west of Japatul Valley Road, in Descanso. The wildfire burned about 8 acres (3.2 ha) of land, before it was fully brought under control about 4 hours later.

On December 8, sometime before 12:56 p.m. PST, a small brush fire broke out in the El Sereno neighborhood of Los Angeles. Firefighters quickly extinguished the fire in a little over an hour, after the fire had burned 6 acres (2.4 ha).

On December 8, around 2:15 p.m. PST, a small brush fire broke out in Otay Mesa Canyon, in southern San Diego County. Firefighters were able to quickly extinguish the flames.

Early on December 11, firefighters quickly put out two small fires in Ocean Beach, San Diego. At around 2:15 a.m. PST, firefighters put out a burning fence in the 4,400 block of Santa Cruz Avenue, before responding to another shed fire less than a mile away, on Muir Avenue at 2:30 a.m., which damaged an RV. Arson investigators believe that the two fires are connected.

On December 11, two wildfires ignited along Interstate 805 in southern San Diego. The first fire ignited near Route 54 and Interstate 805, which was quickly extinguished. The second fire ignited at 2:07 p.m. PST at Interstate 805, to the south of Mesa College. This fire triggered the closing of the right two northbound lanes of Interstate 805 (on the side of the fire), and the fire burned 0.5 acre (0.20 ha) before firefighters were able to stop its spread.

On December 13, a small brush fire broke out in Oxnard, near Highway 101, just after 7:50 AM PST. The fire reached a quarter acre in size, before it was quickly contained within an hour.

During the night of December 15, just before 10:10 p.m. PST, a small brush fire broke out near Otay Valley Road, near a trucking facility in Otay Mesa, in southern San Diego County. The fire burned about 20 vehicles, before it was brought under control.

On December 19, at 8:20 a.m. PST, a small fire broke out at San Diego International Airport, near the 4000 block of Pacific Highway. The fire burned through a storage area and a couple of businesses, before firefighters were able to get the fire under control several hours later. The fire is estimated to have caused at least $1 million in damage.

== Impacts ==
The December 2017 wildfires burned large areas of land and resulted in large property losses. In addition, the wildfires forced over 230,000 residents to evacuate their homes.

California Governor Jerry Brown declared a state of emergency in Ventura and Los Angeles Counties on December 5, and San Diego County on December 7. Los Angeles mayor Eric Garcetti declared a state of emergency for the city on December 6. U.S. President Donald Trump declared a state of emergency for the state of California on December 8.

== Deaths ==
One civilian death was recorded, a 70-year-old woman, Virginia Pesola, from Santa Paula. In addition, Cory Iverson, a firefighter, perished while fighting the Thomas Fire. "This is a tragic reminder of the dangerous work that our firefighters do every day," said Los Padres National Forest Supervisor Teresa Benson in a release. "The Thomas Fire has many unprecedented conditions and complexities that challenge the already demanding job of fire suppression."

== Aftermath ==
=== Mudslides ===
The wildfires destroyed many acres of forest. Due to the lack of trees' roots holding the soil together, the ground had reduced stability and was vulnerable to mud slides in heavy rain. In early January 2018, heavy rain was predicted for the American Southwest, causing flash flood watches and evacuations to be issued for portions of California affected by wildfires.

== See also ==
- 2017 California wildfires
  - October 2017 Northern California wildfires
- Blue Cut Fire (2016)
- May 2014 San Diego County wildfires
- October 2007 California wildfires
- Cedar Fire (2003)
- January 2025 Southern California wildfires
- Santiago Canyon Fire
- 2018 Southern California mudflows
