= List of killings by law enforcement officers in the United States, March 2024 =

This is a list of people reported killed by non-military law enforcement officers in the United States in March 2024, whether in the line of duty or not, and regardless of reason or method. The listing documents the occurrence of a death, making no implications regarding wrongdoing or justification on the part of the person killed or officer involved. Killings are arranged by date of the incident that caused death. Different death dates, if known, are noted in the description. The table below lists 124 people.

== March 2024 ==
Date	Name (age) of deceased	Race	Location	Description
2024-03-31	unidentified female	Unknown	Fayetteville, Georgia	A traffic stop escalated to a pursuit after the vehicle fled. Officers performed a PIT maneuver on the vehicle during a high speed pursuit, which caused the vehicle to veer off the road and crash. Two females in the vehicle died.
2024-03-31	unidentified female	Unknown	Fayetteville, Georgia	A traffic stop escalated to a pursuit after the vehicle fled. Officers performed a PIT maneuver on the vehicle during a high speed pursuit, which caused the vehicle to veer off the road and crash. Two females in the vehicle died.
2024-03-31	Justin Kitchen (33)	Unknown	Florence, Mississippi	After deputies responded to a report about a man threatening his family members, they arrived on the scene and encountered Kitchen. Kitchen allegedly opened fire at them before being fatally shot.
2024-03-31	Alan Jenks (38)	White	Spokane, Washington	Spokane Police responded to reports of a house fire and found a man began walking away from the area. When the police tried to detain him, he fired his gun and at least two police officers returned fire, striking him. The man was later identified as Alan Jenks.
2024-03-31	Matthew Flynn (34)	White	New Philadelphia, Ohio	Flynn jumped into a deputy's cruiser after he crashed a pickup truck into a house. He then struggled with the deputy who fired his service weapon. The deputy was injured and Flynn was killed by the gunfire.
2024-03-31	Luis Duran-Ruano (31)	Hispanic	Indianapolis, Indiana	Indianapolis Metropolitan Police were called about a man firing shots into the air. A brief pursuit occurred to stop Duran-Ruano from driving away from his home. After the pursuit, He got out of the vehicle and pointed a gun at his head. The SWAT team arrived and began communicating with him, an hour later, he began walking away and officers fired bean bag rounds at him. He then opened fire at the officers before being fatally shot.
2024-03-31	Kenneth Sharp (20)	Black	Richmond, Virginia	Richmond police officers responded to a report about a man banging on the hood of a car who seemed to be armed. They encountered Sharp exiting the car with an AR-Style Rifle when they arrived. Officers then retreated and fatally wounded Sharp.
2024-03-31	Leo Dorch (59)	Black	Kansas City, Missouri	KCPD officers encountered Dorch, who was allegedly on a street in front of a house armed with a gun. Police tried to persuade Dorch for several minutes to disarm himself. Dorch was then fatally shot when he allegedly pointed his gun in the direction of the KCPD officers.
2024-03-30	Andrew Farnham (60)	Unknown	San Carlos, California	
2024-03-30	Adrian Agustin Pilar	Hispanic	East Los Angeles, California	
2024-03-30	Christopher Reever (32)	Unknown	Gladstone, Missouri	Two Clay County deputies and one Gladstone Police officer shot and killed the man during a traffic stop during unknown circumstances. A firearm was recovered from the scene.
2024-03-30	Leandro Francisco Ledea Chong (34)	Latino	Homestead, Florida	Chong was fatally shot by Homestead Police in a residential area during unknown circumstances.
2024-03-29	Anthony Wade (34)	Black	Sparks, Nevada	Wade first shot a Sparks police officer during a traffic stop and then a foot chase occurred. He got into a resident's house and was driven out. He then got into another house and opened fire at officers, another 2 officers were shot during the shootout. He then broke into the third house and barricaded himself inside. He was shot by SWAT officers after firing at them. Officers found Wade dead several hours later.
2024-03-29	Adrian Muniz (40)	Hispanic	Chadron, Nebraska	Muniz, who was a suspect in a stolen car investigation, was fatally shot by Chadron Police at a gas station after he allegedly exited a vehicle with a firearm.
2024-03-29	Donald Hegel (43)	White	Deer Park, Washington	The man was shot and killed by Stevens County Deputies after a standoff at a residence.
2024-03-29	Robert Sayen (67)	White	Mobile, Alabama	A officer struck and killed Sayen, who is riding a motorcycle. Officials stated that the malfunctioning traffic lights could be the main cause of the accident.
2024-03-28	Robert Prince (38)	White	College Park, Georgia	While Clayton County Police were investigating a sexual assault, someone spotted Prince's vehicle driving past the scene. After Police stopped the vehicle at a Valero gas station, Prince allegedly fired shots at the officers and was then shot himself.
2024-03-27	Win Rozario (19)	South Asian	Queens, New York	Rozario died after he was fatally shot by officers from the NYPD at his Ozone Park residence. Rozario's parents called the police because their son was going through a mental health crisis inside their residence. After officers arrived, Rozario picked up a pair of scissors. Officers tased Rozario and then shot him at least five times, within three minutes of entering the home.
2024-03-27	Ian Tilton (28)	White	Upper Marlboro, Maryland	Tilton was shot by an off-duty Metropolitan Police Department Lieutenant after lunging a knife at a Prince George's County Police officer. He was pronounced deceased at University of Maryland Capital Regional Hospital.
2024-03-27	David Genereux	Unknown	Colton, California	
2024-03-27	Michelle Arrais (50)	White	Pacifica, California	
2024-03-26	Bill Osterhout (68)	White	Haysville, Kansas	
2024-03-26	Eric Bennett (28)	White	Clio, Michigan	
2024-03-26	Scott William Thompson (57)	Unknown	Fullerton, California	
2024-03-25	Damon Stern (50)	Black	Reading, Pennsylvania	
2024-03-25	Evet Michelle Tower (45)	Black	Tuscaloosa, Alabama	
2024-03-24	John Piazza (41)	Unknown	Waterloo, Iowa	
2024-03-24	Jesus Rodriguez (30)	Hispanic	Amarillo, Texas	
2024-03-24	Dominique Durham (37)	Black	Indianapolis, Indiana	Durham died after he was fatally shot by two off-duty IMPD officers at a bar on Indianapolis's east side. Durham was allegedly armed with a gun.
2024-03-23	Emmanuel Perez Becerra (19)	Latino	Sunnyvale, California	
2024-03-23	Gary Allen Johnson	White	Summersville, West Virginia	
2024-03-23	Christopher Gilmore (38)	White	Rio Linda, California	Sacramento County deputies fatally shot man after he allegedly lunged at deputies with a knife.
2024-03-23	Rashawn Johnson (36)	Unknown	Snellville, Georgia	
2024-03-23	Keith Vinyard (52)	White	Hesperia, California	
2024-03-23	Marcus Andrew Eaddy (29)	Black	Tallapoosa, Georgia	
2024-03-22	Barry Chick Jr. (39)	Unknown	Brewer, Maine	
2024-03-22	Justin Giordon (41)	White	Warren County, Pennsylvania	
2024-03-21	Joseph Altamirano (61)	White	Soledad, California	In Soledad state prison, Altamirano struck a correctional officer with his fist. The officers then use pepper spray on him and restrained him. He eventually died at a hospital.
2024-03-21	unidentified person	Unknown	Mesa, Arizona	
2024-03-21	Laquanza Young (52)	Black	Scottsdale, Arizona	Young was driving a stolen vehicle, and was shot dead after firing his gun at two officers during a traffic stop.
2024-03-21	Santonio Lee (45)	Black	Norfolk, Virginia	
2024-03-21	Zeff Rocco (39)	Hispanic	Los Angeles, California	
2024-03-21	Karl Chludinsky (46)	White	Fort Lauderdale, Florida	
2024-03-21	Dexter Reed (26)	Black	Chicago, Illinois	Reed died after pulling a gun and firing at Chicago Police following a traffic stop in the Garfield Park neighborhood. On February 6, 2025, Reed's family accepted a $1.25M settlement from the city of Chicago, which awaits approval from the Chicago City Council.
2024-03-21	Kadarius Smith (17)	Black	Leland, Mississippi	A Leland patrol vehicle struck and killed Smith as he was running back to his residence after police were called to a house he was in.
2024-03-20	Michael P. O'Neal (39)	White	Summerville, South Carolina	Off-duty Summerville police officer Anthony DeLustro fatally shot O'Neal in the parking lot of a Chick-fil-A after a fight. DeLustro was later charged with murder.
2024-03-20	Gabriel Keith Platz (18)	White	Bend, Oregon	
2024-03-19	Russell Q. Francis Jr. (39)	White	Lafayette, Louisiana	
2024-03-19	Jose Acosta (40)	Hispanic	Long Beach, California	In Paramount, a woman called police to report that the father of her children had violated a restraining order by showing up at her residence. When LASD encountered the man in Long Beach, he allegedly backed his vehicle into a patrol car, then exited the vehicle with a knife. Deputies then fatally shot the man.
2024-03-19	Bryan Malinowski (53)	White	Little Rock, Arkansas	ATF agents served a search warrant on the home of Malinowski, an executive at Clinton National Airport who was being investigated for selling guns without a dealer's license. During the warrant Malinowski allegedly fired at federal agents, who returned fire and shot Malinowski in the head. He was hospitalized and died two days later.
2024-03-19	Mariah Voight (32)	Hispanic	Albuquerque, New Mexico	Police found a stolen vehicle occupied by Voight and a man. Voight left the car and ran, while the man stayed and was arrested. Police searched for Voight for two hours before finding her in a shed, at which point officers shot her believing she was holding a gun. Voight was carrying a smartphone.
2024-03-19	unidentified male	Unknown	Port Orange, Florida	
2024-03-19	Miguel Agustin Nava Gomez (31)	Hispanic	Campbell, California	
2024-03-18	Richard Wilkinson (32)	White	Coldwater, Michigan	Michigan State police emergency support team fatally shot Wilkinson while serving an arrest warrant after Wilkinson confronted them with an AR-style rifle.
2024-03-18	Zoey Starr Heaviland (15)	White	Stock Island, Florida	Deputies responded to a report that a suicidal girl had stolen a gun and walked to a remote location of Stock Island. When deputies found her, the girl pointed the firearm at herself before allegedly pointing it at deputies.
2024-03-18	unidentified male (38)	Unknown	Monticello, Kentucky	
2024-03-18	Lopeti Tanuvasa Aiolupotea-Magalei (40)	Native Hawaiian and Pacific Islander	Tacoma, Washington	
2024-03-18	Rocky I. Dupin (38)	White	Decatur, Illinois	Dupin was suspected of being involved in an armed robbery at a discount store in Decatur. He was later spotted by two officers, who exited their patrol vehicle and ordered Dupin at gunpoint to get on the ground. Dupin initially complied with their orders, but then stood up and took out what appeared to be a gun. He was then shot and killed by the two officers.
2024-03-18	Nathan Scott (20)	Unknown	New York City, New York	According to NYPD officers, the suspect was seen shooting at two people in Brooklyn with a handgun. Officers returned fire, shooting the suspect several times, killing him. A 19-year-old was also taken into custody for questioning regarding the incident.
2024-03-17	Inyerman Jose Munoz (39)	Hispanic	Spring, Texas	
2024-03-17	Antwoina Carter (26)	Black	Cleveland, Ohio	While Cleveland Police officers were responding to a call, two vehicles sped by. When an unknown person fired shots from one of the vehicles, the officers returned fire, causing one of the vehicles to crash. Shortly afterwards, Carter was discovered outside the vehicle and was taken to University Hospital where she was pronounced dead. The other vehicle sped away.
2024-03-17	Foueti Afeaki (33)	Pacific Islander	Taylorsville, Utah	Police responded to a domestic violence call near Taylorsville's border with Kearns and encountered Afeaki in a garage. Police shot and killed Afeaki after he allegedly drew a gun on the three officers.
2024-03-16	Anthony T. George (57)	Black	Macomb, Illinois	Police responded to reports of a domestic disturbance at an apartment complex and heard screaming from in the building, where they found a 36-year-old woman had been stabbed and injured. Officers encountered George, who was allegedly holding a knife. He disappeared around a corner and grabbed 4-year-old Miller, holding him at knifepoint. An officer fired one shot, killing both George and Miller.
2024-03-16	Terrell Miller (4)	Black	Macomb, Illinois	Police responded to reports of a domestic disturbance at an apartment complex and heard screaming from in the building, where they found a 36-year-old woman had been stabbed and injured. Officers encountered George, who was allegedly holding a knife. He disappeared around a corner and grabbed 4-year-old Miller, holding him at knifepoint. An officer fired one shot, killing both George and Miller.
2024-03-16	Ray Castro (19)	Hispanic	South Beloit, Illinois	
2024-03-16	Martin Sebastian (28)	Hispanic	Los Angeles, California	
2024-03-16	Donavan Ray Favors (42)	Black	Frisco, Texas	Police shot and killed Favors during a burglary call after he allegedly fired at them.
2024-03-16	Tyler Stansberry (24)	Latino	Fort Dodge, Iowa	Police responded to a distress call at Stansberry's home and shot him after he allegedly ran at offices holding two knives.
2024-03-16	Paul Smith (40)	White	Hudson, Florida	
2024-03-15	Steve Amann (39)	White	Davie, Florida	
2024-03-14	Matthew Blankman (39)	White	Eagle, Wisconsin	After receiving a 911 call about a man firing off a firearm out a residence, a Waukesha County Sheriff's deputy encountered Blankman and fatally shot him.
2024-03-14	Charles Neace (34)	White	Covington, Kentucky	Police received reports about Neace beating on a door while armed with a butcher knife. Two officers arrived at the scene and held Neace at gunpoint. According to police, the Neace "came at" the officers, who then fatally shot him.
2024-03-13	Clay Twyman (17)	White	Louisville, Kentucky	An off-duty Louisville Metro Police Department officer struck Twyman while driving an unmarked vehicle. Twyman died in hospital.
2024-03-13	Raul Portugal (47)	Latino	Jamestown, Tennessee	Officers were dispatched to a domestic dispute. Upon arrival, they encountered a man with a machete. A taser was deployed but it was ineffective. At some point, an officer discharged his weapon, fatally striking him.
2024-03-13	unidentified male	Hispanic	Irving, Texas	A man drove through the President George Bush Turnpike at high speed, which resulted in a police chase. The chase went on until the suspect was stopped by traffic. He then exited his car armed with a knife and ran into a grassy area. Police commanded him to drop the knife, but the suspect did not reply and eventually moved toward the officers, which caused them to retreat back to their vehicle. An officer then fired at the suspect several times, killing him.
2024-03-13	Ismael Castillo (29)	Latino	Las Vegas, Nevada	A man was shot and killed by Las Vegas Police outside of a Target store after robbing a person while armed with a knife. Police initially commanded the suspect to drop his weapon, but he refused and then charged at an officer, which was when he was shot.
2024-03-13	Dylan Austin (28)	White	Niangua, Missouri	
2024-03-12	Dimitri Calvert (30)	Black	Springdale, Arkansas	Police were called after reports Calvert was destroying property with a knife. A Springdale Police officer shot and killed Calvert after he allegedly held his knife to a bystander's throat.
2024-03-12	Edward Brooks (43)	Black	North Las Vegas, Nevada	Police responded to calls about shots being fired at an apartment complex. When they arrived outside the apartment, they were met with Brooks, armed with gun. The officers ordered Brooks to drop his weapon, but he did not comply and walked toward them. Two of the officers then fatally shot Brooks. Police found the bodies of three women and a dog in nearby apartments, all of which were shot to death.
2024-03-11	Cristhian Felipe Salinas Castillo (34)	Hispanic	Montgomery County, Texas	Police responded to a call at a home in the Chapel Run subdistrict. Upon arrival, officers heard screaming from inside the home and went inside. Inside the home, they encountered a man armed with a gun holding a woman in a headlock, whom they believed he was attempting to sexually assault. The woman escaped, and the officers commanded the man to drop his gun. After he refused to comply, he was fatally shot.
2024-03-11	Roosevelt Overton Jr. (44)	Black	Oak Ridge North, Texas	The suspect was wanted for multiple robberies across the Houston area. Officers spotted the man as he was robbing a liquor store at gunpoint. The officers attempted to stop him as he left the store and commanded him to drop his gun. He did not comply with their commands, and was eventually shot and killed by the officers.
2024-03-11	Jody Lyn Lewis (45)	White	Hot Springs, Arkansas	
2024-03-10	Justin Wade Hancock (28)	White	Pecos County, Texas	
2024-03-10	Cole Jackson Hughes (53)	White	Bakersfield, California	
2024-03-10	Trinidad Ledesma (44)	Latino	Surprise, Arizona	
2024-03-10	Rick Robert Chavez (35)	Latino	Santa Fe, New Mexico	
2024-03-09	Zacariah Devore (47)	White	Lakewood, Colorado	
2024-03-09	Justin Strawser (39)	White	Mooresville, North Carolina	
2024-03-09	Steven David Barlok (40)	White	Wilmington, North Carolina	
2024-03-09	Ryan Gainer (15)	Black	Apple Valley, California	Deputies responded to a call Gainer was assaulting a family member and broke a window. The deputy arrived at the front door of the home, where Gainer was standing inside holding a five-foot long garden tool with a bladed end. Gainer ran toward the deputy, who gave gainer a number of verbal warnings to stay back, and was shot dead when he failed to comply.
2024-03-08	Antonio Sessions (44)	Black	Paris, Texas	Police responded to an Atwoods store after a call that Sessions, of Greenville, Texas, had barricaded himself inside a dressing room. When police arrived, Sessions allegedly ran to the exit, then grabbed an officer's taser. The officer shot Sessions when he allegedly pointed the taser at him.
2024-03-08	Djamshed Nematov (46)	White	New York City, New York	Police were called to an apartment building in Rego Park, Queens after Nematov stabbed his wife during their grandchild's first birthday party. Several officers shot and killed Nematov after he allegedly charged at them holding the knives. A neighbor of Nematov said he may not have understood the officers' commands, as he was from Uzbekistan and did not speak English.
2024-03-08	Joseph Russell (36)	White	Rochester, New Hampshire	Russell was wanted for his involvement in several vehicle thefts. He was spotted by Rochester Police while driving in the city, who pursued him. He was intercepted at Route 16, before abandoning his vehicle armed with a firearm. Russell was spotted near a residential area, and was taken down by a police dog. Police then said they saw him discharge a weapon and then fatally shot him.
2024-03-08	Francisco Hernandez (36)	Hispanic	Albuquerque, New Mexico	
2024-03-08	Joshua Watson (40)	Unknown	Riverton, Utah	
2024-03-08	Vincent Correa (44)	Unknown	Hamilton Township, New Jersey	Police Officers responded to a 911 call concerning a domestic dispute. During the encounter, 44-year-old Vincent Correa exchanged gunfire with two officers. Correa was pronounced deceased at the scene. Officer Fiabane was transported to a hospital with non-fatal injuries and has since been released.
2024-03-08	Patrick Flores (47)	Unknown	Cheyenne, Wyoming	
2024-03-07	Gregor Fleming Jr. (44)	White	Mechanicsburg, Pennsylvania	
2024-03-07	Andre Lamar Lindsey Jr. (33)	Black	Phoenix, Arizona	
2024-03-07	Quinton Baker (37)	Black	Lake Charles, Louisiana	
2024-03-07	Daizia Williams (27)	Black	Columbus, Georgia	
2024-03-06	Rafael Molina (59)	Hispanic	Pompano Beach, Florida	
2024-03-06	Alejandro Campos Rios (50)	Hispanic	Fullerton, California	Police responded to a McDonald's restaurant for a call of a man acting erratically, where they found him holding a belt. After a taser failed to work, police shot the man with a beanbag shotgun, resulting in his death.
2024-03-06	Luis Alfonso Rivera (35)	Hispanic	Wichita, Kansas	
2024-03-05	Michael Estrada (30)	Latino	El Paso, Texas	
2024-03-04	Raymond Mireles (35)	Latino	San Antonio, Texas	A man wanted on aggravated robbery charges was shot and killed by two police officers when he allegedly brandished a firearm at them.
2024-03-03	Abdul Kamara (29)	Unknown	San Diego, California	
2024-03-03	unidentified male (32)	Latino	Dulzura, California	A BORTAC sniper shot and killed a Mexican citizen in the Otay Mountain Wilderness. The Border Patrol stated the man was part of a group of Mexican bandits who were robbing migrants in the area, and that the man had pointed a gun at one victim before the sniper shot him.
2024-03-03	unidentified male (45)	Unknown	Houston, Texas	A 45-year-old man died after he was fatally shot by a Houston Police officer near Petersen Elementary School.
2024-03-03	unidentified male	Unknown	Tishomingo, Oklahoma	Johnston County Sheriff deputy fatally the man who reported pulled put out a firearm during a traffic stop. The man was wanted for violating a Protective Order.
2024-03-03	Isaiah Gregory Hill (25)	White	Clinton, Tennessee	
2024-03-03	Antwon Booker (30)	Black	Collierville, Tennessee	
2024-03-03	Charlie Baker (62)	White	York, South Carolina	
2024-03-02	Ezekiel Savell (31)	Hispanic	Galveston, Texas	
2024-03-02	Jeffrey Lynn Chapman (67)	White	Saint Michael, Minnesota	A sheriff's deputy pulled Chapman over. The reason for the stop was not released, though an affidavit noted Chapman appeared to have altered his license plate to make a "C" look like an "O". During the stop, the deputy shot and killed Chapman after he allegedly refused to comply with commands. The initial report stated Chapman had a knife, but later reports stated he was holding a pipe.
2024-03-02	Lance Wayne Bryson (42)	White	Harlan, Kentucky	
2024-03-02	Cody Whiterock (39)	Native American	Riddle, Idaho	Agents from the Bureau of Indian Affairs (BIA) pursued Whiterock from the Duck Valley Indian Reservation across state lines from Nevada to Idaho. Few details were immediately released, other than that Whiterock exited his vehicle and ran, and BIA agents shot him.
2024-03-02	unidentified teenager	Unknown	Humble, Texas	A teenager who was suspected of vehicle theft was fatally shot after he allegedly pulled out a gun on Harris County deputies pursuing the teen on foot.
2024-03-01	Christopher Dahl (19)	Unknown	San Antonio, Texas	
2024-03-01	Christopher Vanschoick (36)	White	Eureka Springs, Arkansas	
2024-03-01	Andrew Zigler (52)	White	Janesville, Wisconsin	
2024-03-01	unidentified male	Unknown	Meridian, Mississippi	A Lauderdale county sheriff initiated a traffic stop. During this, the passenger in the vehicle allegedly exited car and fired a shot at the deputy, who shot the man in return.
2024-03-01	unidentified male	Black	Houston, Texas	A police officer shot and killed a gunman who allegedly fired at him during an assault investigation.
2024-03-01	Christopher Cauch (43)	Unknown	Denver, Colorado	A Denver Police officer fatally shot a man who was holding hostages at a 7-Eleven. The man was allegedly armed with a sharp object.

== See also ==
- Death in custody § United States
- Henry A. Wallace Police Crime Public Database
- List of cases of police brutality
- List of countries with annual rates and counts for killings by law enforcement officers
- List of law enforcement officers killed in the line of duty in the United States
- List of law enforcement officers convicted for an on-duty killing in the United States
- List of shootings by US immigration agents
- List of police reforms related to the George Floyd protests
- List of unarmed African Americans killed by law enforcement officers in the United States
- Lists of killings by law enforcement officers
- Police brutality in the United States
- Police misconduct § United States
- Police riot § United States
- Police use of deadly force in the United States
