= Gate Fire =

2017 wildfire in Southern California

- Part of the 2017 California wildfires
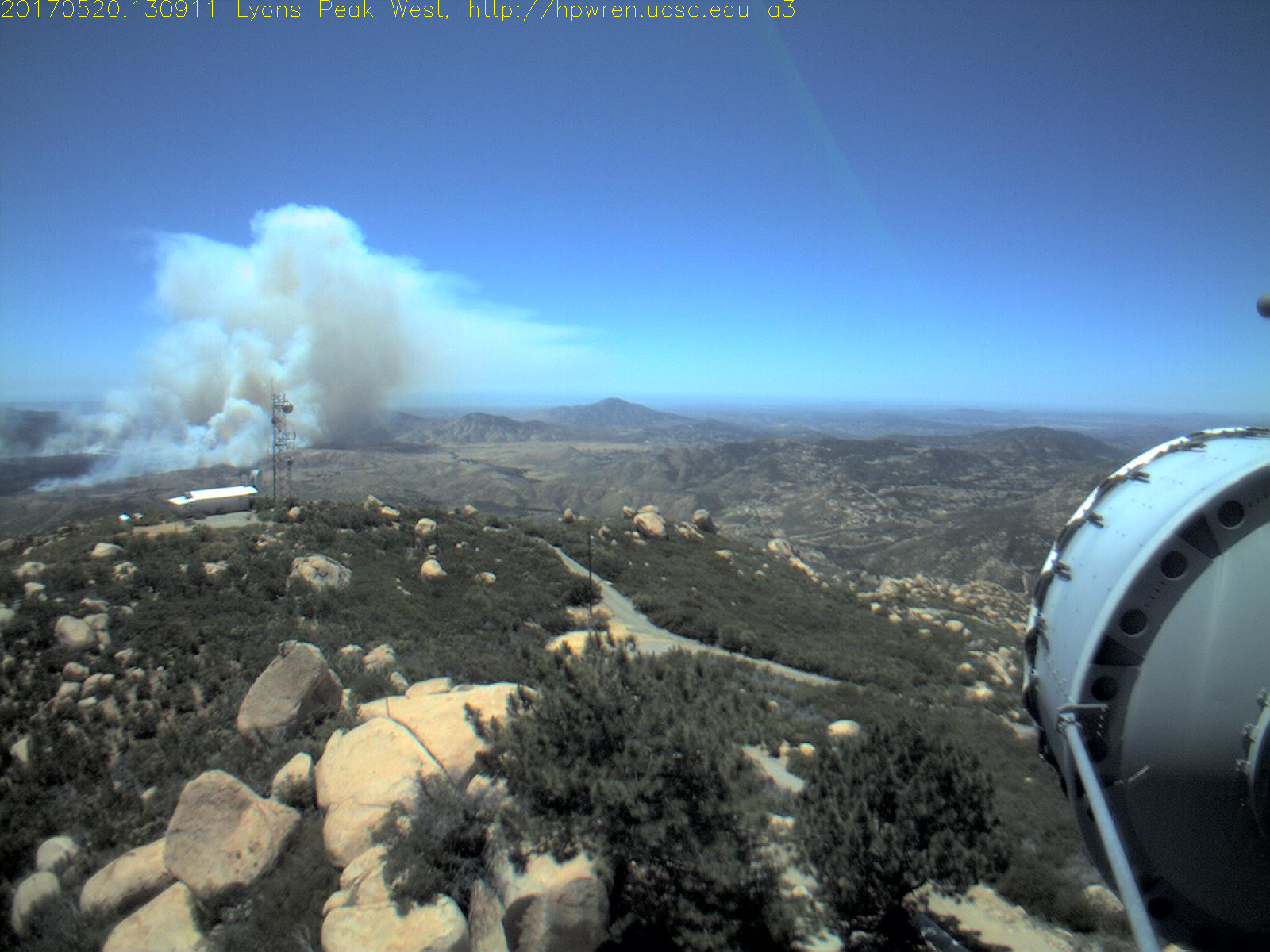
- The Gate Fire burning as seen from the Lyons Peak West cam.
- Date: May 20, 2017 –; May 23, 2017
- Location: San Diego County, California
- Coordinates: 32.65°N 116.80527°W

Statistics
- Burned area: 2,056 acres (8 km^{2})

Impacts
- Deaths: None reported
- Injuries: 1

Ignition
- Cause: Under investigation

Map
- Location in Southern California

The Gate Fire was a wildfire that burned in the Dulzura area southeast of Jamul along Highway 94 in the southern part of San Diego County, California in May 2017. Within the day, the fire spread from an initially reported 10 acres (4.0 ha) to then 1,500 acres (610 ha) in a matter of a few hours, as the fire was pushed by strong winds and dry grasslands mixed with chaparral. The wildfire resulted in evacuation of 500 campers from the Pio Pico RV Resort and Campground. Highway 94 was also closed to the public due to the fire. The fire was named the Gate incident due to its proximity to a landmark pink gate in the Dulzura area.

== Events ==
Around 11:20 am on May 20, the fire was first reported burning with a moderate-to-rapid rate of spread near Highway 94 and Otay Lakes Road. Initially reported at 10 acres, the fire soon ballooned from 500 to then 800 acres by 5:55 pm that day. Road closures were put into effect on Highway 94 from Honey Springs Road to Highway 188, and on Otay Lakes Road. A Red Cross shelter was set up at Otay Ranch High School for evacuated residents and campers from the Dulzura and Thousand Trails campground area. A Chula Vista police officer who was directing traffic near the Gate Fire was struck by a vehicle and seriously injured as a result.

The Gate fire was declared 100% contained on May 23, after consuming a total 2,056 acres.

== Cause ==
On May 20, California officials launched a criminal investigation into the cause of the Gate fire, citing a video posted on Instagram showing the fire igniting with a group of people running away from the scene. The investigation into the exact cause of the fire remains undetermined.
