= Forbestown =

Forbestown may refer to:

- Forbestown, California, in Butte County
- Forbestown, California, former name of Lakeport, California
