= Hill Fire =

Hill Fire may refer to:

- Hill Fire (2017), a wildfire in San Luis Obispo County, California
- Hill Fire (2018), a wildfire in Ventura County, California
