= Ponderosa Fire (2017) =

2017 wildfire in Northern California

- Part of the 2017 California wildfires
- Date: August 29, 2017 –; September 23, 2017
- Location: Forbestown, California, United States
- Coordinates: 39.57701°N 121.30209°W

Statistics
- Burned area: 4,016 acres (16 km^{2})

Impacts
- Injuries: 2
- Structures lost: 32 single residences; 22 outbuildings

Ignition
- Cause: Human caused

Map
- Location of fire in California.

The Ponderosa Fire was a wildland fire near Forbestown in Butte County, California in the United States. The fire started on August 29, 2017. The cause is still under investigation. The fire was 100% contained on September 23, after it had burned 4,016 acres (16 km^{2}).

== Progression ==
The fire began at Ponderosa Way and Lumpkin Road, two miles northwest of Forbestown in Butte County, California. It was first reported on August 29 at 1:16 pm.

On August 29, California Department of Forestry and Fire Protection law enforcement arrested a 29-year-old man, John Ballenger, from Oroville, California, on suspicion of starting the fire. However, California Department of Forestry and Fire Protection reports the cause of the fire is still under investigation.

The Evergreen 747 Supertanker began assisting in fighting the fire on August 30, dropping 8,500 gallons of fire retardant.

On September 4, 2017, the fire was at 4,016 acres (16 km^{2}), with 68% contained. There were two injuries and 54 buildings destroyed, including 32 homes. Parts of Lumpkin Road were closed between Forbestown Road and Mill Road. Evaluation orders were in place for all areas and residences on Lumpkin Road and the community of Forbestown, but those were canceled by September 4. The Ponderosa Fire is located in an inaccessible, steep area that is experiencing 100 degree and higher temperatures. It comprises a mix of grass, brush, and timber litter in a very dry area. Winds made it challenging for firefighters to battle the fire but conditions are improving. As of September 4, 1,685 firefighters, 128 fire engines, 43 fire crews, 12 helicopters, 22 bulldozers, and 26 Water Tenders were fighting the fire.

By the morning of September 6, the number of firefighters battling the Ponderosa Fire had increased to 1,775, with support from 5 Aerial firefighting helicopters. The next day, the number of personnel had declined dramatically to 234. On September 23, the fire was 100% contained, at 4,016 acres (16 km^{2}). A total of 32 homes were destroyed and 22 outbuildings. The cause had been declared as human caused.

== Effects ==
A total of 32 homes had been destroyed, along with 22 outbuildings, with two people injured.

== See also ==
- 2017 California wildfires
