= Winters Fire =

2017 wildfire in Northern California

- Part of the 2017 California wildfires
- Date: July 6, 2017 –; July 12, 2017
- Location: Vaca Mountains, Yolo County, California
- Coordinates: 38.49521°N 122.0251°W

Statistics
- Burned area: 2,269 acres (918 ha)

Ignition
- Cause: Under investigation

Map
- Location in California

The Winters Fire was a wildfire that started on Thursday, July 6, 2017 in the Vaca Mountains, near Lake Berryessa west of the city of Winters, in Yolo County, northern California. The fire was named the Winters incident due to its proximity to the city.

== Progression ==
On Thursday, July 7, at around 12:45 p.m. a fire was reported burning in the area of Pleasant View Road, three miles southwest of the town of Winters. Soon dubbed the Winters Fire, the blaze was initially reported 30 acres in size with a moderate rate of spread. Highway 128 was soon shut down as the fire burned north, away from the highway. By that afternoon, mandatory evacuations were ordered for Pleasant View Road and Positas Rd near Highway 128 and Golden Bear Estates as the fire ballooned to 500 acres. As of 6 p.m., that evening, the fire had burned upwards of 1,000 acres as more than 500 fire personnel were on scene fighting the incident, putting containment at 15 percent.

The Winters Fire burned within the same perimeter of the Cold Fire of August 2016, as well as other previous brushfires such as the 2015 Wragg Fire and 2014 Monticello Fire. Winters City Manager John Donlevy stated that this was now the fourth year in row where a major wildfire had burned in virtually exactly the same area.

By Friday morning, July 7, the fire had consumed 1,800 acres however by 2 p.m. the mandatory evacuations for Positas Road and Golden Bear Estates had been lifted. The fire's acreage was reported at 1,931 acres (781 ha) due to better mapping of the fire area. The fire was fully contained on July 12 after consuming 2,269 acres.
