= Palmer Fire =

2017 wildfire in Southern California

- Part of the 2017 California wildfires
- Date: September 2, 2017 –; September 6, 2017
- Location: Beaumont, California, United States

Statistics
- Burned area: 3,874 acres (16 km^{2})

Ignition
- Cause: Fireworks

The Palmer Fire was a wildfire in Beaumont, California in the United States. The fire was reported on September 2, 2017, and was 100% contained by September 6 at 11:53 AM. The cause of the fire was fireworks. The Palmer Fire burned a total of 3,874 acres (16 km^{2}).

== Progression ==
The Palmer Fire was reported on September 2, 2017, at 1:33 PM, in Beaumont, California near San Timoteo Canyon Road and Fisherman's Retreat. Upon arrival, the fire was burning 50 acres (0 km^{2}). Approximately one hour later, the fire was burning 500 acres (2 km^{2}) and at 3:30 pm evacuation orders were in place for Oak Canyon Road between San Timoteo Canyon Road and Interstate 10. By the end of the day, the fire had 3,200 acres (13 km^{2}) and was 10% contained. Redlands Boulevard, south of San Timoteo Canyon Road, was closed and evacuation centers were opened in Redlands and Yucaipa. Approximately 450 people were evacuated from their homes.

By morning on September 3, the fire had spread 3,300 acres (13 km^{2}) and was 15% contained and evacuations were removed. By the end of the day, 3,800 acres (15 km^{2}) were burning and 35% was contained. On September 6, the fire was 100% contained, after burning 3,874 acres (16 km^{2}). The cause of the fire was fireworks. 300 fire personnel fought the fire.

== See also ==
- 2017 California wildfires
