= Parker 2 Fire =

2017 wildfire in Northern California

- Part of the 2017 California wildfires
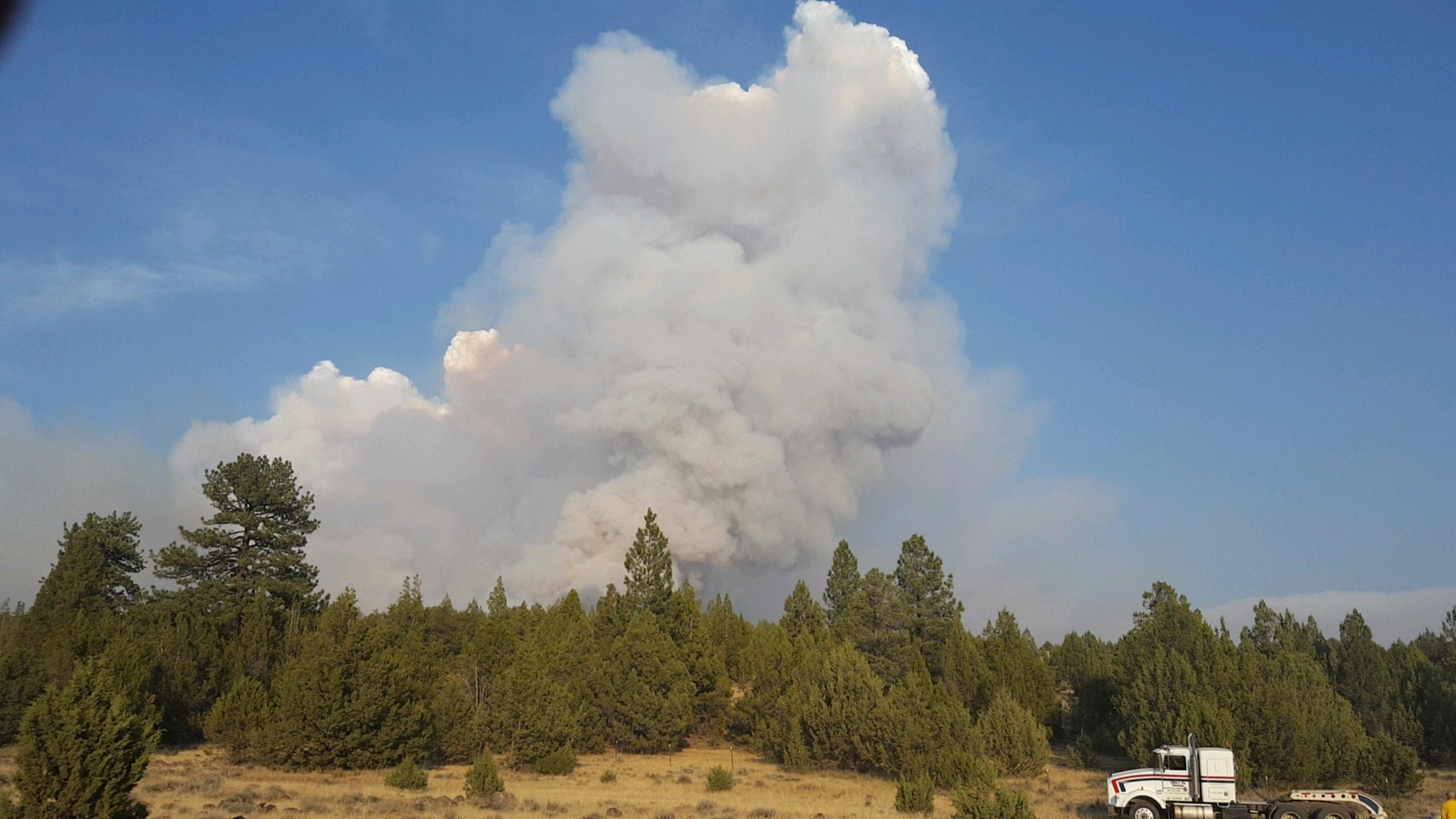
- Parker 2 Fire on August 3, 2017
- Date: August 3, 2017 –; August 28, 2017
- Location: Modoc National Forest, California, United States
- Coordinates: 41.466°N 120.321°W

Statistics
- Burned area: 7,697 acres (31 km^{2})

Map
- Location of fire in California.

The Parker 2 Fire was a wildfire in the Modoc National Forest in Modoc County, California in the United States. The fire, which was reported on August 3, 2017, burned a total of 7,697 acres (31 km^{2}). It was fully contained by August 28. The cause for the fire was lightning.

== Progression ==
The Parker 2 Fire was first reported on August 3 at 2:00 pm. The fire was started by lightning and was fueled by grass, brush and timber. As of August 4, the fire grew to 1,500 acres (6 km^{2}). As a result, the Parker Creek area of the Warner Mountains was closed.

The fire was contained, as of August 28, burning a total of 7,697 acres (31 km^{2}).

== Effects ==
The Middle Fork Parker Creek Bridge was damaged by the fire. A temporary, portable bridge was provided by the Shasta-Trinity National Forest until a permanent solution is finalized.
