= Schaeffer Fire =

2017 wildfire in Central California

- Part of the 2017 California wildfires
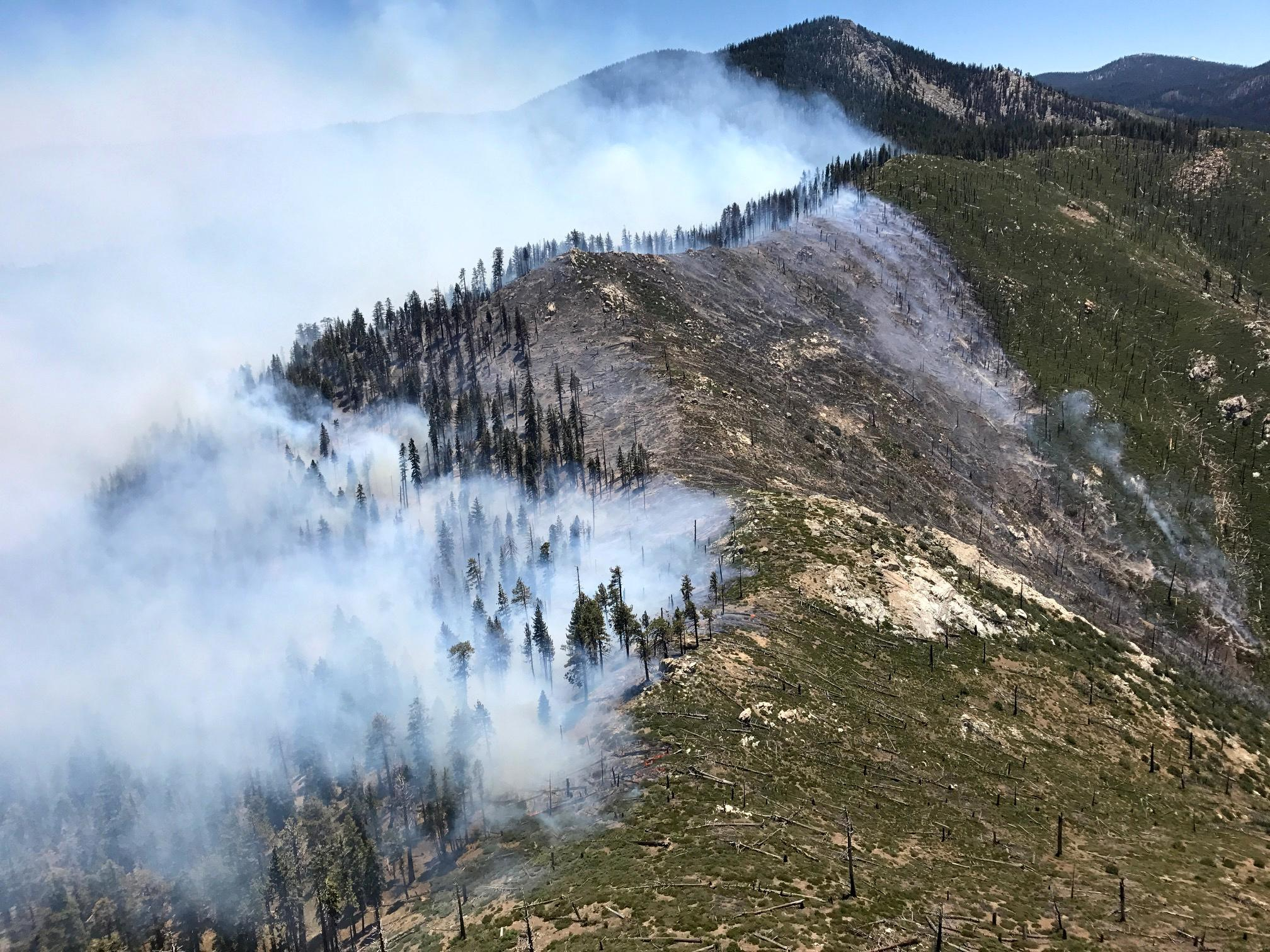
- Schaeffer Fire, June 27
- Date: June 24, 2017 –; July 31, 2017
- Location: Kernville, Tulare County, California
- Coordinates: 36.099°N 118.412°W

Statistics
- Burned area: 16,031 acres (65 km^{2})

Ignition
- Cause: Lightning

Map
- Location in California

The Schaeffer Fire was a wildfire in the Kern River Ranger District of the Sequoia National Forest in Tulare County, California in the United States. It was caused by a lightning strike on June 24, 2017. The fire crept through the old burn area of the 2002 McNally Fire for several days before growing to over 580 acres on June 28. The fire was contained by August 10 and destroyed a total of 16,031 acres (65 km^{2}).

== Events ==
Reported, Saturday, June 24, at approximately 4:16 p.m., the Sacheffer Fire was created by lightning. Burning in the McNally Fire wildfire burn area, it was fueled by brush, timber and tall grass. Two fire personnel worked to put out the fire, which in total burned 16,031 acres (65 km^{2}).

Smoke from the fire was seen throughout the Lake Isabella area. The fire caused the San Joaquin Valley Air Pollution Control District to alert a smoke advisory in the area.

The fire was contained at midnight on July 31, 2017. As of August 10, the repair work had begun.

== See also ==
- 2017 California wildfires
