= Mud Fire =

2017 wildfire in Northern California

- Part of the 2017 California wildfires
- Date: August 29, 2017 –; September 1, 2017
- Location: Litchfield, California, United States
- Coordinates: 40.395°N 120.243°W

Statistics
- Burned area: 6,042 acres (24 km^{2})

Map
- Location of fire in California.

The Mud Fire was a wildfire north of Litchfield, Lassen County, California in the United States. The fire, which was reported on August 29, 2017, burned a total of 6,042 acres (24 km^{2}). It was fully contained on September 1. The fire was caused by lightning.

== Progression ==
The Mud Fire was first reported on August 29 at 2:30 pm. The fire, located east of US Route 395 and north of Litchfield, was started by lightning and was fueled by rangeland grass, sagebrush and juniper. The fire was contained on September 1 and burned a total of 6,042 acres (24 km^{2}). A total of 13 fire personnel fought the fire.

== Effects ==
No structures of infrastructure were damaged by the Mud Fire, however, significant habitat for the greater sage-grouse was destroyed.
