= Wall Fire =

2017 wildfire in Northern California

- Part of the 2017 California wildfires
- Date: July 7, 2017 –; July 17, 2017
- Location: Bangor, Butte County, California
- Coordinates: 39.45352°N 121.41222°W

Statistics
- Burned area: 6,033 acres (2,441 ha)

Impacts
- Injuries: 0
- Structures lost: 101 (41 homes, 60 other)

Ignition
- Cause: Under investigation

Map
- Location in California

The Wall Fire was a wildfire in 2017 near Bangor in Eastern Butte County, in California, in the United States. Named for its ignition point near Chinese Wall Road, it was reported at 2:52 PM PDT on July 7, 2017. The fire was contained on July 17, 2017, and burned a total of 6,033 acres (2,441 ha).

== Progression ==
The fire broke out near Chinese Wall Road, five miles north of Bangor at 2:50 p.m. on Friday, July 7, and immediately became a threat to surrounding structures in the valley. Within a half hour of burning, the fire was a reported 50 acres in size but within three hours had ballooned to 500 acres (200 ha). An immediate evacuation order was put into effect for Hurleton Swedes Flat Road from Grand Oak to Swedes Flat as well as all connecting roads. An evacuation center was set up at the Church of the Nazarene in South Oroville.

By Saturday, July 8, the fire was a reported 2,000 acres in size with an estimated 10 homes destroyed and a mere 2% containment. A reported five people had already been injured as a result of the fire, four of which were civilians. Over the course of the day, the fire reportedly doubled in size to over 4,400 acres as nearly 1,000 fire personnel were on scene fighting the fire. More structures were seen burning in the area although there were unknown estimate as to how many were homes.

On Sunday morning, July 9, evacuation orders were extended to include Oro Bangor Highway from Swedes Flat Road to Avocado Road, including all connection roads and areas, leaving 750 structures threatened by the fire. However, containment was up by 17 percent. By mid afternoon, that day, the fire was 5,000 acres in size with 17 percent of the fire contained.

The fire had grown to 5,800 acres on the evening of July 10 as over 5,400 structures were still threatened, however over 1,700 firecrews had contained 40 percent of the incident.

At the height of the fire, evacuation orders were put into effect for more than 4,000 residents and an additional 7,400 people were put under an evacuation advisory, according to officials. Gov. Jerry Brown issued a state of emergency for the Butte County area on Sunday, July 9.

The Wall Fire was 100% contained by 9:45 am, July 17. In total, it burned 6,033 acres (2,441 ha). In total, 147 fire personnel fought the fire, supported by 10 fire engines, 4 dozers, and 2 water tenders. The cause of the fire is still under investigation.

== Effects ==
The Wall Fire destroyed 41 homes. Three additional homes were damaged and 57 other structures were either damaged or destroyed.

The Department of Toxic Substances Control began removing toxic waste from 32 residential properties after screening burned homes for any hazardous waste left after the fire.

== See also ==
- 2017 California wildfires
