= Holcomb Fire =

2017 wildfire in Southern California

- Part of the 2017 California wildfires
- Date: June 26, 2017 –; June 29, 2017
- Location: San Bernardino County, California
- Coordinates: 34.30°N 116.836081°W

Statistics
- Burned area: 1,503 acres (6 km^{2})

Impacts
- Injuries: 2

Ignition
- Cause: Under investigation

Map
- Location in Southern California

The Holcomb Fire was a wildfire that burned due north of Big Bear Lake near Highway 18 in the San Bernardino National Forest in San Bernardino County, California. Within several days, the fire would consume some 1,500 plus acres as it threatened the areas of Baldwin Lake (San Bernardino County, California) and Highway 18. However, while the fire rapidly grew in size, the head of the fire was seen to be moving away from structures, thus leaving evacuated areas under voluntary evacuation.

== Progression ==
Reported just after 3 p.m. off Holcomb Valley Road north of Highway 18, the Holcomb fire was initially reported burning in heavy timber, tall grass and chaparral with a rapid rate of spread. Voluntary evacuations for homes in the Baldwin Lake, Holcomb Valley and Big Bear dump areas were put into effect. Highway 18 from Baldwin Lake Road north to the Mitsubishi Cement Plant was also closed. The fire caused rolling power outages throughout the Big Bear area as temperatures in the mountains reached into the upper 80s, straining power conditions. On Tuesday, a major flare up on the eastern flank of the wildfire ran through an area close to homes thus prompting local law enforcement to issue a door-to-door mandatory evacuation of the Baldwin Lake area, however within a few hours that evacuation was downgraded to an evacuation advisory. At the Holcomb fire's peak, more than 1,000 firefighters were assigned to battled the incident. By breaking the 1985 temperature on Monday, Big Bear reach a high of 89 degrees. With winds anywhere from 5–23 mph, the firefighters struggled in the hot and dry climate. The firefighter prioritized the order of protection from fire personnel, then other people there, then property and structure if they could but was the last priority. David Kelly and his Southern California Incident Management Team along with the other 1,200 firefighters struggled to control the fire. The high temperatures are expected to last late into the week, then lower slightly before rising again over the weekend.

== Cause ==
Three days after the fires ignition, authorities asked for the public's help in establishing the cause of the Holcomb Fire. Anyone who may have been in the area of the Pacific Crest Trail, near Holcomb Valley Road, or the Doble Trail Camp between 6 p.m. Saturday and 3:05 p.m. Monday just before the fire occurred were urged to call the U.S. Forest Service fire investigators. The cause of the fire remains under investigation.

== Effects ==
The smoke from the fire traveled as far east as Los Angeles, up to 80 miles away. The firefighters used flash lights to see and bulldozers to plow away the burning grasses as the worked late into the evening Monday night. The exact number of homes affected by the fire is unknown, but fire officials believe there is only one. Although when they sought the owner of the small ranch just outside the San Bernardino county line, he was no to be found so they claimed no one was in immediate danger. Several roads including Highway 18 were closed due to the Holcomb Fire and its dangers.
