= Alamo Fire (2017) =

2017 wildfire in Southern California

- Part of the 2017 California wildfires
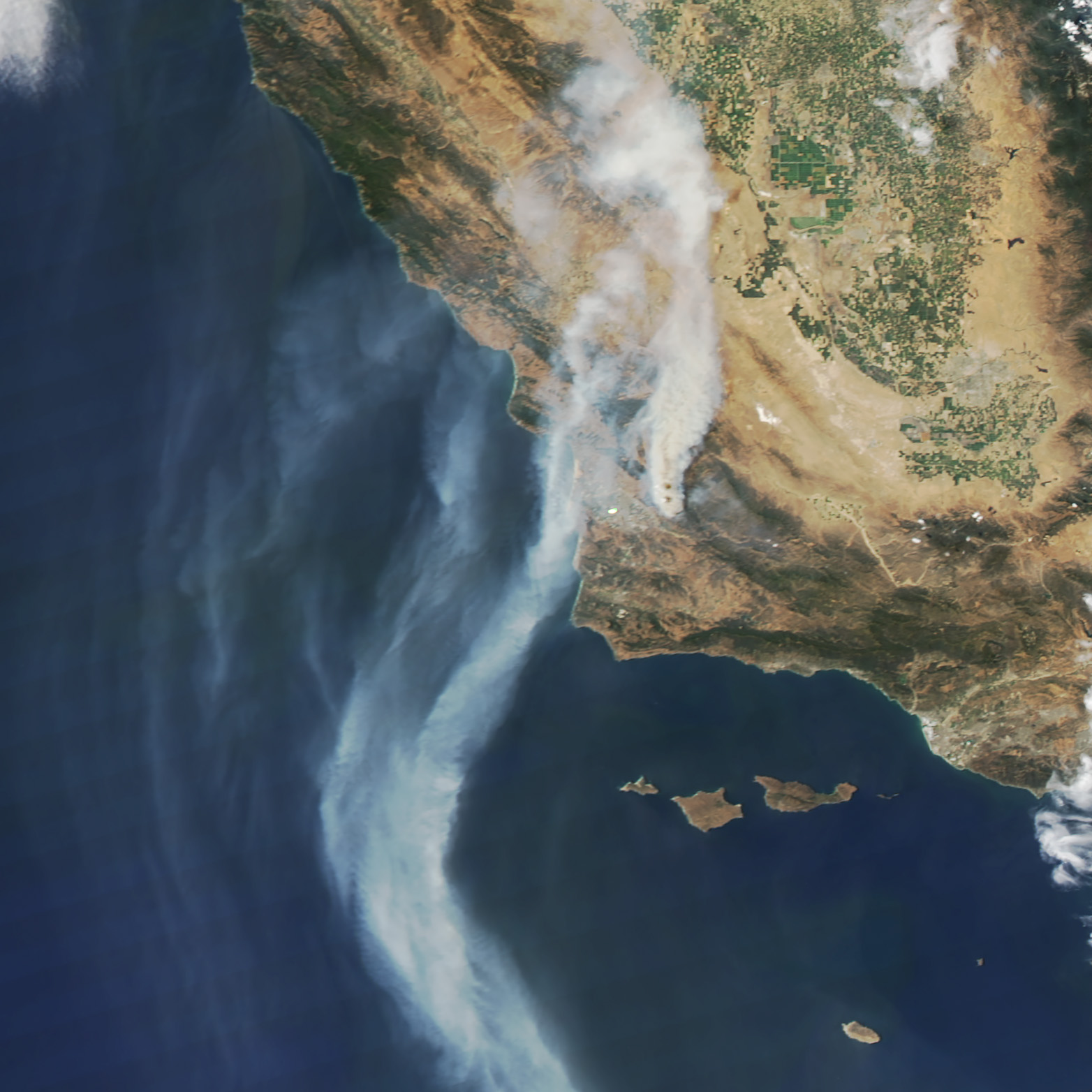
- Aerial image of smoke from Alamo Fire
- Date: July 6, 2017 –; July 19, 2017
- Location: Twitchell Reservoir, San Luis Obispo County, California
- Coordinates: 35.0179°N 120.3223°W

Statistics
- Burned area: 28,687 acres (11,609 ha)

Impacts
- Injuries: 3
- Structures lost: 2

Ignition
- Cause: Under investigation

Map
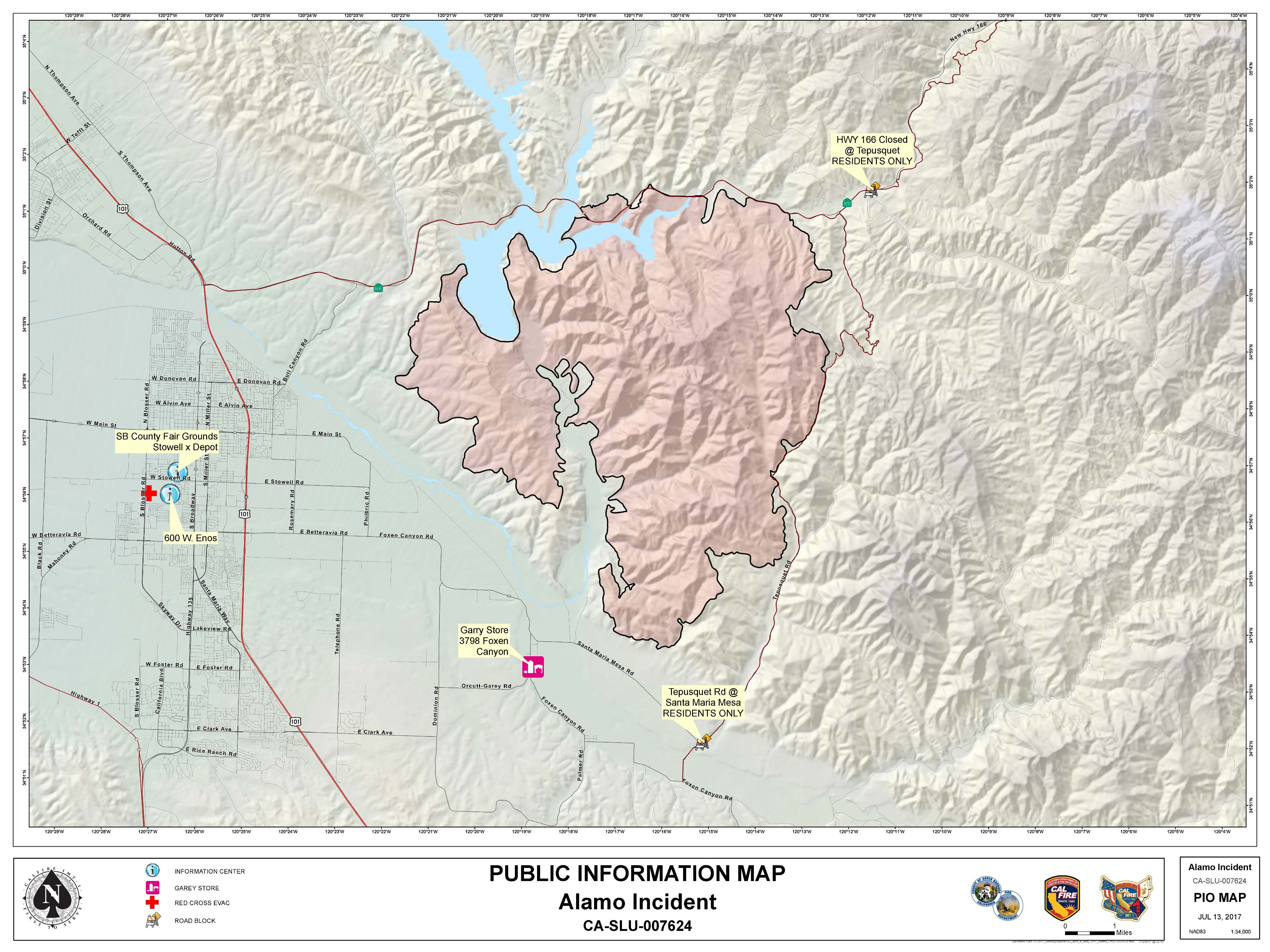
- Incident map near 100% containment

- Location in California

The Alamo Fire was a wildfire in San Luis Obispo County, in California in the United States. The fire started on July 6, 2017 and destroyed 28,687 acres (11,609 ha), including one home. It was fully contained on July 19, 2017. The cause of the fire remains under investigation.

== Progression ==
The fire was located off California State Route 166 near Twitchell Reservoir in San Luis Obispo County in California. The fire started on July 6, 2017. It quickly grew in size thanks to favorable weather conditions, with record-breaking temperatures, very low humidity, and high winds driving the fire's expansion. By July 9, 2017, it had become the largest active fire in California. It burned a total of 28,687 acres (11,609 ha). The fire was finally contained on July 19, 2017.

== Effects ==
It caused the evacuation of approximately 200 homes. 1664 firefighters fought the fire. One home was destroyed and one additional building was damaged.

== See also ==
- 2017 California wildfires
