= Whittier Fire =

2017 wildfire in Southern California

- Part of the 2017 California wildfires
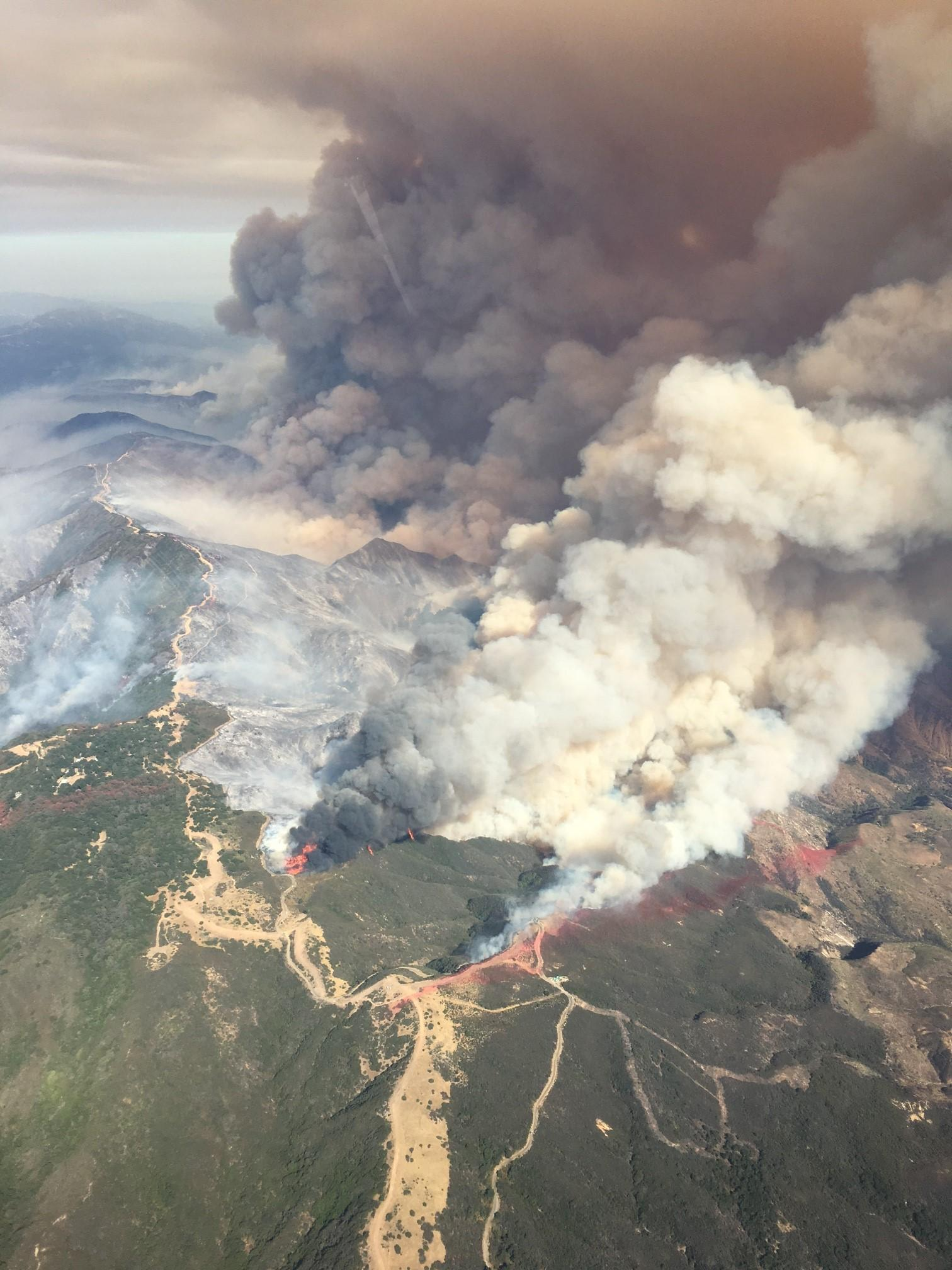
- Whittier Fire on July 16, 2017
- Date: July 8, 2017 –; October 5, 2017
- Location: Los Padres National Forest, Santa Barbara County, California
- Coordinates: 34.567°N 119.953°W

Statistics
- Burned area: 18,430 acres (75 km^{2})

Impacts
- Injuries: 9

Ignition
- Cause: Under investigation

Map
- Location in Southern California

The Whittier Fire was a wildfire in the Santa Ynez Mountains, south of Lake Cachuma, along Highway 154 in Santa Barbara County, California in the United States. The fire was reported on July 8, 2017, at 1:43 pm. Upon containment on July 28, the fire had burned a total of 18,430 acres (75 km^{2}) and destroyed 16 homes.

== Events ==
A view of the flames from Goleta on July 14, 2017.

The fire, which was first reported at 1:45 p.m. on Saturday, July 7, began burning in the Los Padres National Forest in chaparral that hadn't burned in approximately 70 years, according to officials. Reportedly ignited by a vehicle fire, flames jumped Highway 154 and proceed in a southeast direction towards the Santa Ynez Mountains. Eighty people, including mostly children, at Circle V Ranch Camp near Lake Cachuma were forced to shelter in place as when it became too late to evacuate. No campers or staff were injured. Throughout the course of the day, the fire had expanded from 330 to over 5,400 acres (22 km^{2}) as containment sat at zero-percent. Firefighters set up a command center at Dos Pueblos High School.

On the morning of July 9, the fire had burned 7,800 acres and was at 5% containment. Residents along Farren Road inside and west of Goleta were evacuated. 20 structures were destroyed, and a lot of evacuation was done along Highway 154.

In the afternoon on July 9, the fire burned down the Rancho Alegre Outdoor School. The fire remained "completely out of control", and sections of Highway 101 received evacuation warnings. Later that day, it was reported that over 3,600 people had evacuated as a result of the Whittier Fire.

On the morning of July 10, the fire had burned 10,823 acres and was still at 5% containment.

On the morning of July 12, the fire had burned 11,920 acres and was at 48% containment.

As of the evening of July 14, the fire was at 52% containment and had burned 13,199 acres. Due to changing weather conditions, the fire spread westward.

On July 15, containment had dropped to 35% as the fire was pushed down the mountainside toward Goleta due to sundowner winds. It had burned 17,364 acres.

On July 17, containment was at 49% and the fire had burned 18,311 acres.

As of September 12, the fire is still not fully contained. It is stuck at 87% containment due to possible hot spots and reports of smoke.

The fire was finally contained on October 5. Infrared survey 3 days prior to containment revealed some lingering heat sources, but they are located inside the containment line so the risk of further spread is minimal.

In total, 16 homes and 30 outbuildings were destroyed. One home and six outbuildings were damaged.

== Gallery ==
Smoke from the fire covers the sky over Goleta on July 8, 2017.

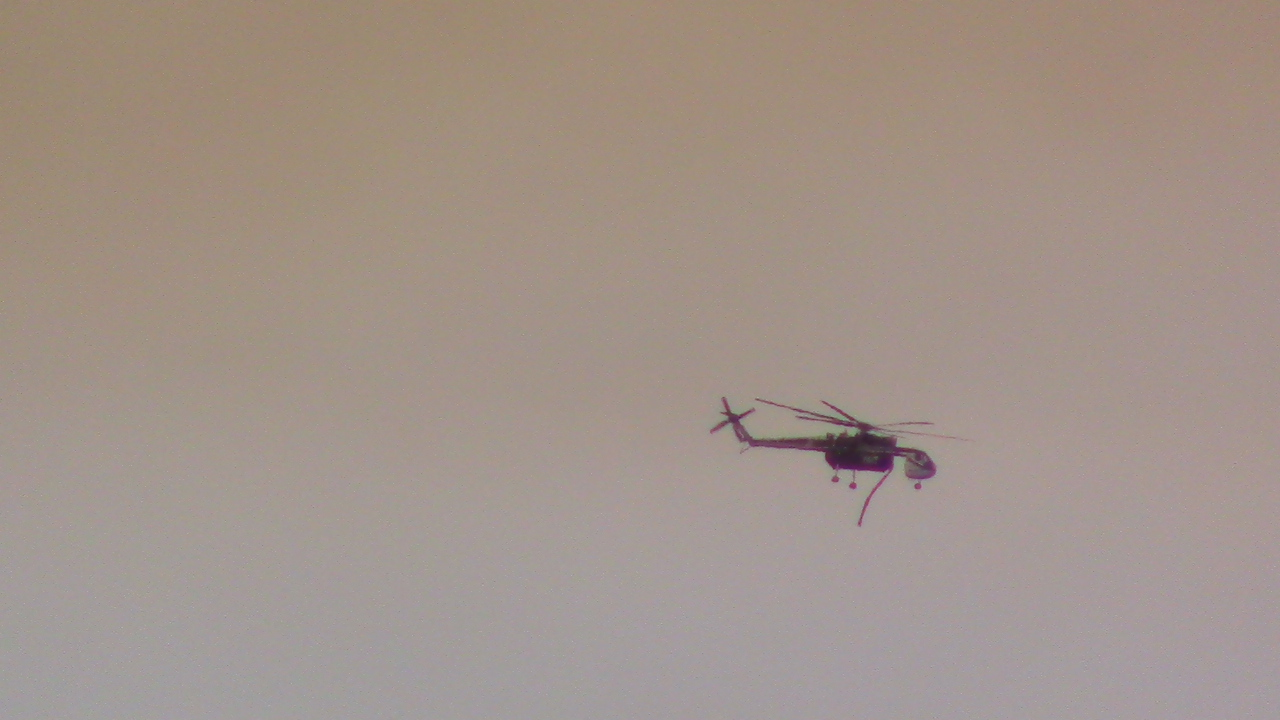
A helicopter leaving the Whittier Fire, July 11, 2017.

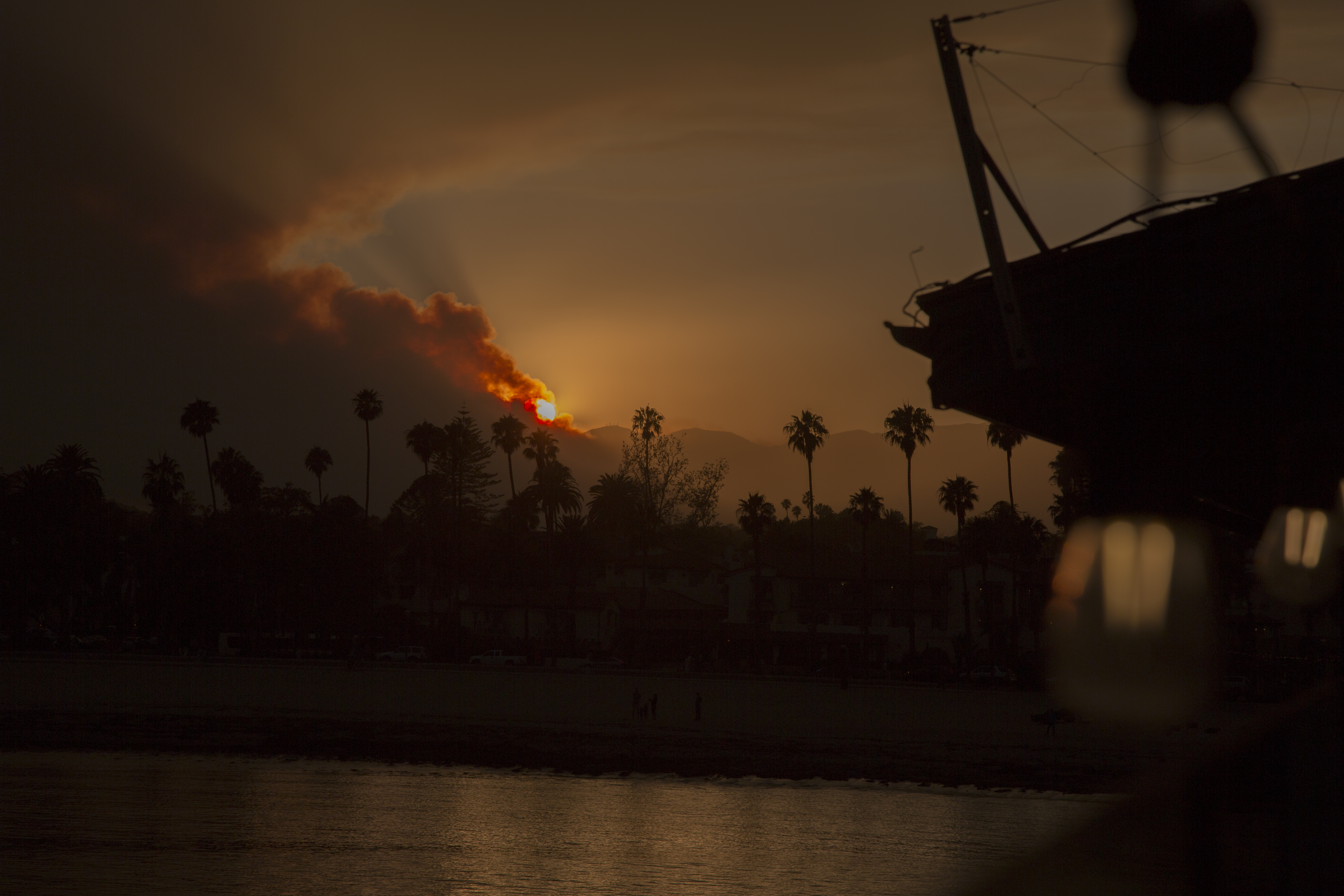
Smoke cloud seen from Stearns Wharf in Santa Barbara, July 14, 2017.

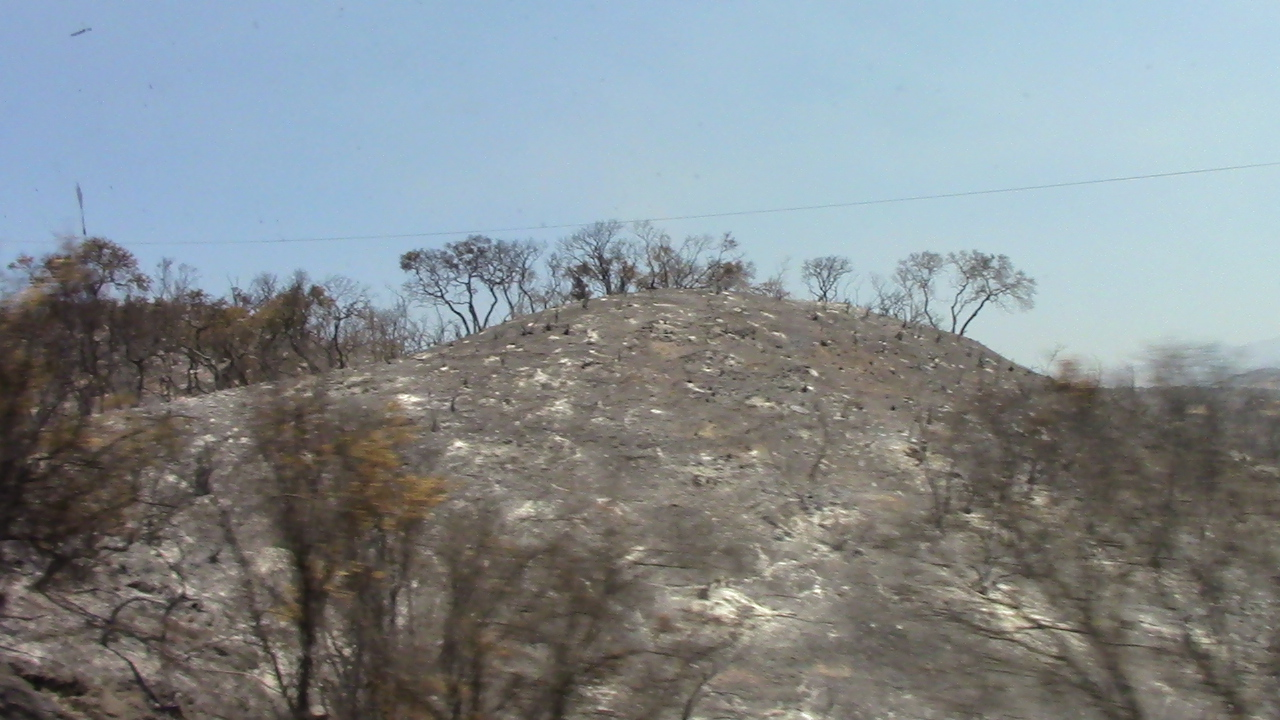
An area the Whittier Fire had burned, July 17, 2017.
