= Garza Fire =

2017 wildfire in California

- Part of the 2017 California wildfires
- Date: July 9, 2017 –; January 9, 2018
- Location: Kings County, California

Statistics
- Burned area: 48,889 acres (198 km^{2})

Impacts
- Structures lost: 1

Ignition
- Cause: Under Investigation

The Garza Fire was a fire during the 2017 California wildfire season. The fire started on July 9, 2017 by an unknown cause, and is under investigation. The fire burned 48,889 acres and destroyed 1 structure. There were 9 agencies involved during the fire, including Cal Fire. The fire was contained on January 9, 2018. The fire was active for 183 days total.
