= Salmon August Complex Fire =

2017 wildfire in Northern California

- Part of the 2017 California wildfires
- Date: June 25, 2017 –; December 8, 2017
- Location: Salmon Mountains, Siskiyou County, California, United States

Statistics
- Burned area: 65,888 acres (267 km^{2})

Impacts
- Deaths: None reported
- Injuries: None reported
- Cost: Unknown

Ignition
- Cause: lightning

The Salmon August Complex Fire was a large complex wildfire in Northern California that originally consisted of 11 separate wildfires, and charred 65,888 acres (266.64 km^{2}) in Siskiyou County. The first fire in the complex was ignited on June 25, 2017, by lightning, and the complex fire burned for nearly 4 months, before it was finally contained on December 8, 2017.

== The fire ==
On June 25, 2017, at 5:00 PM PDT, the Island Fire, the first fire in the Salmon August Complex, was ignited by lightning. In early August 2017, six other fires in the complex (the Wallow, Garden, Grizzly, Mary, Rush, and Pointers Fires) were ignited by lightning within a few days. Initially, these fires were managed with a confine-contain strategy. Although this strategy was initially effective, as weather conditions became hotter and dryer throughout mid-August, the Island and Wallow fires spread.

The Wallow Fire eventually engulfed the Pointers and Island fires, becoming the largest wildfire in the area, and began threatening Eco-Trust timber lands on State Responsibility Area. At that time, an Incident Management Team and CALFIRE began to work under unified command to combat the fires. All seven fires were incorporated into a complex on August 13, 2017, as the seven wildfires merged to form the Salmon August Complex Fire.

On September 7, 2017, three additional fires (the Deep, Claire, and Fourth Fires) ignited and quickly merged into the Salmon August Complex Fire. Great Basin Team 7 has successfully contained most of the fires within the Salmon August Complex by late September, and completed all Stage 1 repairs on the fires; suppression repairs began soon afterward. The fire transitioned to a Type 3 Incident management team on Thursday, September 28, 2017.

The Salmon August Complex Fire continued to burn over 2 more months, until the complex fire was fully contained on December 8, 2017. At the time of containment, the Salmon August Complex Fire had burned 65,888 acres (266.64 km^{2}) of land.

== See also ==
- 2017 California wildfires
