= Atwoods =

American home improvement retail chain

Atwoods Ranch & Home

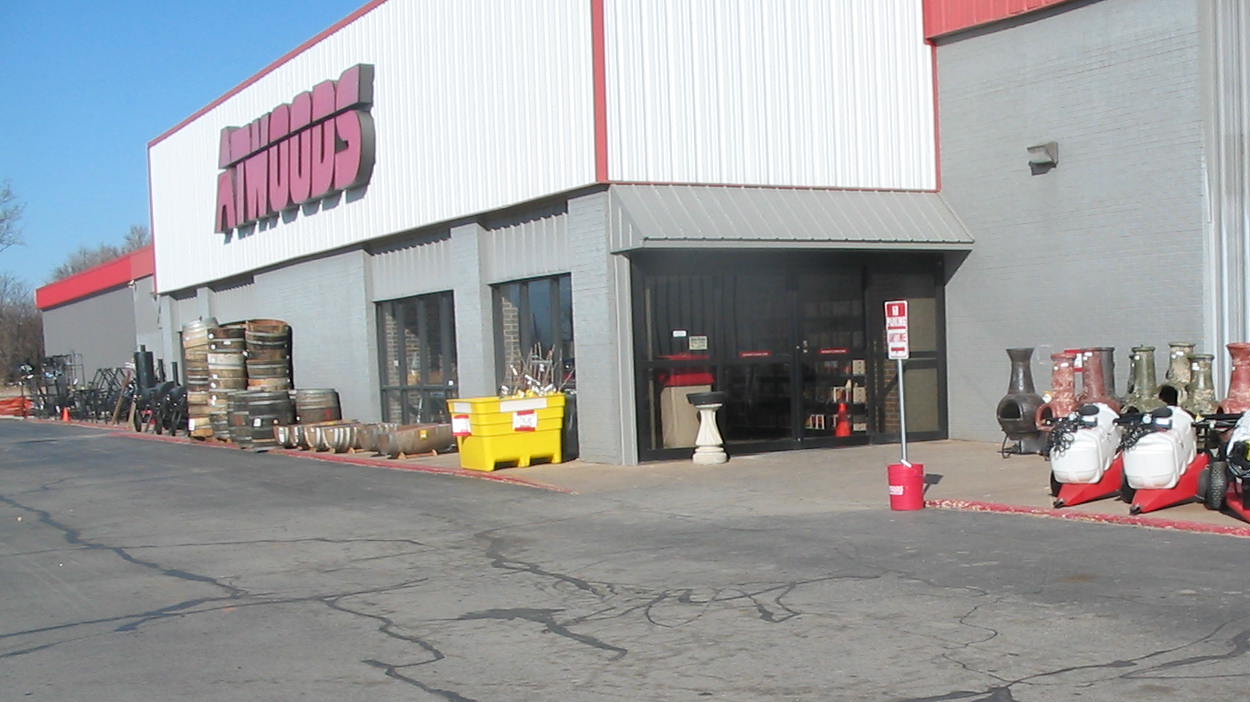
- Atwoods in Enid, Oklahoma
- Company type: Private; family business
- Industry: Retail
- Founded: 1960 (66 years ago) in Enid, Oklahoma, U.S.
- Founders: Wilbur and Fern Atwood
- Headquarters: Enid, Oklahoma, U.S.
- Number of locations: 82 (as of November 2025)
- Areas served: Arkansas; Kansas; Oklahoma; Texas; Missouri
- Products: Automotive goods, apparel, farm and ranch supplies, hardware, housewares, hunting equipment, lawn and garden supplies, paint, pet supplies, plumbing, sporting goods, tools
- Number of employees: 3,200 (2021)
- Website: www.atwoods.com

Atwoods Ranch & Home is a farm and ranch supply store chain based in Enid, Oklahoma, United States. Atwoods has 82 stores in five states: Arkansas, Kansas, Missouri, Oklahoma and Texas. Most of its stores are located in Oklahoma, Texas, and Arkansas. In addition to farm and ranch supplies, Atwoods stores sell clothing, lawn and garden items, tools, hardware, automotive supplies, sporting goods, pet supplies, firearms, and seasonal items.

== History ==
The Atwoods Ranch and Home Goods story started over 60 years ago with founders Fern and Wilbur Atwood. They had a simple American dream and were willing to see it through. It began with a trip from Minnesota nearly 1,000 miles south to start a new business based on sincere practices with a neighborly smile.

They landed in Enid, Okla., and opened their first store in 1960.

== Current Day ==
Atwoods is operated by Wilbur and Fern's grandson Brian Atwood, and Brian's son Preston Atwood. Enid, Oklahoma is home to the Corporate offices and northern distribution center, as well as a southern distribution center in Tyler, Texas.
