= 2017 California wildfires =

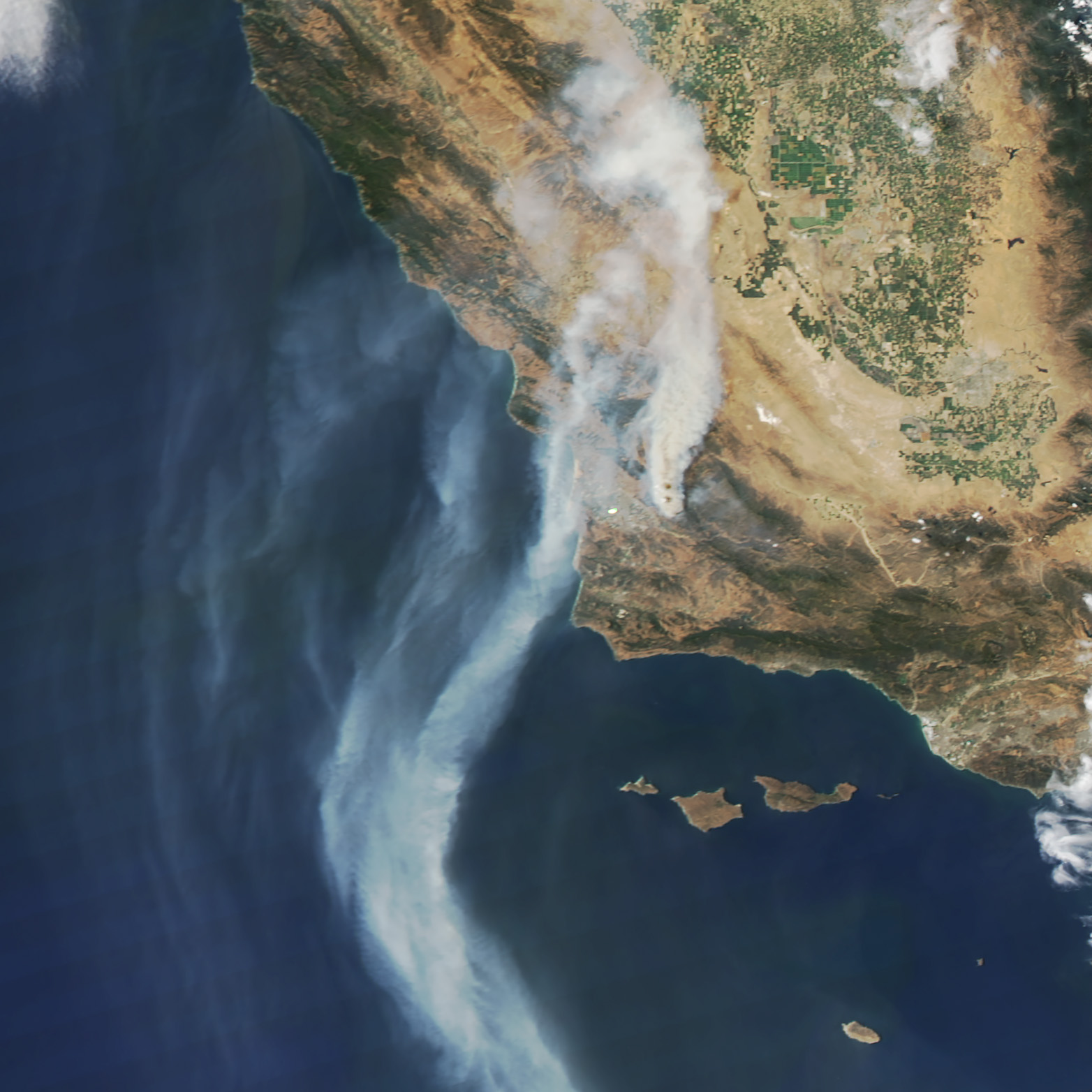
- Smoke from the Alamo and Whittier fires during the 2017 California fire season, on July 8, 2017.

Statistics
- Total fires: 9,560
- Total area: 1,548,429 acres (6,266.27 km^{2})

Impacts
- Deaths: 45 civilians, 2 firefighters
- Injuries: 12 firefighters, 199 civilians
- Structures destroyed: 10,280
- Cost: ≥$18.0 billion (2018 USD) (Second-costliest on record)

Map
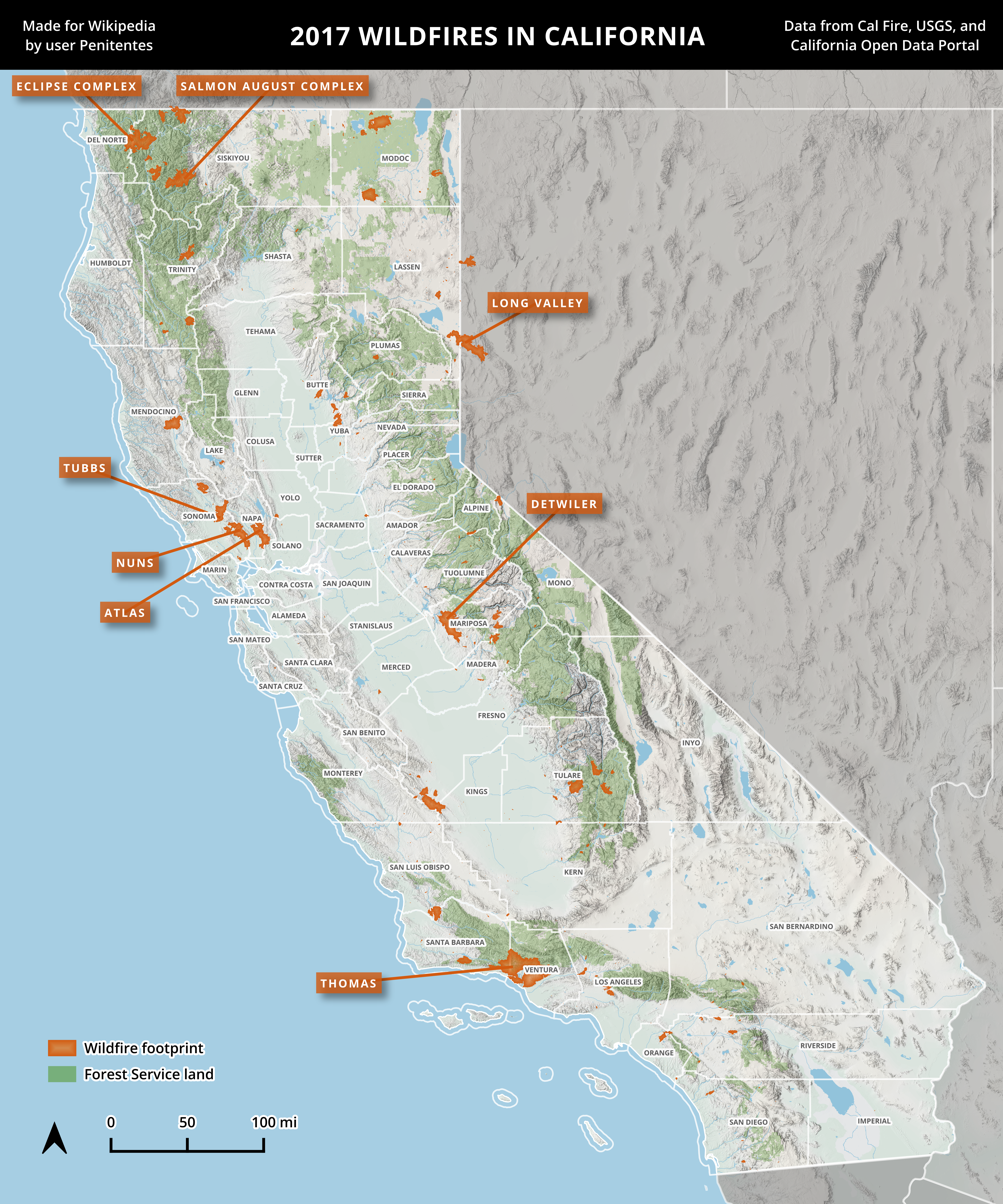
- A map of wildfires in California in 2017, using Cal Fire data

In terms of property damage, 2017 was the most destructive wildfire season on record in California at the time, surpassed by only the 2018 season and the 2020 season, with a total of 9,560 fires burning 1,548,429 acres (6,266.27 km^{2}) of land, according to the California Department of Forestry and Fire Protection, including five of the 20 most destructive wildland–urban interface fires in the state's history. Throughout 2017, the fires destroyed or damaged more than 10,000 structures in the state (destroyed 9,470, damaged 810), a higher tally than the previous nine years combined. State data showed that the large wildfires killed 47 people – 45 civilians and 2 firefighters – almost higher than the previous 10 years combined. The total property damage and total amount of burned land were both surpassed by the 2018 California wildfires.

Throughout the early months of 2017, there was heavy rainfall over most of California, which triggered widespread flooding, thus temporarily mitigating the state's historic drought conditions. However, according to a report published by the National Interagency Fire Center, the potential for large fires was "expected to remain near normal through the spring, but once fine fuels dry out, there will likely be a spike in grass fire activity."

In December 2017, strong Santa Ana winds triggered a new round of wildfires, including the massive Thomas Fire in Ventura County. At the time, the Thomas Fire was California's largest modern wildfire, which has since been surpassed by the Mendocino Complex's Ranch Fire in 2018. The December 2017 fires forced over 230,000 people to evacuate, with the 6 largest fires burning over 307,900 acres (1,246 km^{2}) and more than 1,300 structures.

During the year, 5 of the 20 most destructive wildfires in the state's history burned between October and December: #1 Tubbs, #6 Nuns, #7 Thomas, #11 Atlas, and #17 Redwood Valley. The wildfires collectively caused at least $18.0 billion (2018 USD) in damages, including $13.2 billion in insured losses, $3 billion in other economic losses, and $1.8 billion in fire suppression costs, making the 2017 California fires the second-costliest on record. The total economic cost, including fire suppression, insurance, direct and indirect economic losses, and recovery expenditures is estimated at $180 billion (2017 USD). This number includes economic harm to the wine industry, where several wineries in Napa and Sonoma were destroyed, and where many wine grapes were severely damaged by smoke. Cal Fire spent $700 million during fiscal year 2017, far exceeding the approximately $426 million the agency had budgeted that year for fire suppression. This made 2017 the most expensive firefighting year on record in California state history.

According to the National Oceanic and Atmospheric Administration, 2017 will be remembered as a year of extremes. It was the third-warmest year on record for the United States, and it was the second-hottest in California, bringing to the surface the question of long-term climate change and its contribution to the 2017 California fires. The hotter temperatures dry out vegetation, making them easier to burn, predisposing vulnerable regions like California to more wildfires in the coming decades as temperatures continue to rise and rainfall continues to decline. Historically, it has been estimated that prior to 1850, about 4.5 million acres (17,000 km²) burned yearly, in fires that lasted for months.

== Background ==
The timing of "fire season" in California is variable, depending on the amount of prior winter and spring precipitation, the frequency and severity of weather such as heat waves and wind events, and moisture content in vegetation. Northern California typically sees wildfire activity between late spring and early fall, peaking in the summer with hotter and drier conditions. Occasional cold frontal passages can bring wind and lightning. The timing of fire season in Southern California is similar, peaking between late spring and fall. The severity and duration of peak activity in either part of the state is modulated in part by weather events: downslope/offshore wind events can lead to critical fire weather, while onshore flow and Pacific weather systems can bring conditions that hamper wildfire growth.

== Wildfire maps ==
This section contains maps of the locations and burn areas of the fires that occurred during the largest outbreaks of the season. The burn areas of some major fires are included in some of the maps.

October 2017
Location of the California wildfires in October 2017

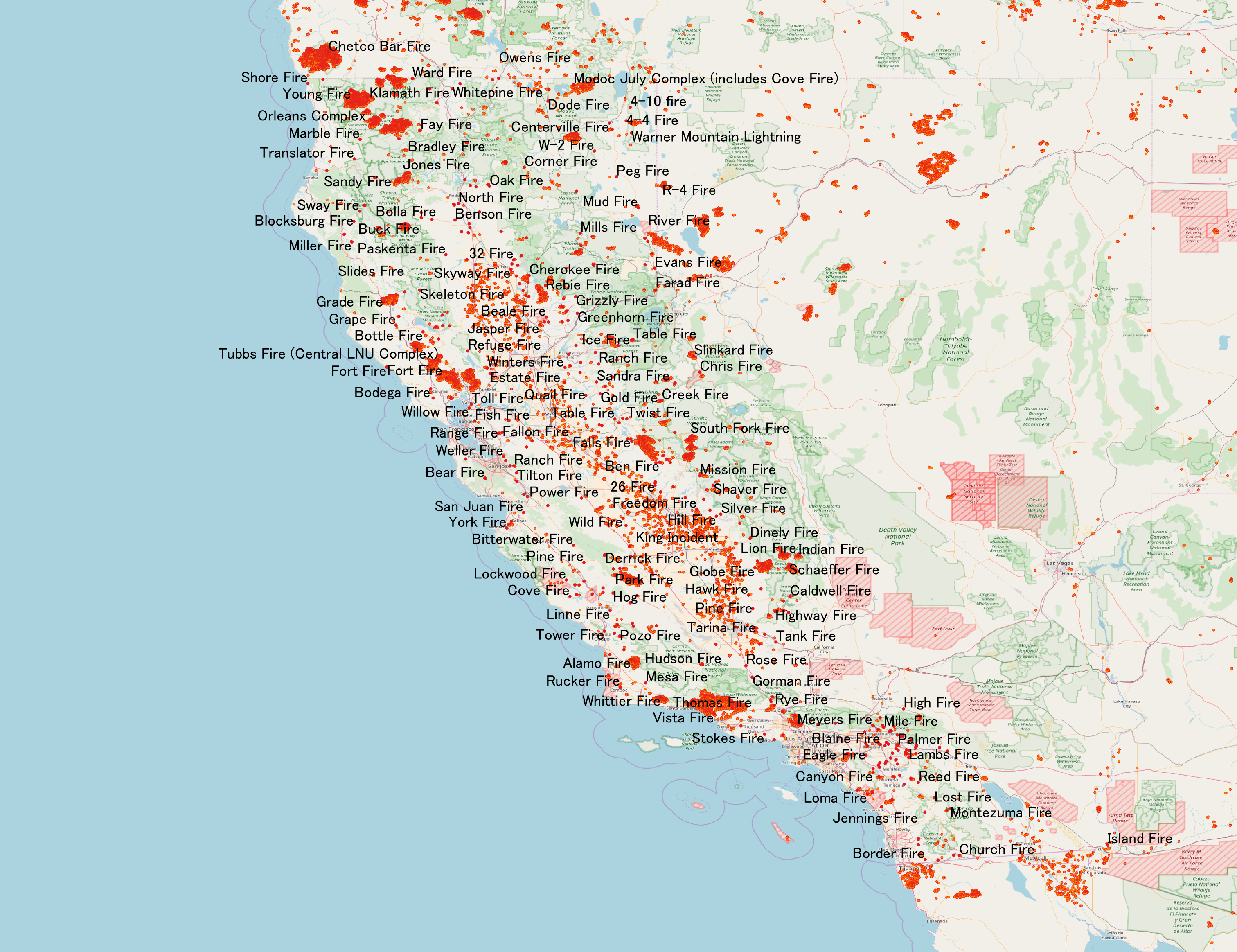
2017 California wildfires. Each dot shows the location (but not the extent) of a satellite-detected heat source. Click to enlarge.

December 2017
Location of the California wildfires in December 2017

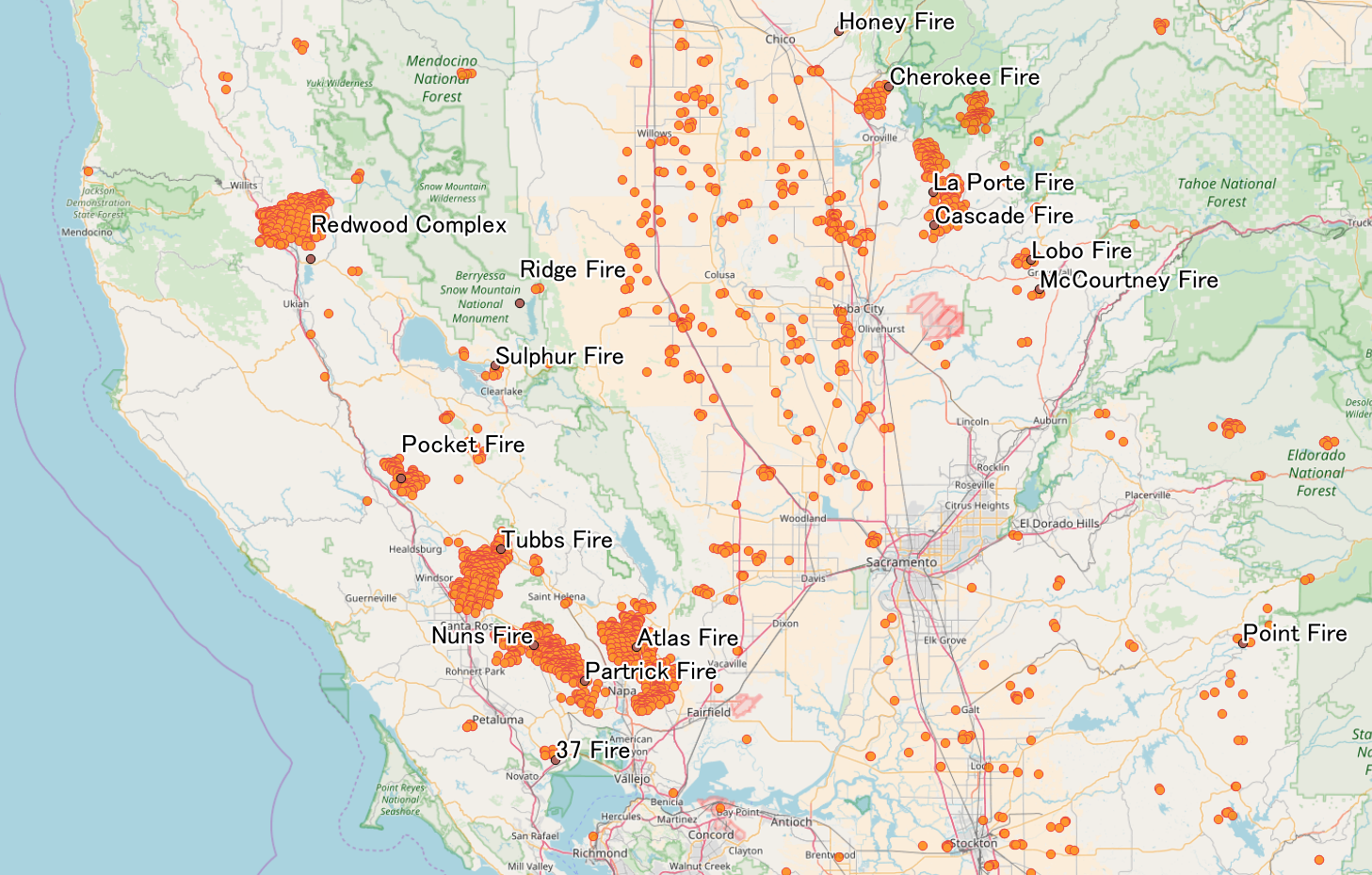
The 2017 Northern California wildfires, from January 1 to October 11.

== List of wildfires ==
Below is a list of all fires that exceeded 1,000 acres (400 ha) during the 2017 California wildfire season, as well as the fires that caused significant damage. The information is taken from CAL FIRE's list of large fires, and other sources where indicated.

Name	County	Acres	Start date	Containment Date (Note: Containment means that fire crews have established and secured control lines around the fire's perimeter. These lines are artificial barriers, like trenches or cleared vegetation, designed to stop the fire's spread, or natural barriers like rivers. Containment reflects progress in managing the fire but does not necessarily mean the fire is starved of fuel, under control, or put out.)	Notes	Ref
Jayne	Fresno	5,738	April 20, 2017	April 21, 2017		
Opera	Riverside	1,350	April 30, 2017	May 2, 2017		
Elm	Fresno	10,345	May 18, 2017	May 21, 2017		
Gate	San Diego	2,056	May 20, 2017	May 23, 2017		
Oakwood	Madera	1,431	June 10, 2017	June 13, 2017		
Highway	Kern	1,522	June 18, 2017	June 28, 2017		
Holcomb	San Bernardino	1,503	June 19, 2017	June 29, 2017		
Schaeffer	Tulare	16,031	June 24, 2017	August 10, 2017		
Salmon August Complex	Siskiyou	65,888	June 25, 2017	December 8, 2017		
Manzanita	Riverside	6,309	June 26, 2017	June 30, 2017		
Hill	San Luis Obispo	1,598	June 26, 2017	June 30, 2017	4 homes destroyed	
Winters	Yolo	2,269	July 6, 2017	July 12, 2017		
Alamo	San Luis Obispo	28,687	July 6, 2017	July 19, 2017	1 home destroyed, 1 damaged	
Wall	Butte	6,033	July 7, 2017	July 17, 2017	41 homes, 48 outbuildings destroyed, 10 damaged	
Whittier	Santa Barbara	18,430	July 8, 2017	October 5, 2017	16 homes, 30 outbuildings destroyed, 7 damaged	
Parkfield	Monterey	1,816	July 8, 2017	July 11, 2017		
Garza	Fresno	48,889	July 9, 2017	July 21, 2017	1 structure destroyed	
Long Valley	Lassen	83,733	July 11, 2017	July 21, 2017		
Detwiler	Mariposa	81,826	July 16, 2017	August 24, 2017	63 homes, 68 structures destroyed (131 total), 21 damaged	
Modoc July Complex	Modoc	83,120	July 24, 2017	August 16, 2017		
Orleans Complex	Siskiyou	27,276	July 25, 2017	September 26, 2017		
Empire	Mariposa	6,370	August 1, 2017	November 27, 2017		
Parker 2	Modoc	7,697	August 3, 2017	August 29, 2017		
Young	Siskiyou	2,500	August 7, 2017	August 28, 2017	Merged into the Eclipse Complex's Oak fire	
South Fork	Mariposa	7,000	August 13, 2017	November 27, 2017		
Blaine	Riverside	1,044	August 13, 2017	August 16, 2017		
Eclipse Complex	Siskiyou	78,698	August 15, 2017	November 29, 2017		
Pier	Tulare	36,556	August 29, 2017	November 29, 2017		
Railroad	Madera	12,407	August 29, 2017	October 24, 2017	5 homes, 9 structures destroyed	
Ponderosa	Butte	4,016	August 29, 2017	September 9, 2017	32 homes, 22 outbuildings, 15 damaged	
Mud	Lassen	6,042	August 29, 2017	September 1, 2017		
Slinkard	Mono	8,925	August 29, 2017	September 12, 2017		
Helena	Trinity	21,846	August 30, 2017	November 15, 2017	133 structures destroyed	
La Tuna	Los Angeles	7,194	September 1, 2017	September 9, 2017	5 homes, 5 structures destroyed	
Palmer	Riverside	3,874	September 2, 2017	September 6, 2017		
Mission	Madera	1,035	September 3, 2017	September 13, 2017	4 structures destroyed	
Buck	Trinity	13,417	September 12, 2017	November 20, 2017		
Lion	Tulare	18,900	September 24, 2017	December 2, 2017		
Canyon	Riverside	2,662	September 25, 2017	October 4, 2017	6 structures damaged	
Cherokee	Butte	8,417	October 8, 2017	October 16, 2017		
Atlas	Napa/Solano	51,624	October 8, 2017	October 31, 2017	6 fatalities, 785 structures destroyed, 40 damaged	
Tubbs	Napa/Sonoma	36,807	October 8, 2017	October 31, 2017	22 fatalities, 1 injured, 5,643 structures destroyed	
Nuns	Sonoma	56,556	October 8, 2017	October 30, 2017	Merged with the Norrbom, Adobe, Partrick, Pressley, and Oakmont Fires. 3 fatalities, 1,200 structures destroyed	
Redwood Valley	Mendocino	36,523	October 8, 2017	October 28, 2017	9 fatalities, 43 injured, 545 structures destroyed	
La Porte	Butte	6,151	October 9, 2017	October 18, 2017		
Cascade	Yuba	9,989	October 9, 2017	October 18, 2017	4 fatalities, 143 residential, 123 outbuildings destroyed	
Sulphur	Lake	2,207	October 9, 2017	October 26, 2017	150 structures destroyed	
Canyon 2	Orange	9,217	October 9, 2017	October 18, 2017	25 structures destroyed, 55 structures damaged	
37	Sonoma	1,660	October 9, 2017	October 13, 2017		
Pocket	Sonoma	17,357	October 9, 2017	October 31, 2017		
Lobo	Nevada	821	October 9, 2017	October 18, 2017	At least 30 structures destroyed	
Bear	Santa Cruz	391	October 16, 2017	October 27, 2017	7 injuries, 4 structures destroyed	
Buffalo Fire	San Diego	1,088	October 17, 2017	November 14, 2017	Burned on Camp Pendleton.	
Wildomar	Riverside	866	October 27, 2017	October 29, 2017		
Thomas	Ventura/Santa Barbara	281,893	December 4, 2017	January 12, 2018	1,063 structures destroyed, 280 structures damaged, 2 firefighters injured, 1 firefighter and 1 civilian killed	
Creek	Los Angeles	15,619	December 5, 2017	January 9, 2018	123 buildings destroyed, 81 buildings damaged, 3 firefighters injured	
Rye	Los Angeles	6,049	December 5, 2017	December 12, 2017	6 buildings destroyed, 3 structures damaged, 1 firefighter injured	
Little Mountain	San Bernardino	260	December 5, 2017	December 7, 2017	3 injuries	
Skirball	Los Angeles	422	December 6, 2017	December 15, 2017	6 structures destroyed, 12 structures damaged, 3 firefighters injured	
Lilac	San Diego	4,100	December 7, 2017	December 16, 2017	157 structures destroyed, 64 structures damaged, 3 firefighters and 4 civilians injured	
Liberty	Riverside	300	December 7, 2017	December 9, 2017	7 structures destroyed	

== October Northern California wildfires ==
During the month of October, a series of wildfires broke out throughout Napa, Lake, Sonoma, Mendocino, and Butte counties during severe fire weather conditions, effectively leading to a major red flag warning from much of the northern California area. In the extreme conditions, small fires quickly grew to become massive conflagrations spanning from 1,000 to well over 20,000 acres within a single day. The fires destroyed an estimated 8,900 structures, killed at least 44 people, burned over 245,000 acres (99,148 ha) of land, and forced over 20,000 people to evacuate.

== December Southern California wildfires ==
Multiple wildfires ignited in December across Los Angeles, San Bernardino, Ventura, San Diego, Riverside, Santa Barbara Counties. The fires were exacerbated by unusually powerful and long-lasting Santa Ana winds as well as large amounts of dry vegetation grown, due to large amounts of precipitation earlier in the year. The fires burned over 307,900 acres (1,246 km^{2}), and caused traffic disruptions, school closures, hazardous air quality conditions, and massive power outages. California Governor Jerry Brown declared a state of emergency in Ventura and Los Angeles Counties, and Los Angeles Mayor Eric Garcetti declared a state of emergency for the city. The largest fire was the Thomas Fire, which grew to 281,893 acres, becoming California's largest modern wildfire at the time, since surpassed by the Mendocino Complex's Ranch Fire in 2018.

== See also ==
- List of California wildfires
- May 2014 San Diego County wildfires
- 2008 California wildfires
- October 2007 California wildfires
- 2017 California floods
- Climate change in California
