= Forbestown, California =

Forbestown
- Census-designated place
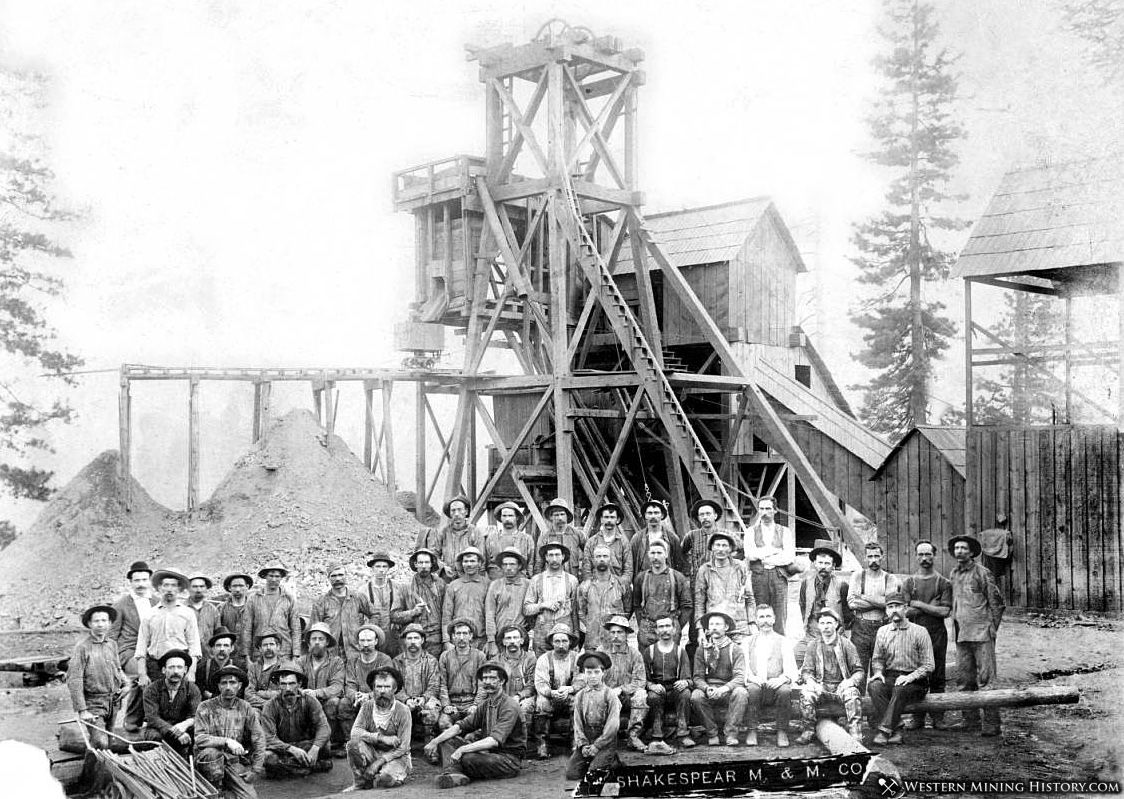
- Shakespeare Mining & Milling Co, headframe and miners, ca. 1860

- Location of Forbestown in Butte County, California.

- Location in California Forbestown (the United States)
- Coordinates: 39°31′02″N 121°16′02″W
- Country: United States
- State: California
- County: Butte

Area
  - Total: 6.280 sq mi (16.266 km^{2})
  - Land: 6.274 sq mi (16.250 km^{2})
  - Water: 0.0058 sq mi (0.015 km^{2}) 0.09%
- Elevation: 2,772 ft (845 m)

Population (2020)
  - Total: 396
  - Density: 63.1/sq mi (24.4/km^{2})
- Time zone: UTC-8 (Pacific (PST))
  - Summer (DST): UTC-7 (PDT)
- GNIS feature IDs: 1656023; 2612480

Forbestown (formerly, Boles Dry Diggins and Forbes Diggins) is a census-designated place in Butte County, California, United States. It lies at an elevation of 2772 feet (845 m). Its zip code is 95941 and its area code is 530. Forbestown had a population of 396 at the 2020 census.

Forbestown is named for B.F. Forbes, who opened a store there in 1850. The post office was established in 1854, closed in 1925, and re-opened in 1936.

Forbestown's heyday was the last half of the nineteenth century, when it was a large mining center. By the late 1930s, it was nearly a ghost town. The site has foundations and debris from its mining era.

== Demographics ==
Historical population
Census	Pop.	Note	%±
2010	320		—
2020	396		23.8%
U.S. Decennial Census; 2010

Forbestown first appeared as a census-designated place in the 2010 U.S. census.

The 2020 United States census reported that Forbestown had a population of 396. The population density was 63.1 inhabitants per square mile (24.4/km^{2}). The racial makeup of Forbestown was 310 (78.3%) White, 4 (1.0%) African American, 14 (3.5%) Native American, 2 (0.5%) Asian, 1 (0.3%) Pacific Islander, 12 (3.0%) from other races, and 53 (13.4%) from two or more races. Hispanic or Latino of any race were 45 persons (11.4%).

The whole population lived in households. There were 163 households, out of which 35 (21.5%) had children under the age of 18 living in them, 72 (44.2%) were married-couple households, 10 (6.1%) were cohabiting couple households, 35 (21.5%) had a female householder with no partner present, and 46 (28.2%) had a male householder with no partner present. 55 households (33.7%) were one person, and 37 (22.7%) were one person aged 65 or older. The average household size was 2.43. There were 99 families (60.7% of all households).

The age distribution was 96 people (24.2%) under the age of 18, 23 people (5.8%) aged 18 to 24, 72 people (18.2%) aged 25 to 44, 120 people (30.3%) aged 45 to 64, and 85 people (21.5%) who were 65 years of age or older. The median age was 48.2 years. For every 100 females, there were 131.6 males.

There were 188 housing units at an average density of 30.0 units per square mile (11.6 units/km^{2}), of which 163 (86.7%) were occupied. Of these, 145 (89.0%) were owner-occupied, and 18 (11.0%) were occupied by renters.

== Government ==
In the California State Legislature, Forbestown is in the 1st senatorial district, represented by Republican Megan Dahle, and the 3rd Assembly district, represented by Vacant.

In the United States House of Representatives, Forbestown is in California's 1st congressional district, represented by Republican James Gallagher.

== Education ==
The CDP is served by the Marysville Joint Unified School District.

== Gallery ==
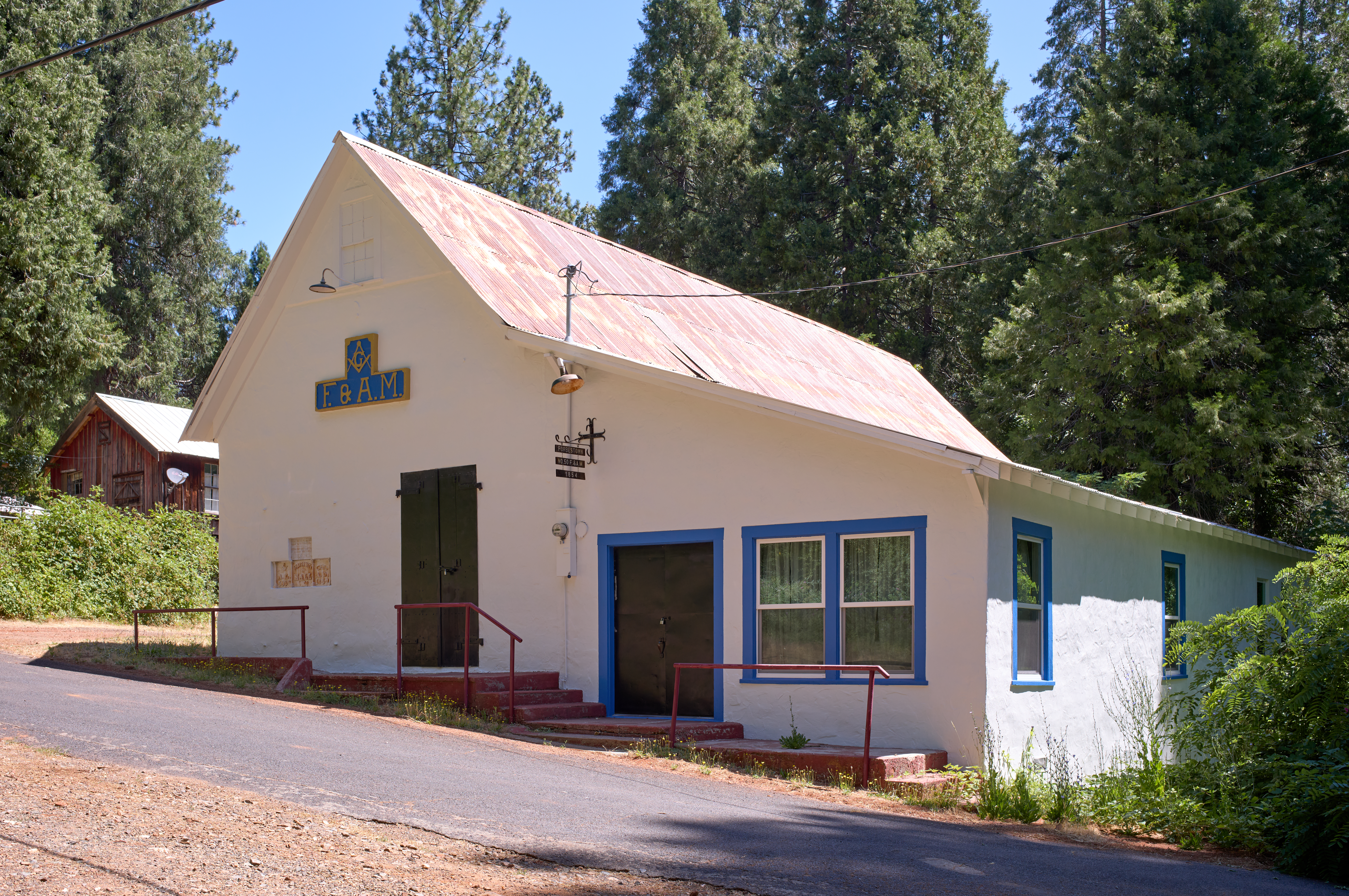
The Forbestown Masonic Lodge in July 2025

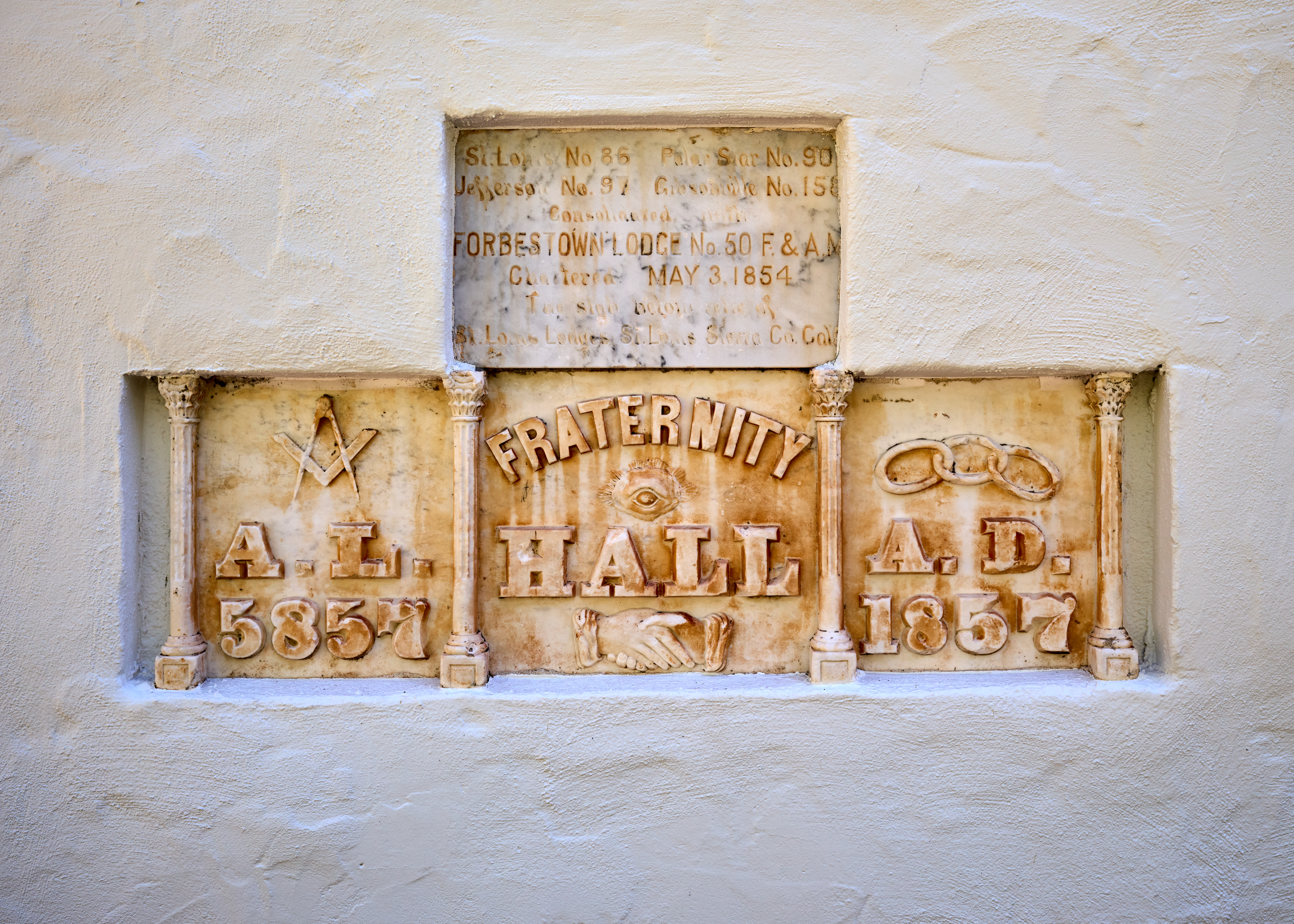
Sign on the front façade of the Masonic Lodge

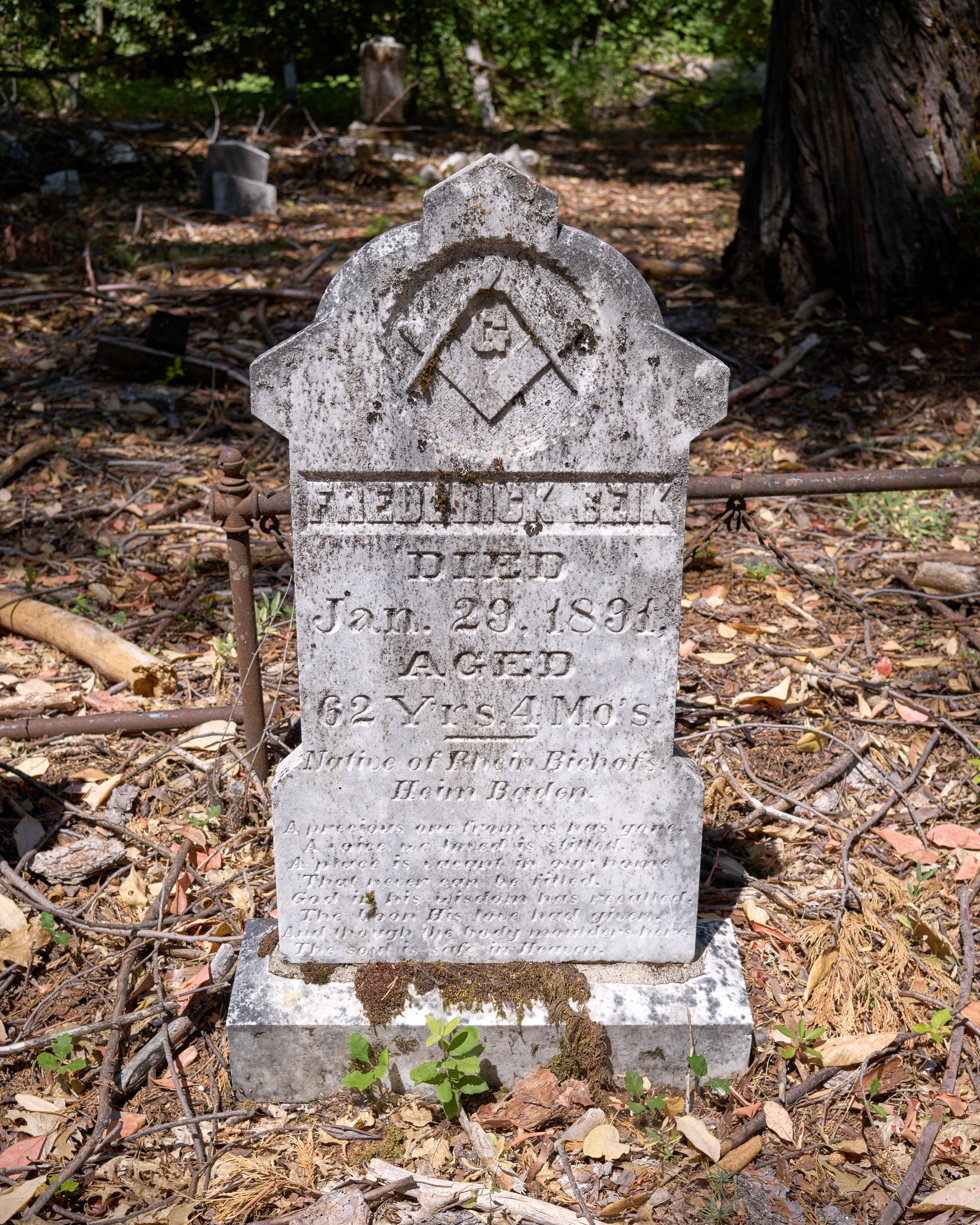
Grave of a German immigrant in the old pioneer cemetery

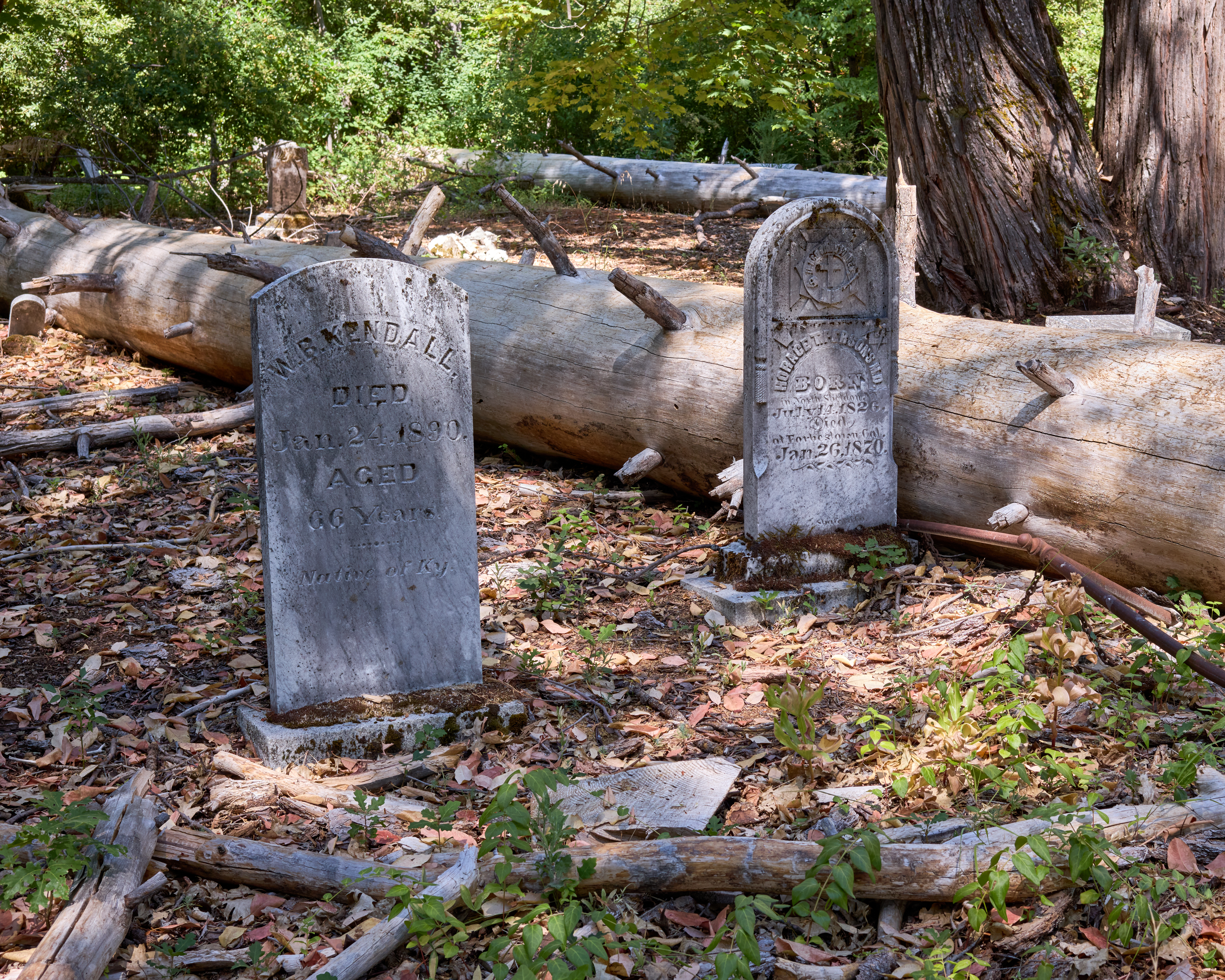
Graves in the old pioneer cemetery

== See also ==
- Ponderosa Fire, 2017
- North Complex Fire, 2020
