= Killing of Dexter Reed =

Police shooting in Chicago, Illinois

- Date: March 21, 2024; 2 years ago
- Location: Humboldt Park, Chicago, Illinois, U.S.
- Type: Homicide by shooting
- Deaths: 1

On March 21, 2024, Dexter Reed, a 26-year-old man, was shot and killed by officers of the Chicago Police Department (CPD) in Humboldt Park, Chicago, United States. Reed fired his illegally owned handgun and injured a police officer during a traffic stop, then police returned fire, discharging a number of rounds at Reed.

== Incident ==
The shooting occurred after a traffic stop where plainclothes officers pulled Reed over. Police initially stated he was pulled over for not wearing a seat belt, but they later said he was pulled over for having illegally-tinted windows. An officer told Reed to roll down his car window and asked Reed what he was doing. Reed initially rolled the car window down, but then rolled it back up, and the officer repeatedly told him not to. The officer also told Reed to unlock the car door. According to the Civilian Office of Police Accountability, Reed then shot at the officers, which resulted in the officers shooting him in return, firing 96 shots in total in the span of 41 seconds. Reed and four of the officers were transported to hospitals for treatment. Reed later died from his wounds. A handgun was located in the passenger's seat of Reed's vehicle, along with 11 spent bullet casings.

== Dexter Reed ==
Reed had been shot in August 2021, and afterwards suffered PTSD, short-term memory loss, slurred speech, and blindness in one eye. In 2023, Reed was charged with possession of a firearm with a revoked FOID card, and three counts of aggravated unlawful use of a weapon; he was on pretrial release at the time of the shooting.

== Response ==
On April 9, 2024, Chicago Mayor Brandon Johnson said, "Shooting a police officer can never be condoned, never excused. I will never stand for that, and neither will the city of Chicago".

CPD Superintendent Larry Snelling said he would not strip the involved officers of their police powers before the investigation.

== Civil rights lawsuit and settlement ==
On April 24, 2024, Reed's family filed a federal civil rights lawsuit against the city, and the five officers. On February 6, 2025, Reed's family accepted an offer from the city of Chicago for a US$1.25 million settlement. However, the Chicago City Council rejected the settlement on April 11, 2025 with a 15–12 vote.
