= Dulzura, California =

Unincorporated community in California, United States

- Unincorporated community
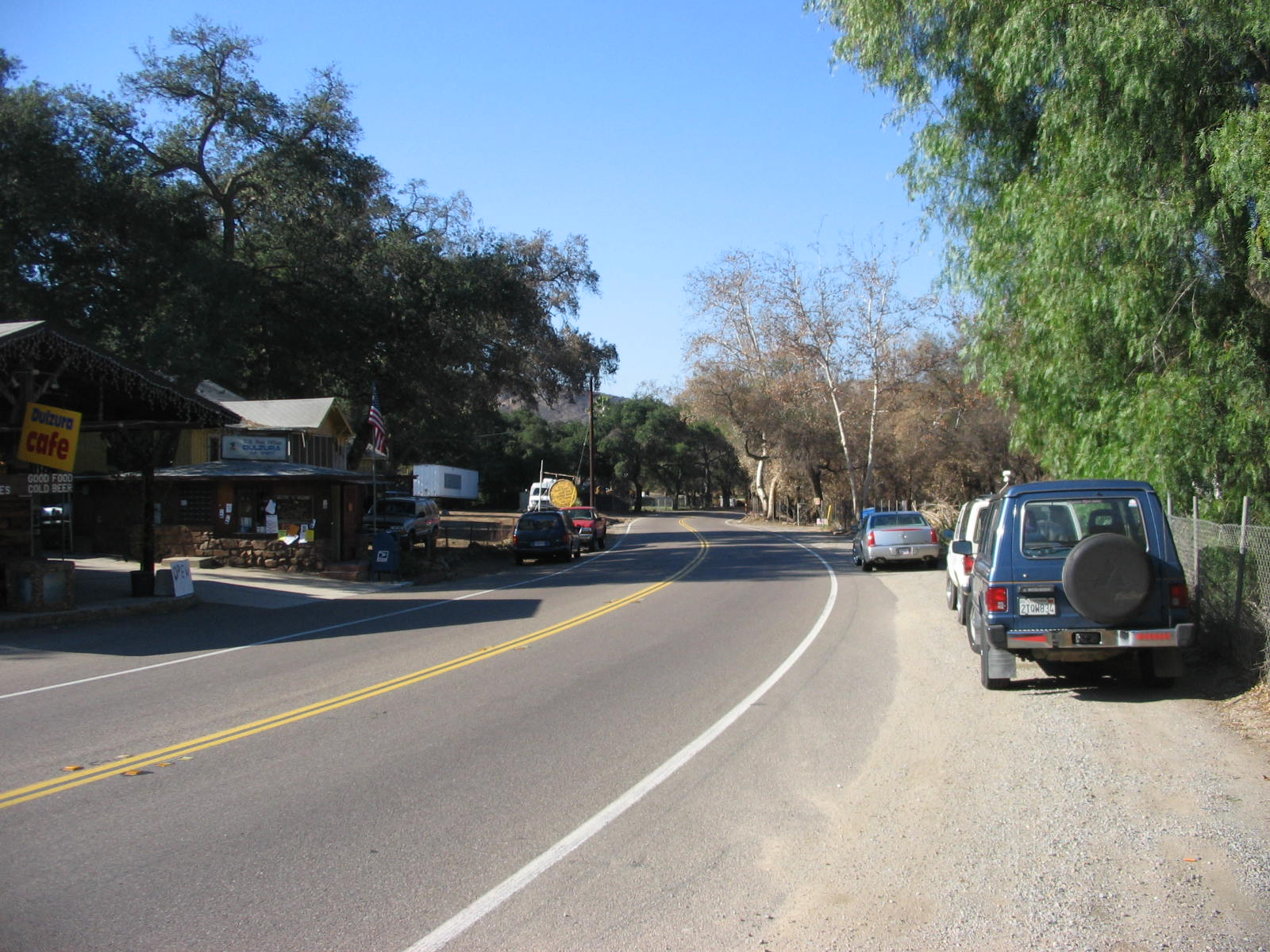
- Cafe and post office on Highway 94 in Dulzura

- Location within the state of California Dulzura, California (the United States)
- Coordinates: 32°38′39″N 116°46′50″W
- Country: United States
- State: California
- County: San Diego
- Time zone: UTC-8 (Pacific (PST))
  - Summer (DST): UTC-7 (PDT)
- ZIP codes: 91917
- Area code: 619

Dulzura (Spanish for "Gentleness" or "Sweetness"; Kumeyaay: Ha-pe-was) is an unincorporated community in San Diego County, California.

== Geography ==
The ZIP Code is 91917 and the community is inside area code 619. The community is largely rural and has a population of only about 700 people.

It is located 25 miles southeast of the city of San Diego, about 10 miles north of the Mexico–United States border, and on the east side of the San Ysidro Mountains.

== History ==
Dulzura was previously inhabited by a Kumeyaay village called Ha-pe-was in the Kumeyaay language.

The name of Dulzura was derived from the root Spanish word dulce ('sweet'); dulzura is another adjective to describe something as sweet, pleasant or having 'gentleness'. One theory suggests that the name was given in relation to the honey industry that had once prospered in the area circa 1869, and with the warmer and dry climate with its mild winters, the area was perhaps considered 'sweet' and 'gentle'.

Dulzura was the place-of-death for former Major League Baseball pitcher Eric Show. It was once best-known as the home of a local candied fruit delicacy known as Clark's 'Pickelized' Figs, produced on Clark Ranch by Frank and Lila Clark from 1908 to 1914; the figs were sold in small casks or firkins at grocery stores across the United States. The advent of World War I resulted in a sugar shortage, effectively ending the prosperous family business. Today, the Clark Ranch remains in the family name, with the original "Pickle House" now being the tasting room for Dulzura Vineyard & Winery.

The Dulzura Schoolhouse was a one-room educational landmark in the community, from the 1900s until it was closed in the 1950s.

== Climate ==
According to the Köppen Climate Classification system, Dulzura has a hot-summer Mediterranean climate, abbreviated "Csa" on climate maps.
