= Charles M. Teague =

American politician (1909–1974)

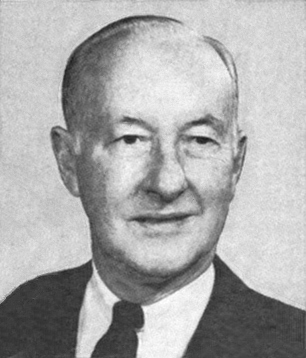

Member of the U.S. House of Representatives from California's 13th district
- In office January 3, 1955 – January 1, 1974
- Preceded by: Ernest K. Bramblett
- Succeeded by: Bob Lagomarsino

Personal details
- Born: Charles McKevett Teague; September 18, 1909 Santa Paula, California, U.S.
- Died: January 1, 1974 (aged 64) Santa Paula, California, U.S.
- Party: Republican
- Spouse(s): Marjorie Cowden (d. 1970); Courtney Kempe Campbell
- Education: Stanford University
- Profession: Businessman, Lawyer

Charles McKevett Teague (September 18, 1909 – January 1, 1974) was an American lawyer and Republican Party politician who served as a member of the United States House of Representatives for California's 13th congressional district from 1955 until his death.

== Early life and family ==
Teague was born in Santa Paula, California, his family having long been involved in citrus farming. His father, Charles C. Teague, was a founder of Sunkist Growers, Incorporated and his brother Milton headed the organization for some time. He attended the public schools and graduated from Stanford University in 1931 and from Stanford Law School in 1934.

== Career ==
Teague was admitted to the bar in 1934 and in the United States Army Air Forces from 1942 to 1946, being awarded the Air Force commendation ribbon. He served as director of the McKevett Corp. and Teague-McKevett Co., firms later merged with Limoneira. At the time of his first run for Congress, he was president of the Ventura County Republican Assembly.

=== Congress ===
Teague was elected as a Republican representative in 1954. In the House, he served as ranking Republican on the House Agriculture Committee and was also a member of the House Veterans' Affairs Committee. Teague voted in favor of the Civil Rights Acts of 1957, 1960, 1964, and 1968, as well as the 24th Amendment to the U.S. Constitution and the Voting Rights Act of 1965.

== Family ==
His son, Alan, was mayor of Santa Paula.

== Death ==
On January 1, 1974, Teague was found dead at his home in Santa Paula, aged 64. He had died from an apparent heart attack overnight. He was cremated, and his ashes were interred at the Santa Paula Cemetery.

== Electoral history ==
1954 United States House of Representatives elections in California
Party	Candidate	Votes	%
Republican	Charles M. Teague	69,287	52.5
Democratic	Timothy I. O'Reilly	62,786	47.5
Total votes		132,073	100.0
Turnout			
Republican hold			

1956 United States House of Representatives elections in California
Party	Candidate	Votes	%
Republican	Charles M. Teague (Incumbent)	104,009	59.6
Democratic	William Kirk Stewart	70,567	40.4
Total votes		174,576	100.0
Turnout			
Republican hold			

1958 United States House of Representatives elections in California
Party	Candidate	Votes	%
Republican	Charles M. Teague (Incumbent)	98,381	57
Democratic	William Kirk Stewart	74,160	43
Total votes		172,541	100
Turnout			
Republican hold			

1960 United States House of Representatives elections in California
Party	Candidate	Votes	%
Republican	Charles M. Teague (Incumbent)	146,072	65
Democratic	George J. Holgate	78,597	35
Total votes		224,669	100
Turnout			
Republican hold			

1962 United States House of Representatives elections in California
Party	Candidate	Votes	%
Republican	Charles M. Teague (Incumbent)	84,743	64.9
Democratic	George J. Holgate	45,746	35.1
Total votes		130,489	100.0
Turnout			
Republican hold			

1964 United States House of Representatives elections in California
Party	Candidate	Votes	%
Republican	Charles M. Teague (Incumbent)	104,744	57.4
Democratic	George E. Taylor	77,763	42.6
Total votes		182,507	100.0
Turnout			
Republican hold			

1966 United States House of Representatives elections in California
Party	Candidate	Votes	%
Republican	Charles M. Teague (Incumbent)	116,701	67.5
Democratic	Charles A. Storke	56,240	32.5
Total votes		172,941	100.0
Turnout			
Republican hold			

1968 United States House of Representatives elections in California
Party	Candidate	Votes	%
Republican	Charles M. Teague (Incumbent)	148,357	65.9
Democratic	Stanley K. Sheinbaum	76,928	34.1
Total votes		225,285	100.0
Turnout			
Republican hold			

1970 United States House of Representatives elections in California
Party	Candidate	Votes	%
Republican	Charles M. Teague (Incumbent)	125,507	58.2
Democratic	Gary K. Hart	87,980	40.8
American Independent	Maude I. Jordet	2,339	1.0
Total votes		215,826	100.0
Turnout			
Republican hold			

1972 United States House of Representatives elections in California
Party	Candidate	Votes	%
Republican	Charles M. Teague (Incumbent)	153,723	73.9
Democratic	Lester Dean Cleveland	54,237	27.1
Total votes		207,960	100.0
Turnout			
Republican hold			

== See also ==
- List of members of the United States Congress who died in office (1950–1999)

U.S. House of Representatives
Preceded by Ernest K. Bramblett	Member of the U.S. House of Representatives from California's 13th congressional district 1955–1974	Succeeded by Robert J. Lagomarsino
