= California Historical Landmarks in Ventura County =

This list includes properties and districts listed on the California Historical Landmark listing in Ventura County, California. Click the "Map of all coordinates" link to the right to view a Google map of all properties and districts with latitude and longitude coordinates in the table below.

Image		Landmark name	Location	City or town	Summary
Grandma Prisbrey's Bottle Village	939	Grandma Prisbrey's Bottle Village	4595 Cochran St. 34°16′44″N 118°42′14″W	Simi Valley	
Hill of the Cross	113	Hill of the Cross	Grant Park; 34°17′05″N 119°17′46″W	Ventura	
Mission San Buenaventura	310	Mission San Buenaventura	211 E. Main St. 34°16′52″N 119°17′52″W	Ventura	Also on the NRHP list as NPS-75000496
Old Mission Reservoir	114	Old Mission Reservoir	Eastwood Park; 34°16′54″N 119°17′59″W	Ventura	Also on the NRHP list as NPS-75000496
Olivas Adobe	115	Olivas Adobe	4200 Olivas Park; 34°14′40″N 119°14′28″W	Ventura	Also on the NRHP list as NPS-79000570
Portolà Expedition	727	Portolà Expedition	Santa Paula Boys Club Rec Center; 34°21′21″N 119°03′03″W	Santa Paula	On August 11, 1769, the Portolá Expedition arrived at the junction of the Arroyo Mupu and Santa Paula Creek, at a place they named the Holy Martyrs Ipolito and Cassiano. The priests of the Mission San Buenaventura here established the Asistencia Santa Paula, where they held services for the Mupu Indians.
Rancho Camulos	553	Rancho Camulos	5164 East Telegraph Rd. 34°24′20″N 118°45′24″W	Piru	Also on the NRHP list as NPS-96001137
Rancho Simi	979	Rancho Simi	137 Strathearn Place; 34°16′28″N 118°48′04″W	Simi Valley	
San Buenaventura Mission Aqueduct	114-1	San Buenaventura Mission Aqueduct	234 Cañada Larga Rd. 34°20′32″N 119°17′27″W	Ventura	Also on the NRHP list as NPS-75000497
Stagecoach Inn	659	Stagecoach Inn	51 Ventu Park Rd. 34°10′41″N 118°54′41″W	Newbury Park	Also on the NRHP list as NPS-75000495
Sycamore Tree	756	Sycamore Tree	State Hwy 126 at Hall Rd. 34°22′44″N 118°59′23″W	Santa Paula	Between Santa Paula and Fillmore
Union Oil Company Building	996	Union Oil Company Building	1003 E. Main St. 34°21′15″N 119°03′32″W	Santa Paula	Also on the NRHP list as NPS-86002619
Ventura County Courthouse	847	Ventura County Courthouse	501 Poli St. 34°16′57″N 119°17′32″W	Ventura	Also on the NRHP list as NPS-71000211
Warring Park	624	Warring Park	700 block of Orchard St. 34°25′01″N 118°47′29″W	Piru	Portolá found Piru Indians tribe at site

== See also ==
- List of California Historical Landmarks
- National Register of Historic Places listings in Ventura County, California
- Ventura County Historic Landmarks & Points of Interest
- City of Ventura Historic Landmarks and Districts
