= SZP =

SZP can refer to:

- Sub Zero Project
- Santa Paula Airport
- Służba Zwycięstwu Polski
- Superficial Zone Protein
- Schizoid personality disorder
- Schizophrenia
