= Santa Paula Union High School District =

School district in Ventura County, California

Santa Paula Union High School District from around 1891 until July 2013 governed the Santa Paula High School and later the Renaissance (Continuation) High School, until the district merged with the Santa Paula Elementary School District to form the Santa Paula Unified School District of Santa Paula, California. In the 1920s, the district's board advocated for the establishment of a community college in Ventura County.

== Former trustees and superintendents ==
- Donald Teague, chairman (circa 1927)
- W.K. Cobb, superintendent (circa 1937)
