= Wallace Hardison =

American businessman (1850–1909)

Wallace Libby Hardison (August 26, 1850 – April 10, 1909) was a co-founder of the Union Oil Company of California, later known as Unocal. He later founded the Inca Mining Company and its subsidiary, Inca Rubber Company.

Hardison was born in Caribou, Aroostook County, Maine, the youngest of eleven children. He followed his brother, James Henry Hardison, to the oil fields of Western Pennsylvania. At first, they worked as field hands, but eventually befriended Milton and Lyman Stewart. Wallace Hardison also co-founded Limoneira a lemon processing company.

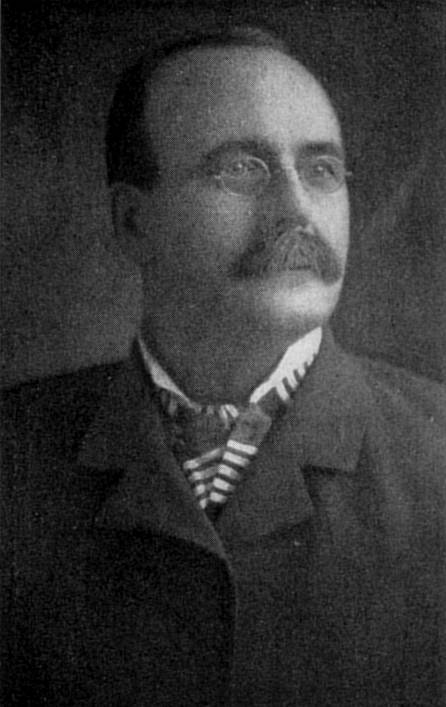
Wallace Hardison

== Union Oil Company of California ==
After John D. Rockefeller had effectively taken control of the Western Pennsylvania oil fields, Hardison and Lyman Stewart went to Santa Paula in Ventura County, Southern California in 1883 to develop newly discovered oil fields there. The original venture was called Hardison & Stewart Oil Company. A few years later, Stewart and Hardison joined forces with Thomas Bard and Paul Calonico to form the Union Oil Company of California.

Hardison eventually sold out his share of Union Oil and invested a portion of the proceeds to form Inca Mining Company, which controlled a Peruvian gold mine called the Santo Domingo. This new company had a subsidiary named the Inca Rubber Company, which collected rubber on land granted to them by a concession.

== Death ==
Wallace Hardison was killed when his car was struck by a train in Roscoe near Sun Valley, Los Angeles. in 1909.
