= Sycamore Tree (Santa Paula, California) =

Historic site in California, US

- Location: Highway 126 at Hall Road, 4 Miles East of Santa Paula, California
- Coordinates: 34°22′43″N 118°59′24″W

California Historical Landmark
- Designated: February 22, 1960
- Reference no.: 756

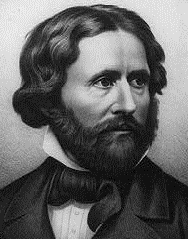
John C. Frémont

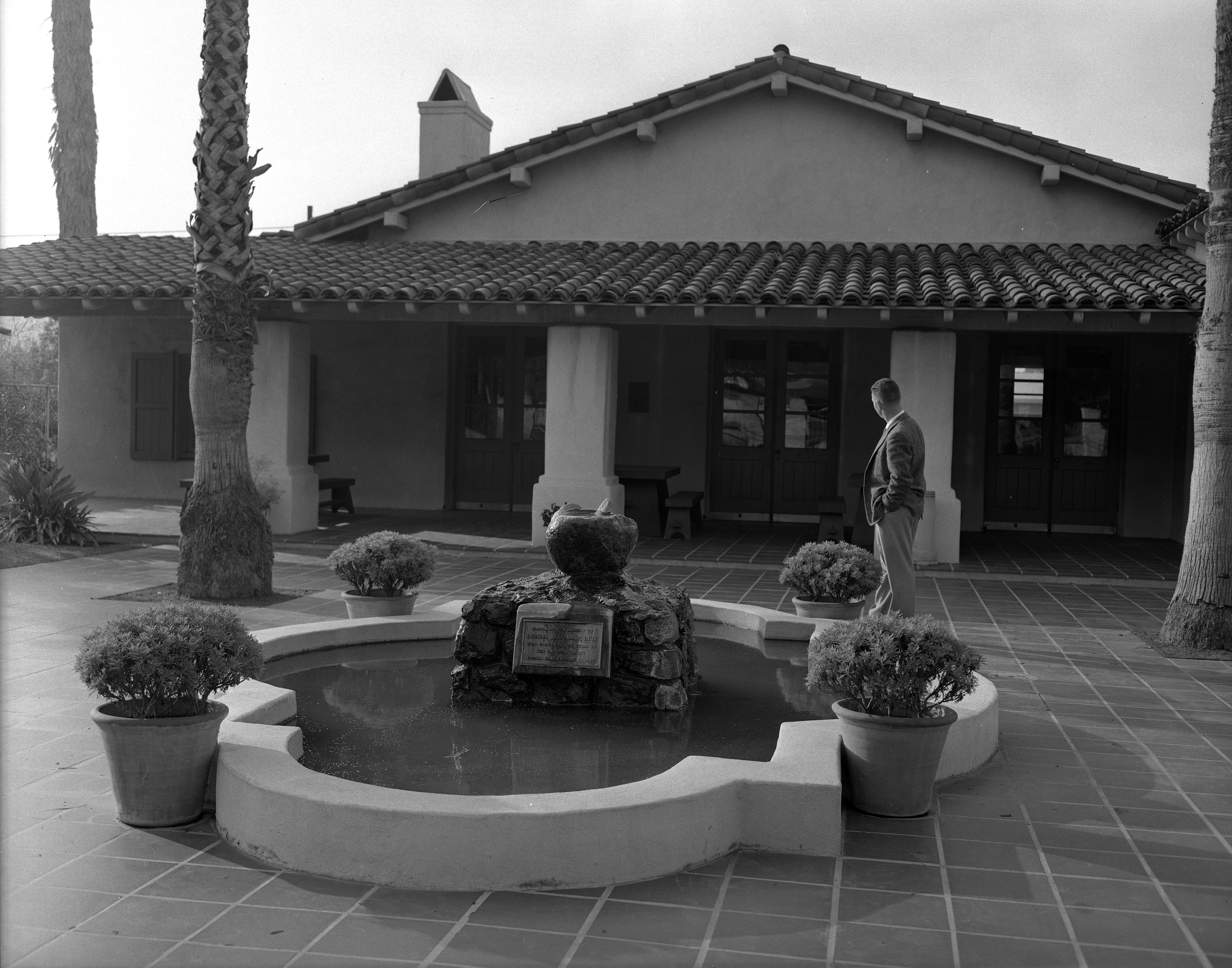
Campo de Cahuenga, scene of the signing of the Treaty of Cahuenga

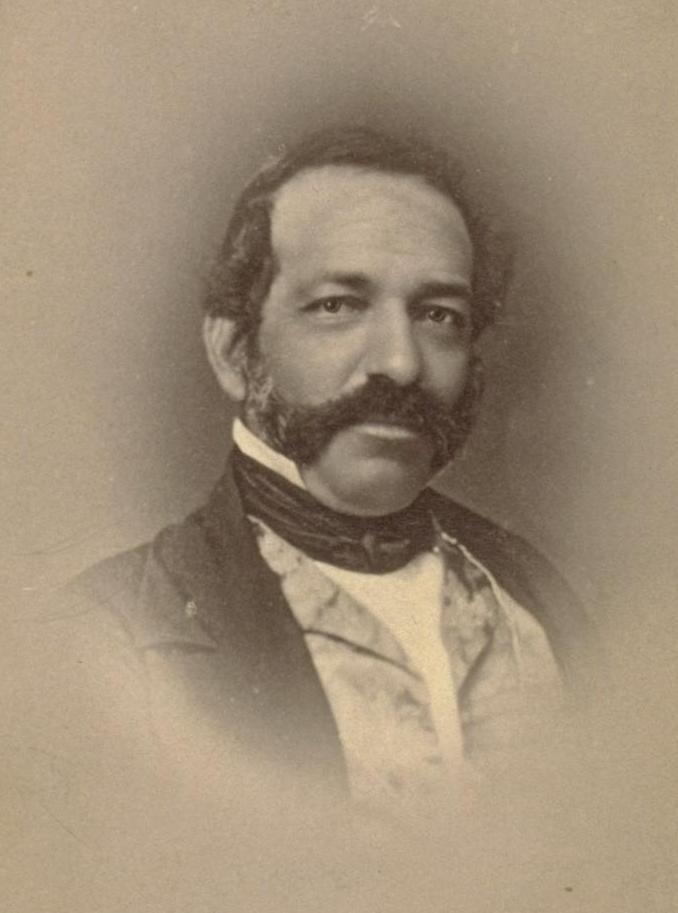
Andrés Pico

The Sycamore Tree is a historic tree used for many years as a special meeting place. The tree is located just off California State Route 126 in the middle of Hall Road, 4 Miles East of Santa Paula, California in Ventura County. Address is in the 3800 block of Sycamore Road, Fillmore, California, just north of the Santa Clara River. The site became California Historical Landmark number 756 on February 22, 1960. The tree has been used in the past as a polling place, Padres resting place on the El Camino Real, outdoor chapel and post office. In December 1846 General John C. Frémont passed the tree on his trip to sign a treaty with General Andrés Pico to secure California's annexation to the United States, called the Treaty of Cahuenga. The Treaty was signed on January 13, 1847, at Campo de Cahuenga in what is now Universal City, California.

The missing California Historical Landmark reads:

In 1846 General John C. Frémont passed this sycamore tree on his way to sign a treaty with General Andrés Pico to secure California for annexation to the United States. The tree has served as a resting place, a polling place, a temporary post office, and an outdoor chapel.

- While the marker missing, on Route 126 is a sign 500 feet before the tree.

== See also ==
- California Historical Landmarks in Ventura County, California
- List of Registered Historic Places in Ventura County, California
- Ventura County Historic Landmarks & Points of Interest
