= Warring Park =

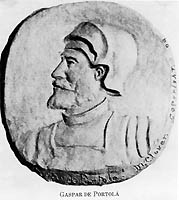
- Gaspar de Portolá
- Location: 822 Orchard Street, Piru, California
- Coordinates: 34°25′00″N 118°47′28″W

California Historical Landmark
- Designated: October 31, 1957
- Reference no.: 624

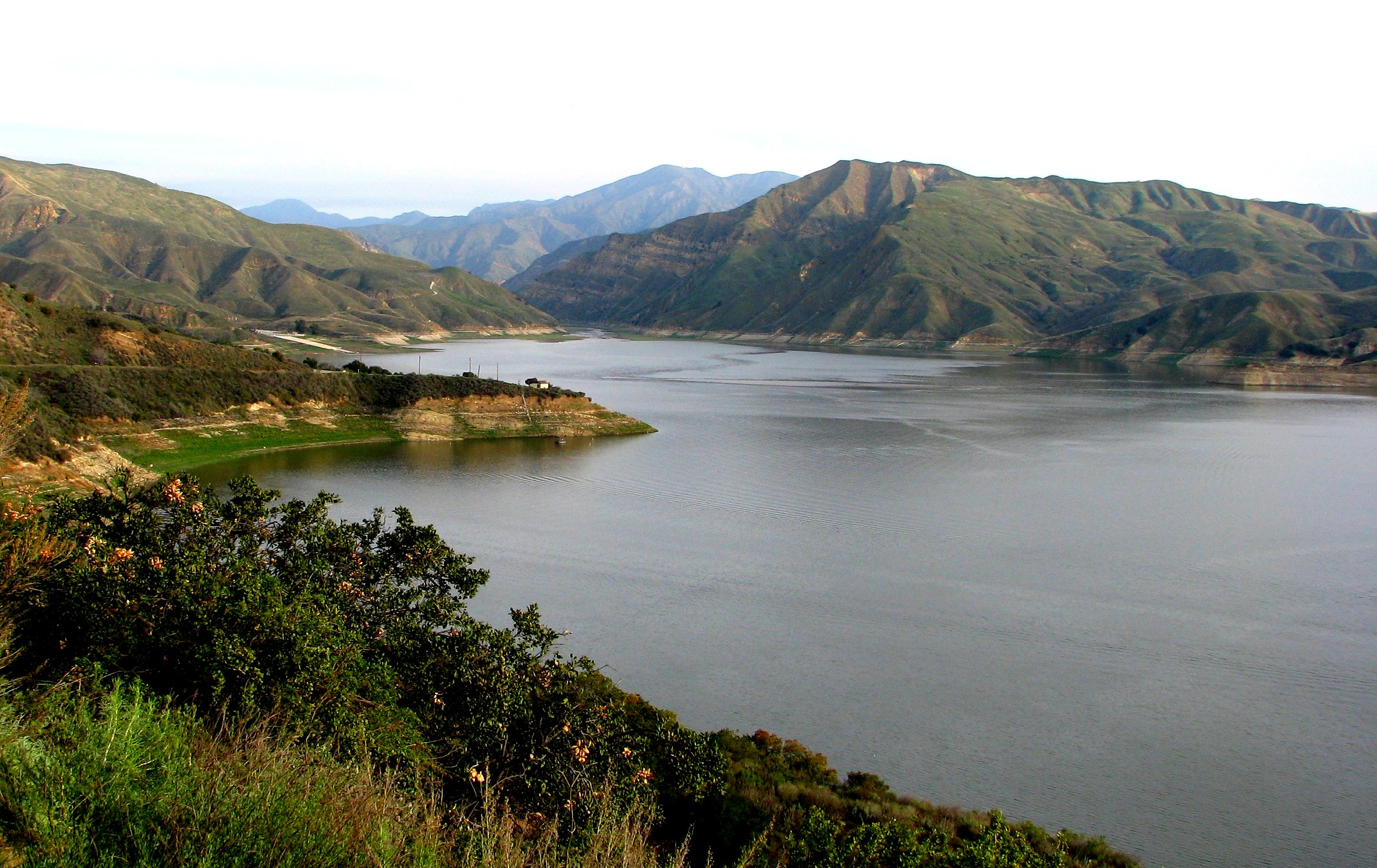
Lake Piru, 2009, near the home of the Piru Indian tribe

Warring Park is a California Historical Landmark as it is the site that Portolà expedition found the Chumash people group known as the Piru Indian tribe August 11, 1769. This site is in the current town of Piru, California in Ventura County. The site became California Historical Landmark number 624 on October 31, 1957. The Site is just west of Piru Creek and north of Lake Piru.

The Portolà expedition was a first Spanish voyage of exploration started in 1769 and ending in 1770. It was the first recorded European exploration of the interior of the present-day California. The leader was Gaspar de Portolà who became the governor of Las Californias. After the expedition, Spain founded Alta California. They built missions, Pueblos, and Presidio-forts.

The California Historical Landmark reads:

On August 11, 1769, the explorers and priests accompanying Portolá found a populous village of Piru Indians near this point. Carrying their bowstrings loose, the Indians offered necklaces of stones, in exchange for which Portolá presented them with beads.

== See also ==
- California Historical Landmarks in Ventura County, California
- List of Registered Historic Places in Ventura County, California
- Ventura County Historic Landmarks & Points of Interest
- Timeline of the Portolá expedition
