= Limoneira =

Agribusiness and real-estate company in California, USA

Limoneira Company
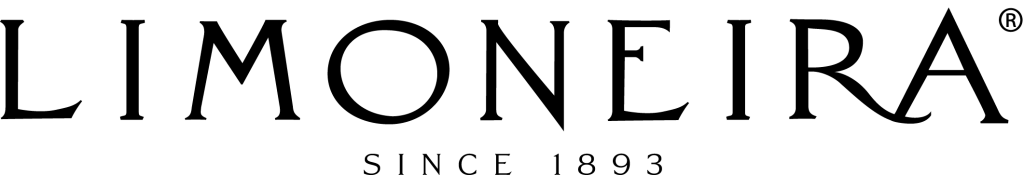
- Company type: Public limited
- Traded as: Nasdaq: LMNR; Russell 2000 Component
- ISIN: US5327461043
- Industry: Agricultural food products
- Founded: 1893
- Founders: Nathan W. Blanchard and Wallace L. Hardison
- Headquarters: 1141 Cummings Rd, Santa Paula, CA 93060,, United States
- Key people: Harold Edwards (President, CEO and Director)
- Services: Agribusiness, rental operations and real estate development
- Total assets: $362,510,483
- Website: limoneira.com

Limoneira is a public limited agribusiness and real estate development company based in Santa Paula, California, United States. The Company's operations mainly consist of production, sales and marketing of citrus and avocados. The company's real estate holdings and vast water rights support three business segments which are agribusiness, rental operations and real estate development. The company received the IPM Innovator Award at California Legislature Assembly Resolution.

It has repeatedly been called one of the largest lemon producers in the world including "one of the oldest citrus growing organizations of the West Coast", "the oldest ongoing citrus operation in California".

== History ==
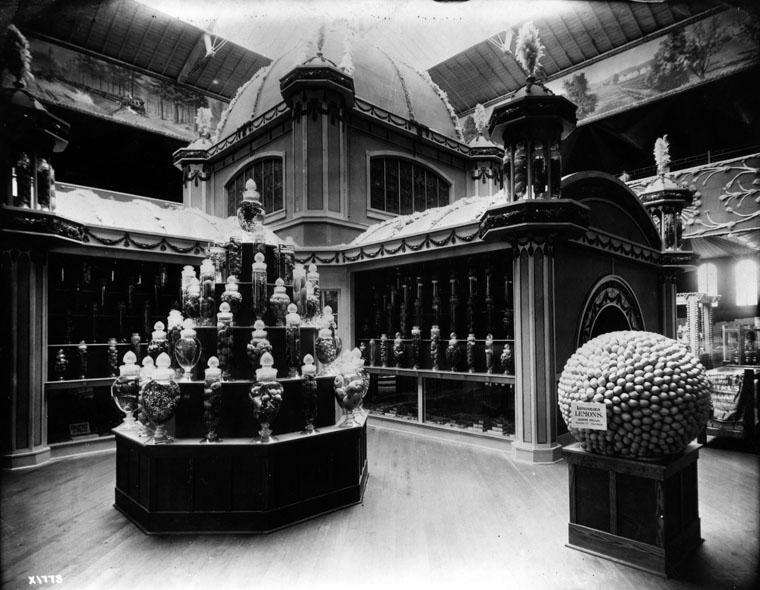
Limoneira's lemon exhibit (right) was featured at the Alaska–Yukon–Pacific Exposition in 1909

Limoneira was founded in 1893 at Union Oil Company Building in Santa Paula, California by Nathan Blanchard, Sr., one of the founders of Santa Paula, and Wallace Hardison. They started with 412.96 acres (167.12 ha) of land which over time would increase as the company grew. The year 1895 was a milestone for the company when it planted 690 orange trees, its first non-lemon product. By 1898 the company had nearly 50,000 trees, consisting of: 32,000 lemon trees, 3,000 grapefruit trees and 12,000 orange trees. This year, Blanchard also retired and appointed Charles Collins Teague as his successor.

The Limoneira plantation also had its own fire department, which still exists today and is one of the oldest continuously operating fire departments in Ventura County. In 1901, Limoneira achieved its first net profit and paid its first dividend to stockholders the following year. In 1907, Limoneira purchased the 2,300 acre Olivelands Tract, acquiring 1,000 acres of agriculture land for walnuts, olives, beans, corn and hay and, because it converted 1,300 to livestock grazing, the company also purchased the Santa Paula Horse and Feed Company the next year. In January 1908, the newspaper Ventura Free Press ran a story for Limoneira called "Greatest Lemon Ranch in the World", saying ""A further increase in the size of the largest lemon plantation in the world...will be the result of planting this season at the Limoneira Ranch. There are now...27,000 bearing lemon trees on the property, and this year trees will be on 300 acres more. The crop last year was the largest since the planting has begun..Bigness is not the chief end kept in view the management of the ranch. The growth of the enterprise, in fact, has come from never flagging efforts to maintain and improve the quality of the product. In addition to lemons, the ranch has 500 acres of walnuts".

By 1913, the company's growth was evident and the Santa Paula Chronicle said "The Lemoneira (sic) Company has demonstrated the wisdom of ample frost protection. The company will ship more than 450 cars of lemons this year, approximately one-third of the entire amount to be shipped from this State". By 1916, the company was battling Sunkist as both of them had nationally recognized products and Limoneira refused to exclusively brand their oranges as "Sunkist" but later reluctantly agreed.

By the 1920s, the company's acreage under cultivation had quadrupled in less than 30 years and numerous building and expansion projects were underway. It was the solid base created in the previous 30 years that pulled the company through the Depression and the challenges of the 1940s. In 1900, with Teague as the manager, he built the company into the state's largest citrus holding and the world's largest acreage. The company also joined the Southern California Fruit Exchange before pulling out a few years later and joining again in 1911.

The company also once set the record for deepest oil well in Ventura County before abandoning the well in 1949. The well like many others were in search of oil but oil was never found on Limoneira properties despite several companies participating in drilling, including Superior Oil Company, Richfield Oil Corporation, Humble Oil, Unocal Corporation and Standard Oil. Throughout its history, it has employed foreign labor including Japanese and Mexicans. In 1924, after the Immigration Act of 1924 which barred Japanese immigration, it particularly focused on Mexican labor. Since the 1970s, Limoneira has also been a leading lemon supplier to Japan and also distributes to Korea, China, Philippines and Thailand. In 1985, Limoneira partnered with Samuel Edwards Associates to become Limoneira Associates until Limoneira become one company again in 1990.

In 2005, Limoneira made a cross-equity agreement with Calavo Growers where Limoneira got a 6.9 stake of Calavo while Calavo got a 15.1 stake in Limoneira. In 2013, Limoneira acquired Associated Citrus Packers, Inc. of Yuma, Arizona for $18.6 million. In 2014, it acquired Marlin Ranching Company for $1.4 million.

== Overview ==
Limoneira Company operates as an agribusiness and real estate development company and is one of the largest growers and marketers of lemons in the U.S. and the largest grower of avocados in the U.S. The Company has 10,600 acres of agriculture and real estate property and significant water rights. Operations are in California, Arizona and Chile operates in Agribusiness, Rental Operations, and Real Estate Development.

=== Agribusiness ===
The Agribusiness segment grows lemons, avocados, oranges, and various specialty citrus fruits and other crops, such as Satsuma mandarin oranges, Moro blood oranges, Cara Cara oranges, Minneola tangelos, Star Ruby grapefruit, pummelos, pistachios, and olives, as well as pack and sell lemons grown by others. This segment sells and markets lemons directly to food service, wholesale, and retail customers. It has 3,900 acres of lemons; approximately 1,200 acres of avocados; approximately 1,500 acres of oranges; and approximately 800 acres of specialty citrus and other crops in Ventura and Tulare counties, California, and Yuma County in Arizona. The Company also has a 35% interest in Rosales S.A., a citrus packing, marketing and sales operation in La Serena, Chile. Limoneira owns two packing facilities-one in Santa Paula, California and the other in Yuma, Arizona.

=== Rental operations ===
The Rental Operations segment rents residential and commercial properties, such as office buildings and a multi-use facility consisting of a retail convenience store, gas station, car wash, and quick-serve restaurant. The Company also owns and rents 267 work force housing units and leases approximately 610 acres of land to third party agricultural tenants.

=== Real estate development ===
The Company is one of the largest land owners in Ventura County, California. The real estate development segment develops land parcels, multi-family housing, and single-family homes. The Company is developing East Area I and II in Santa Paula, a 550-acre master planned community with 1500 residential units, 500,000sf of commercial space and 150,000sf of light industrial space. Limoneira owns Windfall Farms in Creston California (San Luis Obispo County), a 720-acre, subdividable (76-10 acre Vineyard estate parcels) which has been planted with 100 acres of Cabernet Sauvignon wine grapes. The company owns three commercial parcels in Santa Maria, California with rights to develop 450 residential units.

== Sustainability ==
Limoneira employs sustainable practices in virtually each aspect of its day-to-day business and has made strategic investments in solar, water, soil and IPM (Integrated Pest management).

=== Solar ===
In 2008, Limoneira completed two state-of-the-art solar projects. The first, at company headquarters in Santa Paula, is a 5.5-acre photovoltaic orchard that generates a full megawatt of electricity. Representing one-third of the Company's total use. Solar energy powers Limoneira's lemon-packing house and storage facility. In the Tulare County town of Ducor, about 150 miles (240 km) north of Santa Paula, Limoneira installed four smaller solar arrays that together generate another full megawatt of electricity to power 250-horsepower motors that pump deep well water into reservoirs for the irrigation of 1,000 agricultural acres. It is estimated that, over their expected 25-year lifespan, Limoneira's solar generation of 84 million kilowatt hours will save at least 64,000 tons of greenhouse gases that would have otherwise been emitted by an ordinary oil- or coal-firing power plant.

=== Water rights ===
Through Limoneira's land position, historic water use, sustainable land use practices and by making investments in infrastructure, The Company has developed long-term, firm and reliable rights to water sufficient to meet any of The Company's land use objectives.

=== Organic recycling ===
In 2004, Limoneira Company partnered with Agromin to create an innovative organic recycling program. Agromin is a manufacturer of premium soil products and the green waste recycler for more than 50 communities cities in Los Angeles, Orange, Santa Barbara, and Ventura Counties. Limoneira and Agromin developed a 10-acre facility (4.0 ha) on Limoneira land to receive green materials (lawn clipping, leaves, bark, plant materials) from throughout Ventura County. The material is converted into mulch that is spread in Limoneira orchards to curb erosion, improve water efficiency, reduce weeds and moderate soil temperatures.

=== Integrated pest management ===
Limoneira was one of the founders of Associates Insectary. This grower-owned cooperative was formed in 1928 and provides pest control services to commercial citrus and avocado farmers. Beneficial insects are bred to control destructive agricultural pests. Limoneira maintains a complete Integrated Pest Management system to bring our sustainably-grown products to market.

== Achievements ==
- Received recognition from The White House.
- Received IPM Innovator Award at California Legislature Assembly Resolution.
- IPM Innovator award by California Environmental Protection Agency.
