= Santa Paula Unified School District =

School district in California, United States

Address
- 201 South Steckel Drive Santa Paula, California, 93060; United States

District information
- Type: Public
- Grades: K–12
- NCES District ID: 0601421

Students and staff
- Students: 5,081
- Teachers: 227.77
- Staff: 298.86
- Student–teacher ratio: 22.31

Other information
- Website: www.santapaulaunified.org

Santa Paula Unified School District is a public school district in Ventura County, California, United States. It was established in July 2013 from the merger of the Santa Paula Elementary School District and the city's high school, which was governed by the Santa Paula Union High School District. Many schools in Santa Paula, largely serving students from low-income families, are scoring low in state-administered tests, below the 30th percentile in statewide comparisons.

== Schools ==
Elementary

- Barbara Webster Elementary
- Thelma Bedell Elementary
- Blanchard Elementary
- Glen City Elementary
- McKevett Elementary
- Grace Thille Elementary

Middle

- Isbell Middle School

High

- Renaissance (Continuation) High School
- Santa Paula High School
