= Santa Paula Elementary School District =

School district in Ventura County, California

The Santa Paula Elementary School District, founded in 1876 with the opening of the first elementary school in Santa Paula, California, until its merger into the Santa Paula Unified School District on July 1, 2013, governed the city's elementary schools and middle school. In 1935, the board approved a tax levy that raised more funds for earthquake repairs.

Past members of the board of trustees and superintendents of the district were:

- Cecil Foster, trustee (1918-1926)
- George Bond, superintendent (circa 1938)
- R.E. Denley, superintendent (circa 1947)

== Schools (in 2013) ==
- Thelma Bedell Elementary School
- Blanchard Elementary School
- Glen City Elementary School
- Isbell Middle School
- McKevett Elementary School
- Grace Thille Elementary School
- Barbara Webster Elementary School
