= Santa Paula Airport =

General aviation airport in Santa Paula, California, United States

- IATA: SZP; ICAO: KSZP; FAA LID: SZP

Summary
- Airport type: Public
- Owner: Santa Paula Airport Association
- Serves: Santa Paula, California
- Elevation AMSL: 250 ft (76 m)
- Coordinates: 34°20′49″N 119°03′42″W
- Website: SantaPaulaAirport.com

Map
- Location of airport in California

Runways
Direction	Length		Surface
Direction	ft	m	Surface
4/22	2,665	812	Asphalt

Helipads
Number	Length		Surface
Number	ft	m	Surface
H1	60	18	Asphalt

Statistics (2023)
- Aircraft operations (year ending 11/6/2023): 97,000
- Based aircraft: 309
- Source: Federal Aviation Administration

Santa Paula Airport (IATA: SZP, ICAO: KSZP, FAA LID: SZP) is a privately owned, public use airport located one nautical mile (2 km) southeast of the central business district of Santa Paula, a city in Ventura County, California, United States. It exclusively serves privately operated general aviation aircraft with no scheduled commercial service.

== History ==
Santa Paula's first airport was originally established in 1927 when local rancher Ralph Dickenson purchased an OX-5 powered International biplane, cut a dirt airstrip on his ranch, and built a hangar. Dickenson Airport soon advertised airplane rides and flight lessons available.

Less than five months later, the Santa Clara Valley flooded following the collapse of the St. Francis Dam, killing many people and destroying acres of property along the Santa Clara River, where the ranch was built. Dickenson's hangar was found half a mile downstream with his airplane still inside. He moved it back, made repairs, and began flying again within a month.

In the following year, two more hangars were built as more locals began flying and purchasing aircraft. Recognizing the importance of having a community airport in the area, Dickenson and Dan Emmet obtained $1,000 from 19 local ranchers and purchased land south of the city of Santa Paula, adjacent to the river.

In 1930, following months of personal construction and development by these founders, the newly named Santa Paula Airport opened to the public with a lavish celebration of aerobatics, celebrity appearances, and aircraft.

This airport was also one of the favorite flying spots of actor Steve McQueen.

=== 2005 flood disaster ===
On February 21 and 22, 2005, the Santa Paula Airport was heavily damaged when the rain-swollen Santa Clara River ate into the airport property, destroying airplane tiedowns, ramps, and approximately 600 feet (180 m) part of the western one-third of the runway. The airport's only flight school, CP Aviation, temporarily moved to nearby Oxnard Airport as a result of the damage. Repairs began in March 2005 following the receding of the floodwaters, and as of February 2007, the airport was fully open to the public.

=== Thomas Fire ===
In December 2017, the Thomas Fire erupted and burned across Ventura and Santa Barbara counties. The Santa Paula Airport became a helibase for CAL FIRE by the morning after the fire started. The airport was outfitted as a base of operations for the water-dropping helicopters, and closed to all of the regular general aviation operations. About 23 helicopters began operating out of the airport, along with the necessary support crews, tanker trucks, and other equipment. In addition to water, brightly colored fire retardant was dropped on the fire from the air. During the first couple of weeks, there had been limited ability to use fixed-wing air tankers and VLAT (very large air tankers) to drop fire retardant, due to the smoky skies. After having been in the air all day, the helicopters underwent maintenance at night. Other activities included a daily briefing each morning, lunches, and distributing maps.

Many aircraft and their operations moved to other airports, such as Camarillo, which remained open to normal activities, while being involved in firefighting efforts. Amid all this, the Santa Paula airport was able to make one of its hangars available for cats after one of the local animal shelters was filled to capacity, and for one local family with its dogs for three nights, on its premises as well.

== Facilities and aircraft ==
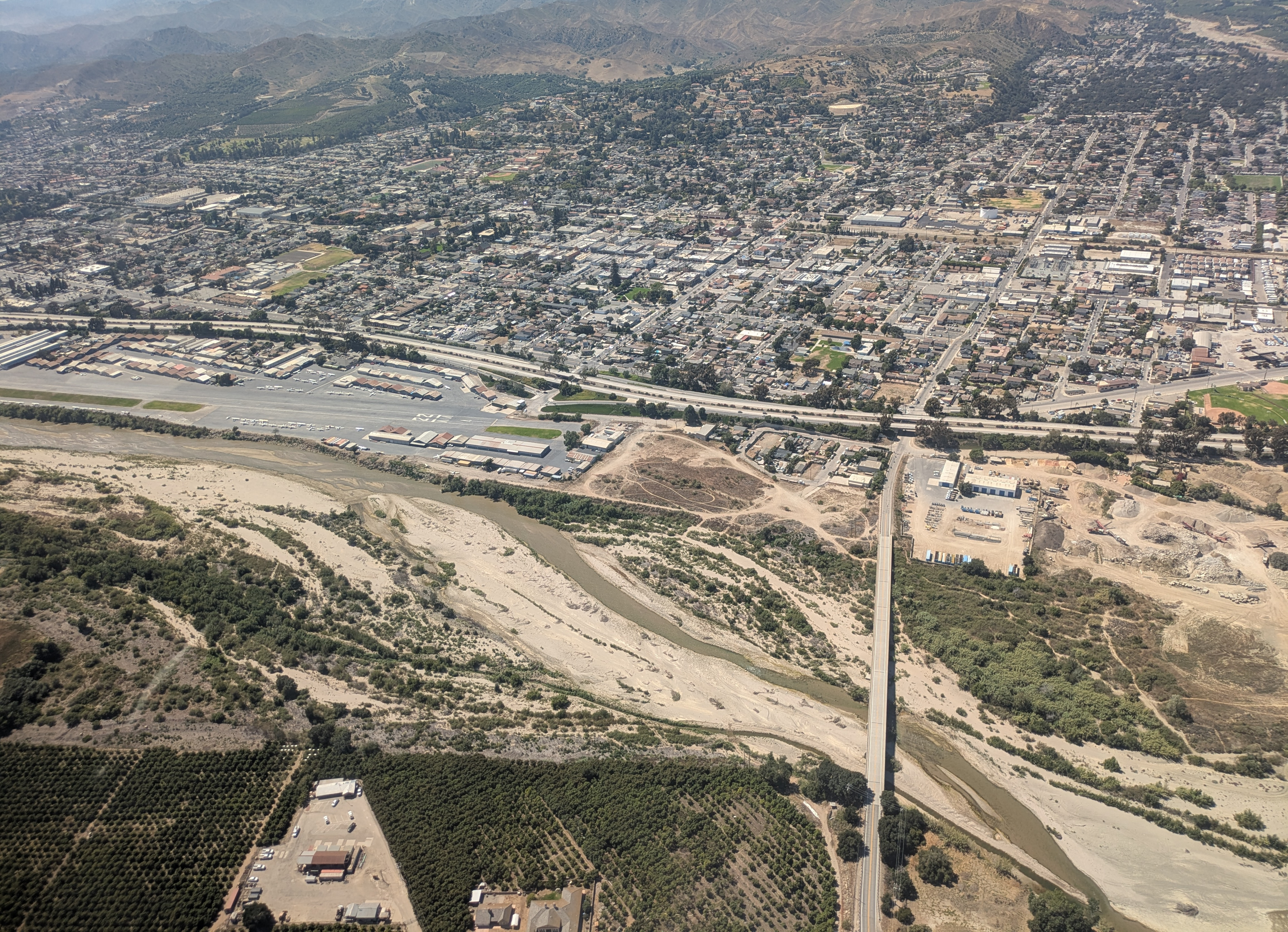
Santa Paula Airport and the city of Santa Paula, view to the north.

Santa Paula Airport covers an area of 51 acres (21 ha) at an elevation of 250 feet (76 m) above mean sea level. It has one runway designated 4/22 with an asphalt surface measuring 2,665×60 feet (812×18 m); it also one helipad designated H1 which is 60×60 feet (18×18 m).

The airport is a non-towered facility handling approximately 97,000 arrivals and/or departures a year, and is home to over 309 individual aircraft.

For the 12-month period ending November 6, 2023, the airport had 97,000 general aviation aircraft operations, an average of 266 per day. At that time there were 309 aircraft based at this airport: 295 single-engine, 6 multi-engine, 4 helicopter, 2 glider, and 2 ultralight.

The airport is used for training flights by pilots around Southern and Central California, due to the unique operating environment, short field and challenging terrain. Much of the original 1930s-era facilities still exist and are used today, giving the airport a very authentic representation of the interwar years. As a result of the airport's history and theme, many vintage aircraft owners have long sought hangar space at the airport's limited facilities for use and display.

=== Tenants ===
CP Aviation offers flight school, aircraft rental, and aircraft maintenance activities. Fuel is also sold at the airport.

The Aviation Museum of Santa Paula is headquartered at the airport.

The airport has a cafe called The Flying Spoon. It opened, replacing the Flight 126 Cafe, in 2025.

=== Events ===
Every first Sunday of the month, the airport is filled visitors. These visitors put their airplanes on display with info cards on the propeller. CP Aviation sells Santa Paula souvenirs. Also, car clubs come in displaying unique and exotic cars. The Petersen Auto Museum has displayed its Ferrari collection there.

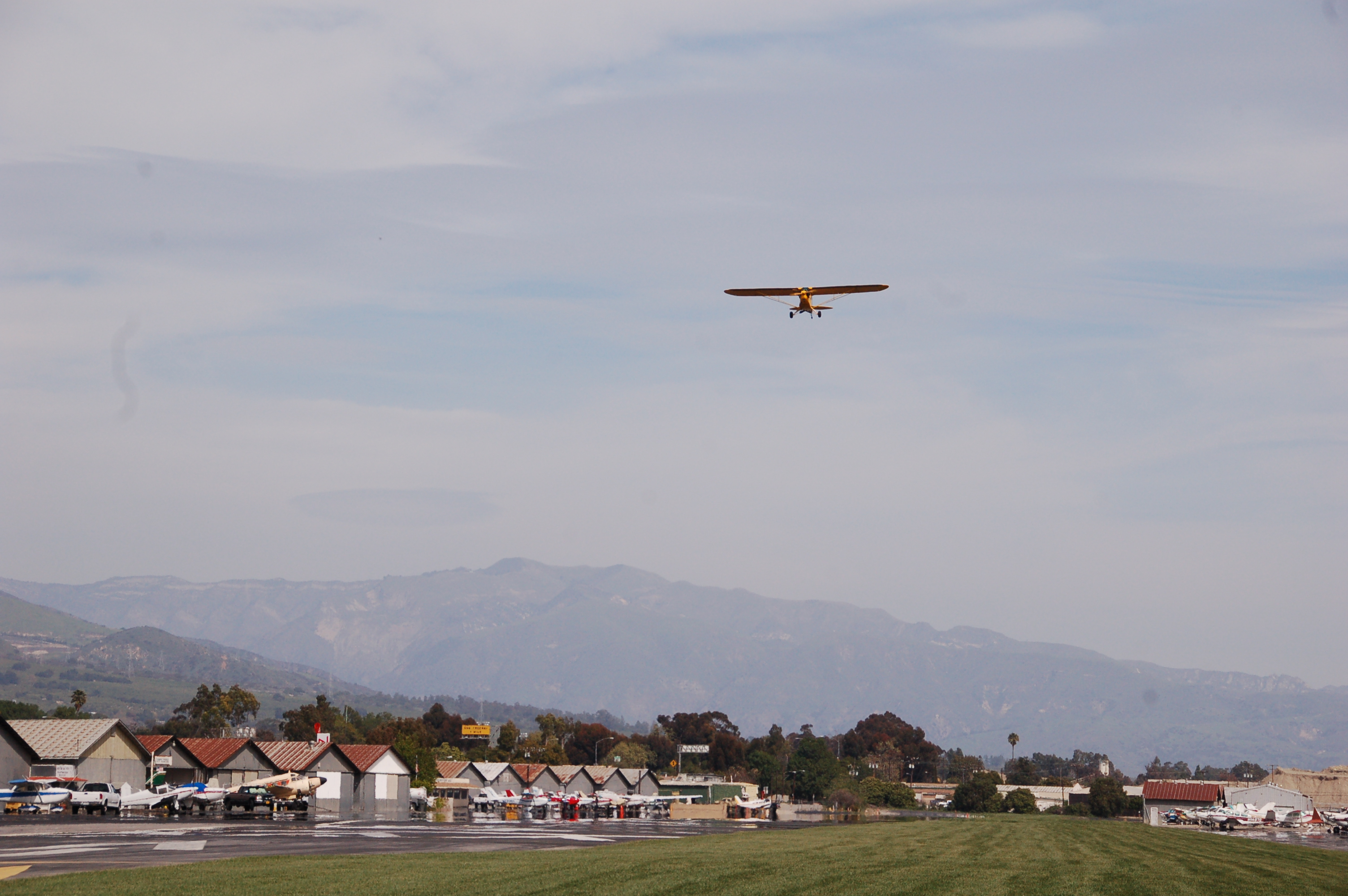
The airport as seen from Runway 4

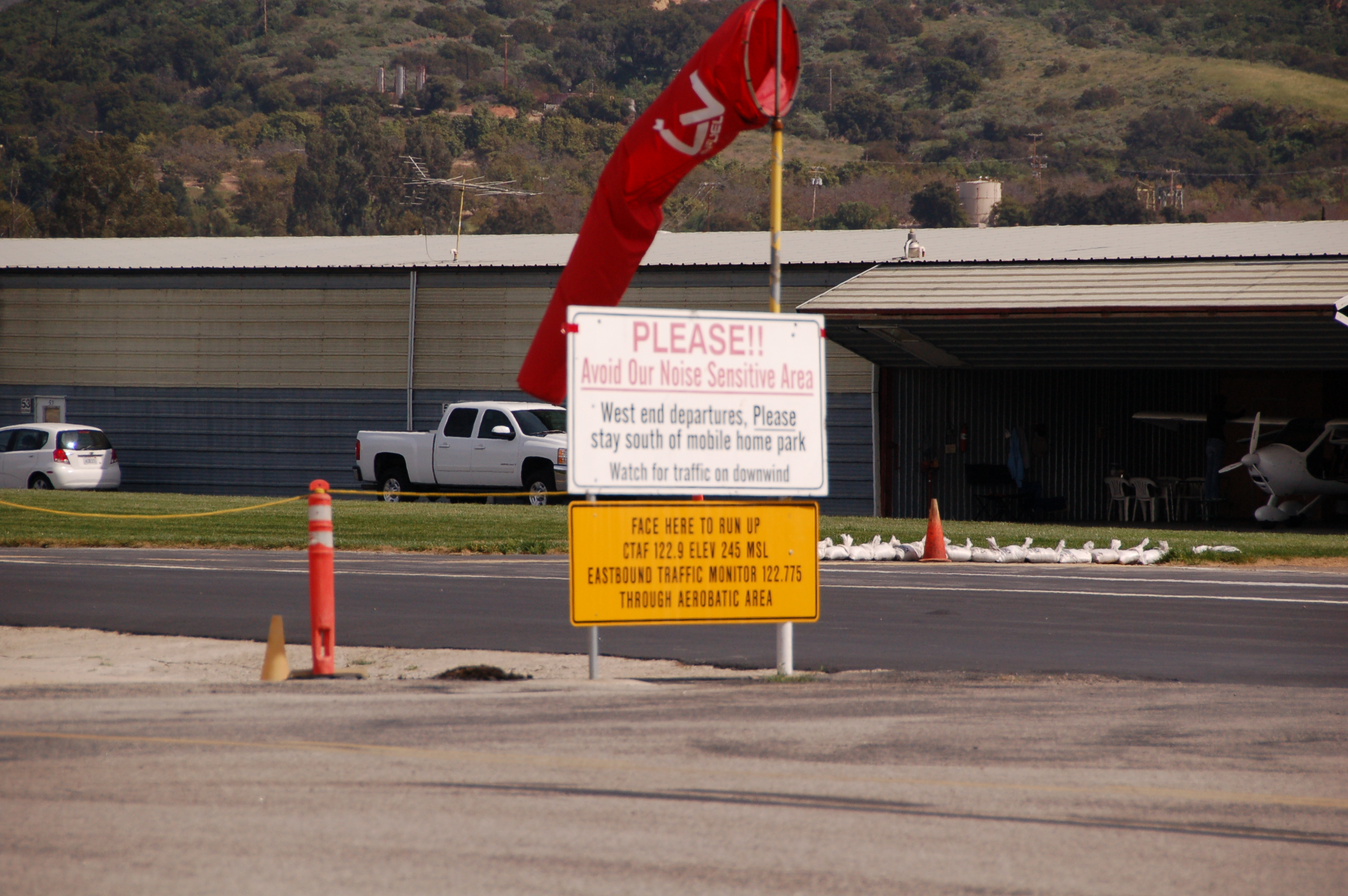
Wind sock and notices to airmen as seen by the end of Runway 22

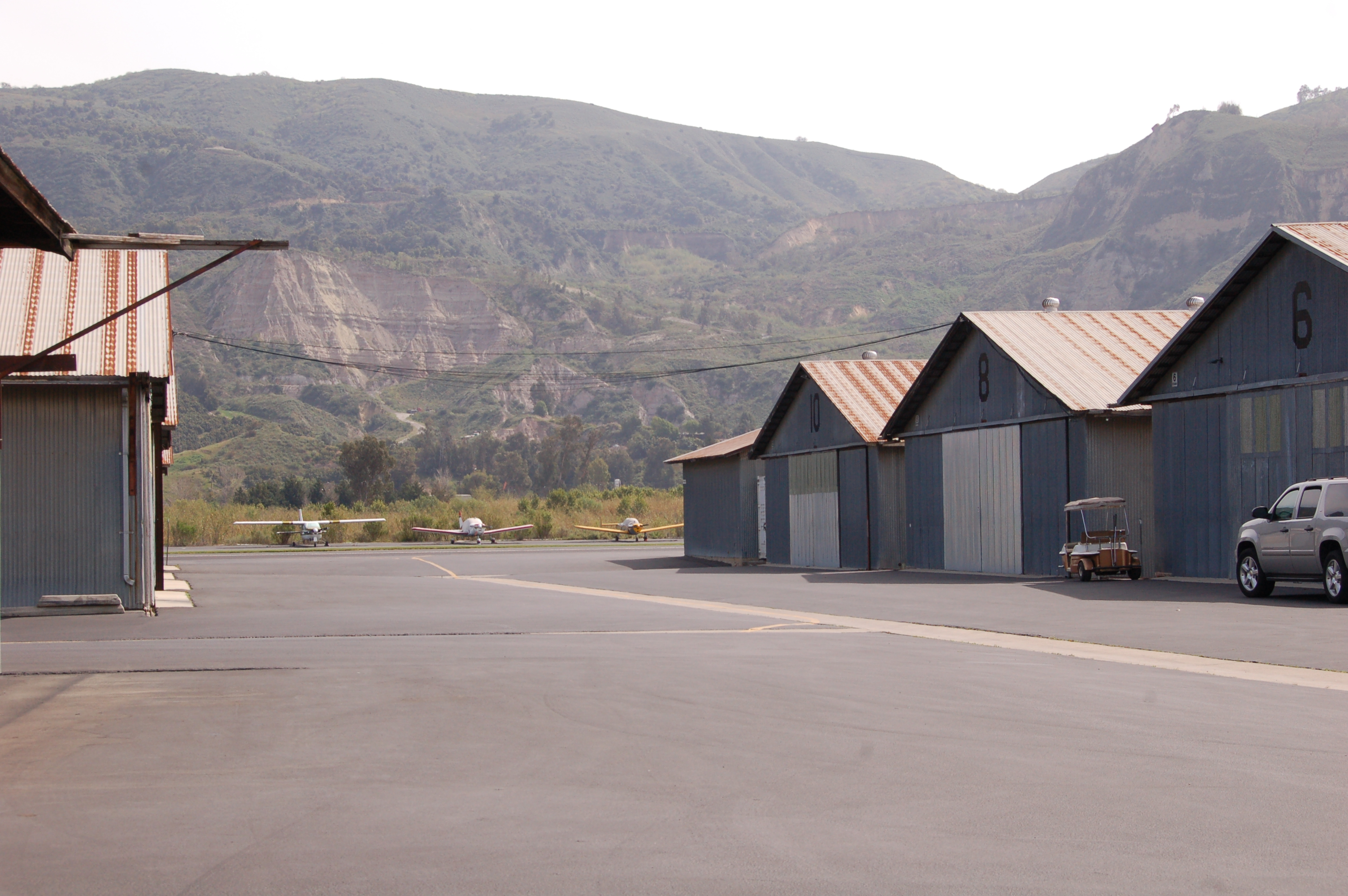
A view from the hangars on the Northwest side of the airport

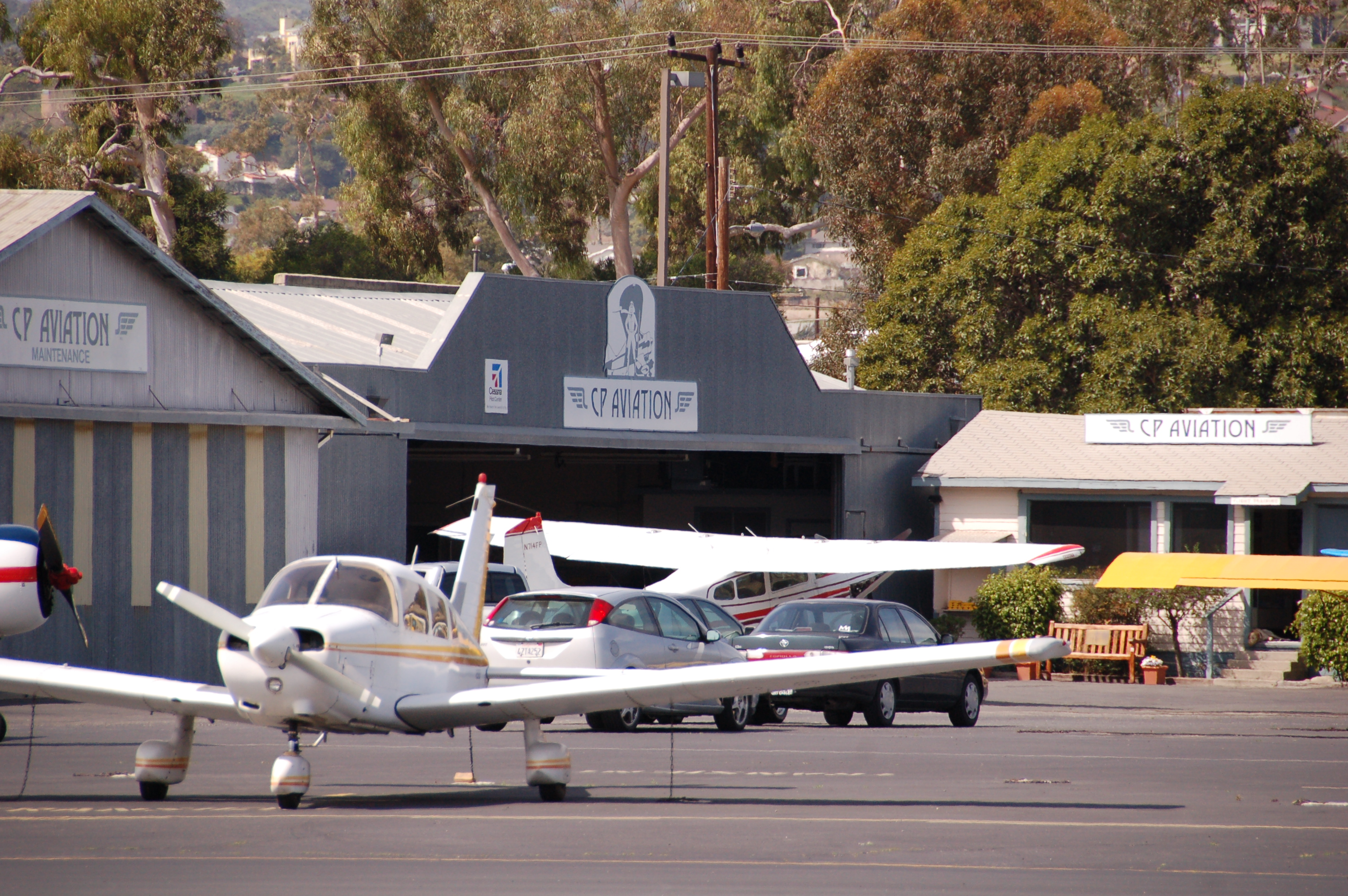
CP Aviation, seen from the South end of the airport

== Accidents and incidents ==
Between 1984 and 1995 there were 24 crashes, and 11 related fatalities at Santa Paula.

On February 13, 1991, there was a collision between a Bell Jet Ranger helicopter and a Pitts Aerobatic aircraft above the airport. The two people on the plane died. Three on the helicopter were injured, including actor Kirk Douglas and voice actor Noel Blanc.

On April 3, 1991, two men died when the engine failed in their home-built plane. The plane fell and caught fire after hitting a golf cart.

On August 27, 1992, a man died when his Cessna collided in midair with another Cessna, then went through two houses near the runway.

On December 31, 1993, a man drowned when his two-seat Grumman lost power and went into the Santa Clara River.

On June 21, 1994, a man died when his homemade ultra-light plane stalled and crashed into the Santa Clara.

On July 3, 1994, a man and his daughter died when their Cessna 195 had engine trouble and crashed.

On August 12, 1995, a stunt pilot, former U. S. Navy fighter and test pilot, was killed during the 65th annual Santa Paula Air Show. His Berkut stunt plane crashed while performing a maneuver.
