= Buck Rogers (disambiguation) =

Buck Rogers is a science fiction character.

Buck Rogers may also refer to:

- Buck Rogers in the 25th Century (radio series), a 1932–47 radio series based on the character
- Buck Rogers (serial), a 1939 film serial based on the character
- Buck Rogers, a 1950–51 TV series based on the character
- Buck Rogers in the 25th Century (TV series), a 1979–81 television series based on the character
  - Buck Rogers in the 25th Century (film), a 1979 theatrical film that was the pilot for the television series
- Buck Rogers XXVC, a pen-and-paper roleplaying game system based on the above character
- Buck Rogers: A Life in the Future, a 1995 novel by Martin Caidin based upon the character
- Buck Rogers – Battle for the 25th Century, a board game based upon the character
- Buck Rogers (song), by the rock group Feeder
- Buck Rogers: Planet of Zoom, a 1982 rail shooter video game based upon the character

== See also ==
- Buck Rogers in the 25th Century (disambiguation)
- Buck Rogers (baseball) (1912–99), Major League Baseball pitcher
- William "Buck" Rogers (born 1928), Canadian football player
- Buck Rodgers (born 1938), baseball player/coach/manager
- Brendan Rodgers (born 1973), nicknamed "Buck Rodgers", football player/coach/manager
- Chris Rogers (cricketer) (born 1973), nicknamed "Buck Rodgers", Australian cricket player
