= Buck Rogers in the 25th Century =

Buck Rogers in the 25th Century may refer to various science fiction works featuring the character Buck Rogers, including:

- Buck Rogers in the 25th Century (radio series) (1932–1947)
- Buck Rogers in the 25th Century (film) (1979)
- Buck Rogers in the 25th Century (TV series) (1979–1981)
- Buck Rogers in the 25th Century (comic strip) (originally Buck Rogers in the 25th Century A.D.), a 1979–1983 revival of the original Buck Rogers comic strip

== See also ==
- Buck Rogers (disambiguation)
- Duck Dodgers in the 24½th Century
