= Killer Kane =

- Buck Rogers character
- First appearance: January 30, 1929
- Created by: Philip Francis Nowlan
- Portrayed by: Anthony Warde (1939 serial); Henry Silva (1979 film); Michael Ansara (1979 series)

In-universe information
- Alias: The Leader Kane; The Leader
- Gender: Male
- Title: The Leader of the Planet Earth and, briefly, Dictator of the Planet Saturn

Killer Kane is a fictional character in the Buck Rogers comic strip and its subsequent 1939 Buck Rogers serial film produced by Universal Studios. The character also appeared in the 1979 film and subsequent TV series, in which he defected from Earth to the Draco Nebula; there Kane assisted that galaxy's malevolent rulers -- Emperor Draconius XII ("Draco" for short) and his daughter, Princess Ardala, both of House Valmar -- with their plans to conquer Earth.

== Comic strip ==
In the comic strip, Kane was a dark-haired, mustachioed soldier. Kane first appeared in the January 30, 1929 comic strip. He was romantically involved with Wilma Deering; however, after Wilma left him for Buck Rogers, Kane became a criminal and Buck's mortal enemy. Kane carried out numerous criminal schemes and attempted to kill Buck on numerous occasions. Kane was often assisted by his girlfriend, Ardala Valmar.

== Movie serial ==
Kane is a "super-racketeer" who became the supreme dictator of Earth with the help of his criminal army. Although the events of the serial transpire in the year 2440, Kane has apparently ruled the world for some time before that. He was portrayed by actor Anthony Warde.

Although Kane is the main villain in the serial, he comes face-to-face with his rival Buck Rogers only a few times. He rarely leaves his council chambers, preferring to let his underling Captain Laska carry out his commands. Although he is the unquestioned ruler of the planet, Kane's actions show that deep down, he is still a mere thug; he screams insults at his lieutenants and bullies other subordinates. He even pushes and shoves his councilors out of his chambers at one point.

In the 20th century, the forces of crime and disorder around the world steadily gained power. Because of the inability of society to control the criminal element, gangsters and racketeers gradually dominated the governments of the world. Some time before the year 2440, a "super-racketeer" known as Kane achieved complete global domination. His cruel, ruthless rule earned him the nickname "Killer Kane".

Supported by a council of lesser gangsters, and backed by an army of raygun-toting crooks, Kane managed to suppress all resistance, save for a valiant few who made their new home in the so-called "Hidden City". Led by the wise Dr. Huer and his military counterpart, Air Marshal Kragg, these rebels hoped to gain the assistance of the forces of Saturn. However, knowing that the support of the Saturnians could help the Hidden City overthrow him, Kane posted patrols in the atmosphere to prevent any ship from leaving the planet.

The revival of 20th-century pilot Buck Rogers proved to be the beginning of the end for Kane. In short order, Buck evaded Kane's space patrols; outmaneuvered his chief lieutenant, Captain Laska; thwarted the attempted kidnapping of Prince Tallen, ambassador of Saturn; released political dissidents from Kane's Robot Battalion; and finally overthrew and captured Kane and his entire criminal government.

The serial also shows Kane residing in a luxury penthouse suite. Although the people over whom he rules refer to him as "Killer Kane", he prefers to be addressed (and identifies himself) as "The Leader" and presents himself to the Saturnians as a benevolent monarch. Although he seems obsessed with finding and destroying the Hidden City, he apparently never considers the possibility that they will mount a serious offensive against him.

As a leader, Kane tolerates no dissent. Through the use of his brainwashing Amnesia Helmets, Kane reduces his human opponents to mere automatons who labor mindlessly in his prison camps. When dealing with his minions, Kane is easily driven to impatience; while listening to a report, he only allows his henchman to state his name and location before exclaiming, "Never mind all that!" When Kane actually has the upper hand over Buck Rogers, gaining complete control over him with an Amnesia Helmet, Kane does not finish off his enemy. Instead, he has Buck kneel down and polish his boots while the dictator gloats over him.

Some reviewers believe that when measured against other serial villains such as Ming the Merciless, Killer Kane pales somewhat in comparison and the script of the 1939 serial gives him little to do other than shout at his henchmen and strut about his council chambers.iː

== 1979 movie and TV series ==
On the 1979 television series Buck Rogers in the 25th Century, Kane is reimagined as a defector from Earth to the Draconian Realm, a powerful empire said to have conquered three quarters of the known universe. Known simply as "Kane" in this version, he is the supreme commander of the Draconian forces under Emperor Draco. While the original Killer Kane was the absolute leader, on the television series, Kane answers to Draco and (grudgingly) his daughter Princess Ardala, who acts as Draco's emissary (although Princess Ardala did not appear in the 1939 serial). In this version, Ardala is a Princess (which she was not in the original comic strips) who also commands Kane (in the comics, it was Ardala who was Kane's subordinate).

In the 1979 pilot film, the role was played by Henry Silva while on the follow-up series, he was played by Michael Ansara. The two portrayals are somewhat different. Silva's Kane was much cooler and more calculating who often took a firm hand with Ardala whom he had designs on, romantically and/or politically. Ansara's Kane was slightly older (Ansara was four years older than Silva), and was more subservient to Ardala, acting more as her henchman rather than her collaborator with no obvious designs on her. He was also a more honorable man than Silva's Kane and could keep Ardala in line by letting her face the consequences of her own mistakes (such as when he was ready to allow Tigerman to kill Ardala in response to her ordering him to kill Buck who had saved Tigerman's life). While already having a grudging respect for Buck as a worthy enemy, his respect grew even more after joining forces to fight together against the Zadd Empire.

== Personality ==
Kane is usually depicted as vain, pompous and overconfident. He dresses flamboyantly, usually in black or purple, and maintains a finely trimmed mustache. In most versions of the Buck Rogers story, his villainy is motivated by jealousy of Buck Rogers and a desire for wealth or political power.
