= Stormin' Home =

- Genre: Drama
- Written by: James Booth
- Directed by: Jerry Jameson
- Starring: Gil Gerard; Lisa Blount; Pat Corley
- Music by: Bruce Broughton
- Country of origin: United States
- Original language: English

Production
- Producers: Jerry Jameson; Jill Trump
- Production location: Dallas
- Cinematography: Robert C. Jessup
- Editor: Lee Burch
- Running time: 100 minutes
- Production company: CBS Entertainment Productions

Original release
- Network: CBS
- Release: April 5, 1985

Stormin' Home is a 1985 American made-for-television drama film directed by Jerry Jameson and starring Gil Gerard.

== Plot ==
A truck driver dreams of returning to motorcycle racing.

== Cast ==
- Gil Gerard as Bobby Atkins
- Lisa Blount as Sissy Rigetti
- Pat Corley as Broker
- Emily Moultrie as Annie
- Joanna Kerns as Lana Singer
- John Pleshette as Al Singer
- Geoffrey Lewis as Scooter Lee

== Production ==
The movie was filmed in Texas.
