= Finding Grace =

- Directed by: Warren Fast
- Written by: Warren Fast
- Produced by: Stacie Fast; London Grace
- Starring: Paris Warner; Jasen Wade; Kisha Ogelsby; Erin Gray; David Keith
- Release date: December 5, 2019 (Salt Lake City)
- Running time: 106 minutes
- Country: United States
- Language: English

Finding Grace is a 2019 American drama film written and directed by Warren Fast and starring Paris Warner, Jasen Wade, Kisha Ogelsby, Erin Gray and David Keith. It is Fast's feature directorial debut.

== Plot ==
A struggling family, already on the verge of disintegration, faces new challenges that will test faith in God and each other.

== Cast ==
- Paris Warner as Alaska Rose
- Jasen Wade as Conner Rose
- Kisha Sharon Oglesby as Julianna Foster
- Erin Gray as Judge Ariel Harper
- David Keith as Bishop Reed
- Bo Svenson as Dr. Nelson
- Bethany Davenport as Amanda Wheeler
- Lacy Hartselle as Amy James
- Braden Balazik as Kyle Rose
- Gage Maynard as Ron
- Warren Fast as Bryan Shaw
- Stacie Fast as Annette Shaw
- Phyllis Spielman as Principal Grey
- David Raizor as Alfredo
- Michael Gladden as Officer Brennan
- Steve Norris as Ben
- DeeJay Sturdivant as Thad
- Israel Varela as Jimmy
- Barbara Chevalier as Lindsey
- Trent Van Alstine as Derek Austin
- Paige Fiser as Kelly Shaw
- Lacie Fiser as Jade Shaw

== Production ==
Filming occurred from April 26 to May 15 of 2018 in Bay County, Florida.

== Release ==
The film premiered at Jordan Commons in Salt Lake City, Utah on December 5, 2019. It was also released at the Gretchen Nelson Scott Fine Arts Center at Mosley High School in Lynn Haven, Florida on December 11, 2019. The film was also shown at the SCERA Center For the Arts in Orem, Utah as part of the LDS Film Festival.

== Reception ==
Trina Boice of LDS Living graded the film an A−.
