= Wilma Deering =

Fictional character from Buck Rogers franchise

Publication information
- Publisher: Amazing Stories
- First appearance: August 1928
- Created by: Philip Francis Nowlan

In-story information
- Supporting character of: Buck Rogers

Wilma Deering is a fictional character featured in the various iterations of Buck Rogers which have spanned many media over the years.

Through all the versions of Buck Rogers, Wilma Deering has maintained some clear characteristics. She is a sometimes-romantic interest for Buck, always a loyal defender of Earth, and an attractive and smart woman. She is generally depicted as brave with a penchant for getting herself into trouble. As with other science fiction heroines from the pulp science fiction genre and others, she has sometimes been depicted as a damsel in distress but more often as an assertive adventurer. In this way, her character resembles that of Dale Arden of the Flash Gordon comic books and movie serials, and also the character Lois Lane from Superman.

== Pulp origins ==
Wilma Deering appears in the very first Buck Rogers story, the novella Armageddon 2419 A.D. (1928), and the basic elements are present. She is depicted as adventurous, heroic and beautiful, and a romantic interest for the hero.

== Comic strip ==
Wilma features in the Buck Rogers comic strip from its inception, as she is the first person of Earth to meet Buck when he awakens in the 25th century. Depicted from the start as a love interest, Wilma is initially almost a stock character heroine just as Dr. Elias Huer is a stock "brainy scientist". However, her character does develop over time into the more familiar spunky adventurer.

== 1939 serial ==
The character Wilma Deering was featured in the 1939 Buck Rogers movie serial which starred Buster Crabbe. The role of Wilma was portrayed by Constance Moore, in what would come to be her first highly recognized film role. In the serial, Buck Rogers and Buddy Wade awaken in the 25th century to find out that the world has been taken over by the outlaw army of Killer Kane. Along with Wilma Deering, who is a lieutenant in this incarnation, Buck and Buddy join in the fight to overthrow Kane with the help of Prince Tallen of Saturn and his forces. In this serial, Wilma is essentially the faithful sidekick, and her relationship with Dr. Huer is akin to that of a daughter.

== 1950 series ==
Lou Prentis played Wilma Deering in the 1950 ABC series.

== 1979 movie and series ==
Colonel Wilma Deering was portrayed by actress/model Erin Gray in the 1979 movie and subsequent NBC television series Buck Rogers in the 25th Century. Initially, Wilma was depicted as a cold, aloof military officer and starfighter pilot, with little interest in Captain Rogers. However, she quickly warmed to him and, throughout the weekly series, Wilma Deering's character became warmer, sexier and more humorous. Often, it was Wilma who came to the rescue of Buck, as opposed to the other way round. Erin Gray has commented that her role as Colonel Deering was an inspiration for many women who watched the program, particularly with regard to careers in the military. She also commented that she was aware of the highly sexualised one-piece uniform she wore and its effect on the show's male audience. She was once described by Clive James as Wonder Woman with brains.

Revisions to the program in its second season changed Wilma from the central role of a colonel directing Earth's space defense, to more of a co-pilot role on the spaceship Searcher. This change was never entirely explained, but along with Buck and Twiki, hers was the only character viewed central enough to migrate to the revamped series.

After the release of the film in 1979, Erin Gray initially opted not to reprise the role for the weekly television series and actress Juanin Clay was cast in the role. However, Gray then decided she would continue with the role. Clay appeared in an episode of the series as Major Marla Landers, a Wilma Deering-type character, in the episode "Vegas in Space" (1979).

== Buck Rogers XXV roleplaying game ==
The character Wilma Deering in the Buck Rogers roleplaying game is a more dystopic figure, in keeping with the themes of the game.

In the role playing game, Wilma is a native of the Chicagorg Arcology on Earth, and is described as an 8th level Terran warrior and a freedom fighter. Both her parents were killed by RAM, the evil organization that runs the corrupt Earth government in the game. Her biography indicates she was imprisoned for attacking RAM installations, and escaped later becoming a privateer. After several months, Wilma returned to Earth to officially join NEO, the rebel organization, and resumed her effort to free her home world from RAM.

This version of Wilma is a tall woman with strawberry blonde hair and an explosive temper, and once again is both a foil and love interest for Buck Rogers.

== Buck Rogers: A Life in the Future ==
Another incarnation of Wilma Deering appears in the novel Buck Rogers: A Life in the Future (1995) by Martin Caidin. This version of Deering is said to be a top pilot in the Space Corps, and continues the tradition of falling in love with the time-displaced test pilot, Buck Rogers.
