= Erin Gray =

American actress (born 1950)

- Gray at Dragon Con in 2026
- Born: January 7, 1950 (age 76); Honolulu, Territory of Hawaii, U.S.
- Occupation: Actress
- Years active: 1967–present
- Known for: Colonel Wilma Deering – Buck Rogers in the 25th Century; Kate Summers-Stratton – Silver Spoons
- Spouses: Ken Schwartz (m. 1968; div. 1990) Richard Hissong (m. 1991)
- Children: Two

Erin S. Gray (born January 7, 1950) is an American actress who began her career as a model. She has also worked as a casting agent. Her roles include Colonel Wilma Deering in the science fiction television series Buck Rogers in the 25th Century and Kate Summers-Stratton in the situation comedy Silver Spoons.

== Early life ==
When Gray was eight, her parents separated.

Gray attended Redwood High School and finished her last semester at Pacific Palisades High School. She briefly attended college at UCLA, majoring in mathematics.

== Career ==
Gray started her career in modeling. She entered her first contest and won a modeling assignment in St. Louis when she was 14 years old. Commercials followed in Los Angeles. She also appeared on television in 1967 as a dancer in Malibu U. However, she decided to move to New York City to further her modeling career. "By 1975, Gray was one of the nation's top TV models, earning $100,000 a year." Having developed an interest in acting, she auditioned for parts during her frequent trips to Los Angeles.

In 1978, she landed her first starring role, on the miniseries Evening in Byzantium. Following good notices, Gray was put on a seven-year contract at Universal Studios, which led directly to her taking the role of Colonel Wilma Deering in Buck Rogers in the 25th Century, at first for a theatrically released movie, then for a weekly TV series. Gray, wearing a Spandex jumpsuit, was popular with the show's predominantly young male audience.

Gray was aware of the sexiness of her tight uniform. Her character, the female lead, also had a high profile in the show, second only to Gil Gerard in the starring role. Gray was seen as an important role model for female viewers, as she explained to an interviewer:

I was the first female colonel. I enjoyed being that kind of role model for young women watching the show. A woman can be a colonel! A woman can be in charge! Those were new ideas then.

Shortly after Buck Rogers, Gray appeared in the first season Magnum, P.I. episode, "J. 'Digger' Doyle", in which she played security expert Joy 'Digger' Doyle. The role was intended to become recurring, and even possibly spun off into a separate series, but neither happened, and it remained the character's only appearance in the series. In 1982, Gray played the role of Lilah in the summer feature film Six Pack as Kenny Rogers' love interest. Gray's role as Kate Summers in the TV sitcom Silver Spoons lasted for several years in the 1980s. When that show ended, she took regular film and TV work; she appeared in an episode of Superboy and Murder, She Wrote. In 1993, Gray had a featured role in Jason Goes to Hell: The Final Friday, the ninth entry in the Friday the 13th series. She also appeared in the 2005 film Siren.

Gray in 2009

In 2010, Gray and Gil Gerard returned to Buck Rogers by playing the characters' parents in the pilot episode of the Buck Rogers web series. Among her work in commercials was a 2010 spot for Pup-Peroni dog treats.

Gray is now a casting agent whose agency, Heroes for Hire, specializes in booking sci-fi and fantasy stars for personal appearances, speaking engagements, and charity events. Gray also teaches tai chi.

In 1998, Gray wrote a book, Act Right, with Mara Purl which contains advice for novice television and movie actors. A revised edition was published in 2002.

Gray starred in the 2011 film Dreams Awake (with Alien Nation co-star Gary Graham). She also played the role of Madeline Twain on the web series The Guild.

Gray guest-starred in the 2014 webisode "Lolani" from the web series Star Trek Continues as Commodore Gray, an episode that also starred Lou Ferrigno. Commodore Gray reappears in 2016, with the seventh episode "Embracing the Winds."

== Personal life ==
Gray has been married twice. She met Ken Schwartz in high school and married in San Francisco on November 29, 1968, which lasted until 1990, during which they had one son in 1976. Schwartz, a real estate executive, remained in New York with their young son when Gray first started working on Buck Rogers, and eventually moved to Los Angeles to work as her manager when her acting career flourished.

Gray married Richard Hissong in 1991, and their daughter, Samantha, was born the same year. Samantha plays Buck Rogers' girlfriend, Maddy, in the pilot episode of James Cawley's Buck Rogers Internet video series.

Gray is also active in the fight against child exploitation.

== Filmography ==
=== Film ===
Year	Title	Role	Notes
1979	Buck Rogers in the 25th Century	Colonel Wilma Deering	
1979	Winter Kills	Beautiful Woman Three	
1982	Six Pack	Lilah	
1989	The Princess and the Dwarf	Unknown	
1993	Jason Goes to Hell: The Final Friday	Diana Kimble	
1994	A Dangerous Place	Audrey	
1994	T-Force	Mayor Pendleton	
2000	The Last Producer	Dee Freeman	
2000	Woman's Story	Laurel Warner	
2000	Delicate Instruments	Jessica Livingston	Short
2001	Serial Intentions	Virginia Madden	
2001	Touched by a Killer	Liza Collins	
2001	Social Misfits	Sharon Cox, Mitsy's Mom	
2002	Clover Bend	Betty Clayton	
2002	Special Weapons and Tactics	The Mayor	Short
2003	Manfast	Gloria Day	
2005	Caught in the Headlights	Mrs. Jones	
2006	Siren	Sharon Cox	
2007	Jane Doe: How to Fire Your Boss	Laura Sands	
2008	Nuclear Hurricane	Jane	
2008	The Wedding Video	Carol	
2008	Loaded	Susan Price	
2008	My True Self	Mrs. Ellen Fields	
2009	Hunter Prey	Clea	
2011	Dreams Awake	Hope Emrys	
2012	Nesting	Mrs. Deegan	
2013	Crystal Lake Memories: The Complete History of Friday the 13th	Herself	Documentary film
2014	Christmas in Palm Springs	Mayor Tomlin	
2017	In-World War	Mother	
2019	Finding Grace	Judge Ariel Harper	
2019	A Christmas Princess	Queen Alice of Edgemont	

=== Television ===
Year	Title	Role	Notes
1976	Maude	Model (uncredited)	1 episode: "The Game Show"
1978	Police Story	Laurie Tice	1 episode: "Day of Terror... Night of Fear"
1978	Evening in Byzantium	Gail McKinnon	TV movie
1979	The Rockford Files	Margaret 'Alta' Hatch	1 episode: "With the French Heel Back, Can the Nehru Jacket Be Far Behind?"
1979	The Ultimate Impostor	Beatrice 'Bucky' Tate	TV movie
1979	B. J. and the Bear	Samantha Evans	1 episode: "Cain's Cruiser"
1979–1981	Buck Rogers in the 25th Century	Colonel Wilma Deering	Female lead, entire run (32 episodes)
1980	Vegas	Jennifer Stallings	1 episode: "Black Cat Killer"
1980	Coach of the Year	Paula DeFalco	TV movie
1980-1982	Fantasy Island	Laura Jensen / Carla Marco	2 episodes: "Face of Love/Image of Celeste", "Skater's Edge/Concerto of Death/The Last Great Race"
1980	The Love Boat	Maggie Cook, Agent to Mr. Swaggart	Season 4 Episode 9: "Maggie Cook"
1981	Magnum, P.I.	Joy 'Digger' Doyle	1 episode: "J."Digger" Doyle"
1982	The Fall Guy	Bonnie Carlson	2 episodes: "License to Kill: Parts 1 & 2"
1982	Simon & Simon	Vicki Whittaker	1 episode: "Matchmaker"
1982	Born Beautiful	Betsy Forrest	TV movie
1982–1987	Silver Spoons	Kate Summers-Stratton	5 seasons; 116 episodes
1985	Code of Vengeance	Nadine Flowers	1 episode: "Code of Vengeance"
1986	Hotel	Vanessa Clark	1 episode: "Façades"
1987	Starman	Jenny Hayden	2 episodes: "Starscape: Parts 1 & 2"
1987	Breaking Home Ties	Carol	TV movie
1988	Perry Mason: The Case of the Avenging Ace	Captain Terry O'Malley	TV movie
1988	Addicted to His Love	Jenny Barrett	TV movie
1988	Murder, She Wrote	Andrea Dean	1 episode: "Wearing of the Green"
1989	The Hitchhiker	Leslie	1 episode: "Together Forever"
1989	Hunter	Kate Lawson	1 episode: "On Air"
1990	L.A. Law	Rochelle Peters	1 episode: "Ex-Wives and Videotape"
1990	Laker Girls	Julie Lawrence	TV movie
1990	Jake and the Fatman	Jill Crockett	1 episode: "I Know That You Know"
1991	Evening Shade	Madeline Hall	1 episode: "Wood and Ava and Gil and Madeline"
1991	The New Lassie	Maggie Sullivan	1 episode: "Leeds, the Judge"
1992	Superboy	Samantha Meyers	1 episode: "Cat and Mouse"
1992	Dark Justice	Chelsea Manning	1 episode: "The Specialist"
1992	Les Danseurs du Mozambique	Kathryn Saint	TV movie
1993	Almost Home	Jennifer	1 episode: "Sleeping with the Enemy"
1993	Bonkers	Shirley	1 episode: "Quibbling Rivalry"
1993	Official Denial	Annie Corliss	TV movie
1993–1996	Silk Stalkings	Connie Bayliss / Jillian Borson	2 episodes: "Dead Weight", "Exit Dying"
1994	Honor Thy Father and Mother: The True Story of the Menendez Murders	Pamela Bozanich	TV movie
1994	Burke's Law	Brenda Palmer	1 episode: "Who Killed the Anchorman?"
1994	Heaven Help Us	Unknown	1 episode: "The Belle's Farewell"
1995	Crowfoot	Nora	TV movie
1995	Renegade	Donna MacKenzie	1 episode: "Dead Heat"
1997–1998	Baywatch	Chief Monica Johnson	5 episodes
1999–2000	Port Charles	Nicole Devlin	
2000	Profiler	Congresswoman Karen Archer	3 episodes: "Paradise Lost", "The Long Way Home", "Mea Culpa"
2002	Weakest Link	Herself	Played for Haven House & National Coalition Against Domestic Violence.
2007	The Wedding Bells	Candy Heller	1 episode: "Wedding from Hell"
2007	Nuclear Hurricane	Jane	TV movie
2008	Ghouls	Liz	TV movie
2010	Elf Sparkle and the Special Red Dress	Josette Peacock	TV movie
2011	The Guild	Madeleine Twain	5 episodes
2012	I Married Who?	Ethel Swift	TV movie
2013	TableTop	Herself	1 episode: "Unspeakable Words"
2014	Star Trek Continues	Commodore Gray	2 episodes: "Lolani", "Embracing the Winds"
2016	A Perfect Christmas	Patricia	TV movie
2017	Mystery Science Theater 3000	Martha Masters	1 episode: "Reptilicus"
2018	The Thundermans	"Nana" Thunderman	Episode: Make it Pop Pop

=== Video games ===
Year	Title	Role
2009	Ghostbusters: The Video Game	Spider Witch / Additional Voices
