= Gil Gerard =

American actor (1943–2025)

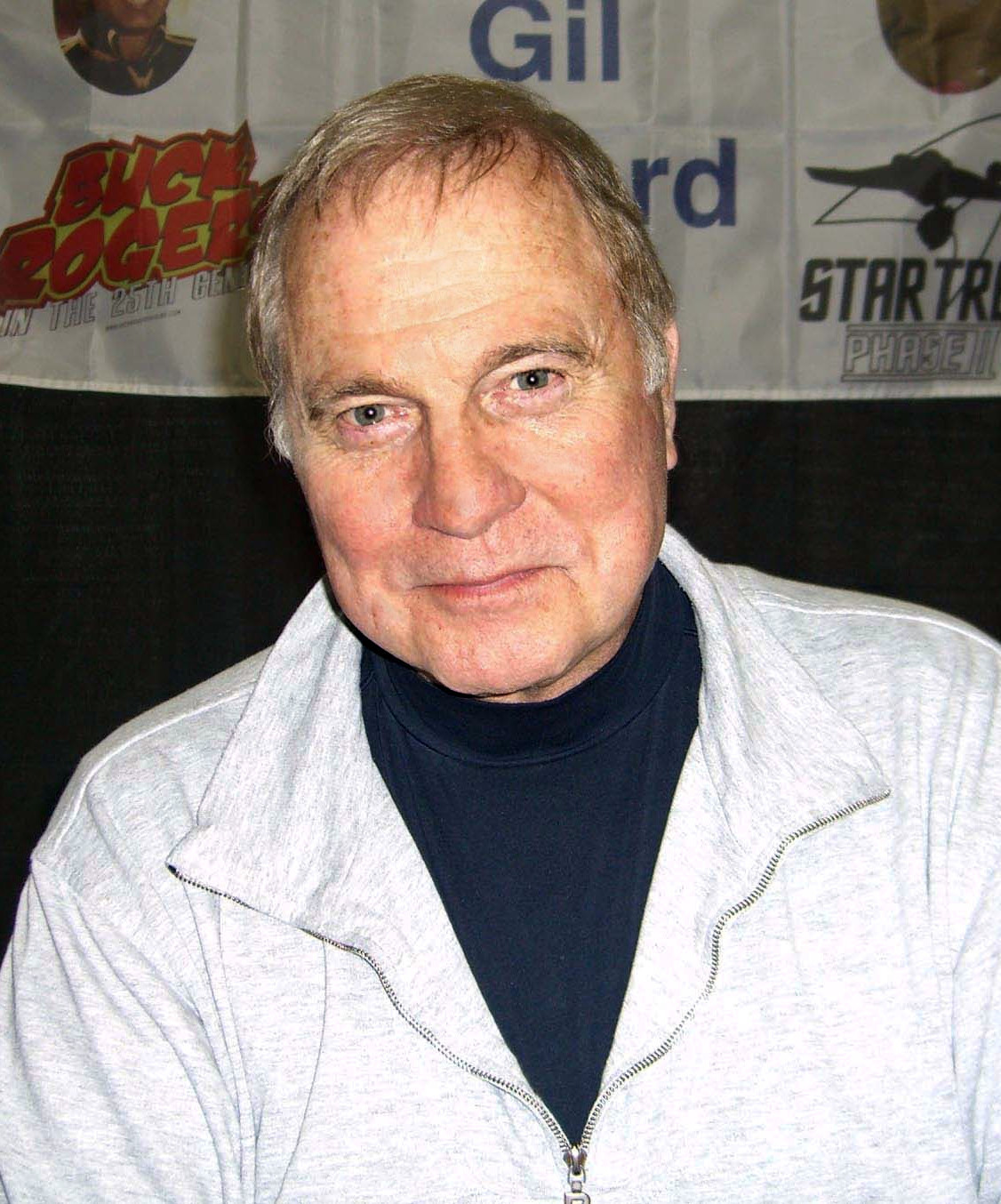
- Gerard in 2009
- Born: Gilbert Cyril Gerard; January 23, 1943; Little Rock, Arkansas, U.S.
- Died: December 16, 2025 (aged 82); Georgia, U.S.
- Education: University of Central Arkansas (dropped out)
- Occupation: Actor
- Years active: 1960–2019
- Known for: Buck Rogers in the 25th Century
- Spouses: Connie Sellecca (m. 1979; div. 1987); Bobi Leonard (m. 1987; div. 1989); Janet Gerard
- Children: 1

Gilbert Cyril Gerard (January 23, 1943 – December 16, 2025) was an American actor, whose roles include that of Captain William "Buck" Rogers in the 1979–1981 television series Buck Rogers in the 25th Century.

== Early life ==
Gerard was born on January 23, 1943, in Little Rock, Arkansas, as the youngest of three sons to a college instructor mother and a salesman father. In 1960, he attended a Maryknoll seminary in Glen Ellyn, Illinois, and played the title role in an all-male production of The Music Man. He graduated from Little Rock Catholic High School for Boys, and later attended the University of Central Arkansas but dropped out before graduation.

== Career ==
Gerard traveled to New York City, where he studied drama by day and drove a taxicab at night. Gerard picked up a fare who showed a lively interest in the problems of unknown, unemployed actors. Before he left the cab, he told Gerard to report in a few days to the set of Love Story, which was being filmed on location in New York. When Gerard arrived on the Love Story set, he was hired as an extra. Later that day, he was singled out for a "bit" part, but he was not included in the finished film.

During the next few years, he did most of his acting in television commercials, almost 400, including a stint as spokesman for the Ford Motor Company. After small roles in the gay-themed film Some of My Best Friends Are... (1971), and the thriller Man on a Swing (1974), Gerard gained a prominent role in the daytime soap opera The Doctors for two years. Gerard formed his own production company in partnership with a writer-producer, co-authored a screenplay called Hooch (1977) and filmed it as a starring vehicle for himself. With Hooch completed, he traveled to California to co-star with Yvette Mimieux in Ransom for Alice! (1977) and to play Lee Grant's youthful lover in Universal's Airport '77 (1977). He appeared in a 1977 episode of Hawaii Five-O ("The Ninth Step") as Marty Cobb, a former cop and recovering alcoholic. A guest appearance in Little House on the Prairie impressed producer-star Michael Landon, who cast him in the leading role in the 1978 TV movie Killing Stone.

Gerard then landed his best-known role, as Captain William "Buck" Rogers in the TV series Buck Rogers in the 25th Century, which ran from 1979 to 1981, with the feature-length pilot episode being released theatrically some months prior to the first broadcast of the series. After this, he was featured in a number of other TV shows and movies, including starring roles in the 1982 TV movie Hear No Evil as Dragon, the short-lived series Sidekicks (1986), and E.A.R.T.H. Force (1990).

In 1992, Gerard hosted the reality TV series Code 3, which followed firefighters from different areas of the U.S. as they responded to emergency calls. The show ran on the Fox TV Network until the following year. For the remainder of the 1990s, Gerard made guest appearances on various TV shows, including Fish Police, Brotherly Love, The Big Easy, Days of Our Lives, and Pacific Blue.

In January 2007, Gerard was the subject of the one-hour documentary Action Hero Makeover, which was written, produced, and directed by his then-longtime companion, Adrienne Crow for the Discovery Health Channel. The film documented his year-long progress after undergoing life-saving mini-gastric bypass surgery in October 2005. According to the program, he had been struggling with his weight for 40 years, losing weight only to gain it back. By the time of the program's production, his weight had risen to over 350 pounds (159 kg), and he had many life-threatening health issues including a severe problem with type 2 diabetes. Within five days of the surgery he had lost 20 lb (9 kg), within three months he had lost 80 lb (36 kg), and within ten months he lost a total of 145 lb (66 kg).

Gerard and his Buck Rogers co-star Erin Gray reunited in 2007 for the TV film Nuclear Hurricane, and also returned to the Buck Rogers universe by playing the characters' parents in the pilot episode of James Cawley's Buck Rogers Begins Internet video series in 2009. He guest-starred as Admiral Jack Sheehan in "Kitumba", the January 1, 2014, episode of the fan web series Star Trek: Phase II. In 2015, Gerard voiced Megatronus in Transformers: Robots in Disguise.

== Personal life and death ==
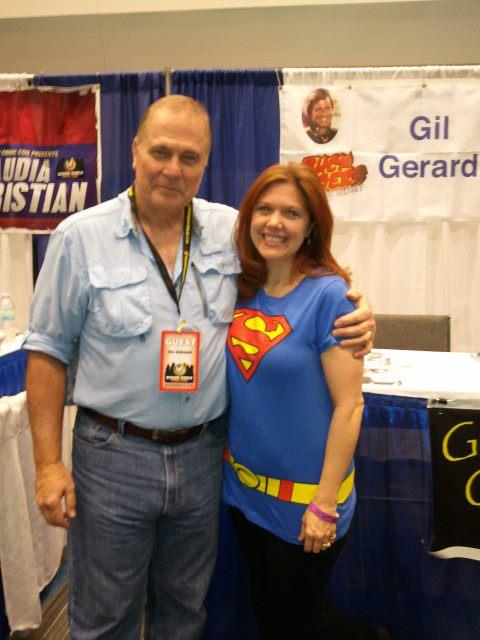
Gerard in 2011

By the end of the 1980s, Gerard had been married five times and divorced four times. His first marriage, in the 1960s to a secretary in his home state of Arkansas, lasted just eight months. After moving to New York to pursue his acting ambitions, his second marriage to a bank executive was equally troubled though it lasted (on and off) for seven years. Following his move to Los Angeles in the late 1970s, he married model/actress Connie Sellecca in 1979. Their son, Gilbert Vincent Gerard, or "Gib", was born in 1981 but the marriage began to disintegrate following the cancellation of Gerard's show Buck Rogers in the 25th Century and his increasing addictions to drugs, alcohol, and overeating. The marriage was formally dissolved in 1987, following a bitter custody battle which gave Sellecca main custody of their son. Gerard married again the same year, to interior designer Bobi Leonard, though the marriage lasted only a year and was then formally dissolved in 1989. His fifth wife was Janet Gerard, to whom he was married for 18 years until his death in 2025. The couple resided in northern Georgia.

Gerard was frank about his battle with addictions. Although he went through recovery for his addiction to cocaine and alcohol, following his divorce from Sellecca in the mid 1980s, his compulsive eating habits increased and he would find himself devouring unhealthy portions of junk food. By 1988, he weighed 300 lb (136 kg) and used a self-help treatment for his addiction, though he estimated that his weight problem had cost him work opportunities in the region of a million dollars. By 1990, he weighed 220 lb (100 kg).

On December 16, 2025, Gerard's wife, Janet, announced on Facebook that he had died earlier that day following a "rare and viciously aggressive form of cancer". He was 82.

== Filmography ==
=== Film ===
Year	Title	Role	Notes
1971	Some of My Best Friends Are...	Scott	
1974	Man on a Swing	Donald Forbes	
1977	Airport '77	Frank Powers	
1977	Hooch	Eddie Joe	
1979	Buck Rogers in the 25th Century	Capt. William "Buck" Rogers	
1985	Fury to Freedom	Officer	
1991	Soldier's Fortune	Robert E. Lee Jones	Alternative title: Soldiers of Fortune
1996	Looking for Bruce	Richard	
1998	Mom, Can I Keep Her?	Reinhart	Direct-to-video
1999	Fugitive Mind	Karl Gardner	Direct-to-video
2000	The Stepdaughter	Jesse Conner	Direct-to-video
2001	Air Rage	Victor Quinn	Direct-to-video
2007	Psycho Hillbilly Cabin Massacre!	Narrator (voice)	Short film
2009	Dire Wolf	Col. Hendry	Alternative title: Dino Wolf
2012	Blood Fare	Professor Meade	
2014	Boldly Gone	Ben (voice)	Short film
2016	The Nice Guys	Bergen Paulsen	
2016	Surge of Power: Revenge of the Sequel	Harold Harris	
2019	Space Captain and Callista	Lance	Final role

=== Television ===
Year	Title	Role	Notes
1973–76	The Doctors	Dr. Alan Stewart	162 episodes
1976	Baretta	Steve	Episode - "Dear Tony"
1977	Ransom for Alice!	Clint Kirby	TV movie
1977	Little House on the Prairie	Chris Nelson	Episode - "The Handyman"
1977	Hawaii Five-O	Marty Cobb	Episode - "The Ninth Step"
1978	Killing Stone	Gil Stone	TV movie
1979–81	Buck Rogers in the 25th Century	Captain William "Buck" Rogers	37 episodes
1982	Help Wanted: Male	Johnny Gillis	TV movie
1982	Not Just Another Affair	Bob Gifford	TV movie
1982	Hear No Evil	Dragon	TV movie
1983	Johnny Blue	Johnny Blue	TV pilot episode
1984	For Love or Money	Mike	TV movie
1984	Monsters, Madmen & Machines	Host	Documentary
1985	Stormin' Home	Bobby Atkins	TV movie
1985	International Airport	David Montgomery	TV movie
1986–87	Sidekicks	Sergeant Jake Rizzo	23 episodes
1989	Nightingales	Dr. Paul Petrillo	5 episodes
1989	Final Notice	Harry Stoner	TV movie
1990	E.A.R.T.H. Force	Dr. John Harding	6 episodes
1992	Fish Police	Additional Voices	Unknown episodes
1996	Brotherly Love	Big Mike	Episode - "Big Mike"
1997	The Big Easy	Mickey Donelley	Episode - "A Perfect Day for Buffalo Fish"
1997	Days of Our Lives	Major Dodd	6 episodes
1998	Pacific Blue	Raymond Annandale	Episode - "Double Lives"
2006	Beyond	General Walter North	TV movie
2007	Nuclear Hurricane	Bob	TV movie
2008	Bone Eater	Big Jim Burns	TV movie
2009	Reptisaurus	General Morgenstern	TV movie
2009	Ghost Town	Preacher McCready	TV movie
2011	The Lost Valentine	Neil Thomas Robinson Jr.	TV movie
2013	Star Trek New Voyages: Phase II	Admiral Sheehan	Episode - "Kitumba"
2014	Drop Dead Diva	George Blund	Episode - "Hope and Glory"
2015	Transformers: Robots in Disguise	Megatronus (voice)	3 episodes
