= Buck Rogers (serial) =

1939 film by Ford Beebe

- Directed by: Ford Beebe; Saul A. Goodkind
- Written by: Norman S. Hall; Ray Trampe; Dick Calkins
- Based on: Buck Rogers created by Philip Francis Nowlan
- Produced by: Barney A. Sarecky
- Starring: Buster Crabbe; Constance Moore; Jackie Moran; Anthony Warde; C. Montague Shaw; Jack Mulhall
- Cinematography: Jerome Ash
- Edited by: Joseph Gluck; Louis Sackin; Alvin Todd
- Distributed by: Universal Pictures
- Release date: April 11, 1939
- Running time: 237 minutes (12 chapters)
- Country: United States
- Language: English

Buck Rogers is a 1939 American science fiction film serial, produced by Universal Pictures. It stars Buster Crabbe (who had previously played the title character in two Flash Gordon serials and would return for a third in 1940) as the eponymous hero, Constance Moore, Jackie Moran and Anthony Warde. Episodes were directed by Ford Beebe and Saul A. Goodkind. The serial was written by Norman S. Hall, Ray Trampe and Dick Calkins based on the Buck Rogers character created by Philip Francis Nowlan, who had appeared in magazines and comic strips since 1928.

== Plot ==
In 1938, Lieutenant Buck Rogers and Buddy Wade are part of the crew of a dirigible flying over the North Pole. They are caught in a savage storm and crash. They are ordered to release the experimental Nirvano Gas, which (unbeknownst to them) will put them in suspended animation until they are rescued. The Nirvano Gas works, but the dirigible is buried in an avalanche and is not found until 500 years have passed. When Buck and Buddy are found, they awaken in the year 2440 to a world ruled by the ruthless dictator, Killer Kane), and his army of "super-racketeers". Only those who live in the "Hidden City", run by the benevolent scientist Dr. Huer and his military counterpart, Air Marshal Kragg, resist the criminal rulers of Earth.

Buck and Buddy join the resistance. They volunteer to go to Saturn, where they hope that they can find help in their fight against Kane. Wilma Deering is assigned to accompany them. Saturn is run by Aldar, the Council of the Wise and Prince Tallen. To the dismay of Buck and Buddy, they also discover that Kane has dispatched ambassadors of his own, headed by his loyal henchman, Captain Laska. The serial then becomes a back-and-forth struggle between Buck and Kane to secure the planet's military support.

=== Chapters ===
_{Source:}

1. "Tomorrow's World"
2. "Tragedy on Saturn"
3. "The Enemy's Stronghold"
4. "The Sky Patrol"
5. "The Phantom Plane"
6. "The Unknown Command"
7. "Primitive Urge"
8. "Revolt of the Zuggs"
9. "Bodies Without Minds"
10. "Broken Barriers"
11. "A Prince in Bondage"
12. "War of the Planets"

== Cast ==
- Buster Crabbe as Buck Rogers
- Constance Moore as Wilma Deering
- Jackie Moran as George "Buddy" Wade
- Anthony Warde as "Killer" Kane
- C. Montague Shaw as Doctor Huer
- Jack Mulhall as Captain Rankin
- Guy Usher as Aldar
- William Gould as Air Marshal Kragg
- Philson Ahn as Prince Tallen
- Henry Brandon as Captain Laska
- David Sharpe as Kane pilot / Hidden City sentry / Saturnian lieutenant

== Production ==
The 12-part serial launched in 1939. Buster Crabbe had played Flash Gordon in the serials of the same name and Flash Gordon's Trip to Mars. Constance Moore played Lieutenant Wilma Deering, the sole female character, and Jackie Moran as "Buddy" Wade, an original character who was modeled on the Sunday strip character Buddy Deering. Anthony Warde was cast as "Killer" Kane, Rogers' enemy; this was the only time that Warde, who usually portrayed evil underlings in serials, played a lead villain. Korean-American actor Philson Ahn, younger brother of Philip Ahn, played Prince Tallen, a Saturnian native who befriends Rogers.

Noted actor and "crown prince of stuntmen" David Sharpe, who appeared in over 4,500 films over the course of a seven-decade career, appeared in several roles.

The serial had a small budget and saved money on special effects by re-using material from other stories: background shots from the futuristic 1930 musical Just Imagine, as the city of the future, the garishly stenciled walls from the Azura palace set in Trip to Mars, and even the studded leather belt that Crabbe wore in Trip, turned up as part of Buck's uniform.

=== Feature adaptations ===
In 1953, the serial was edited into a feature film entitled Planet Outlaws, by Sherman Krellberg for release via Goodwill Pictures Inc. It was edited again to feature length and titled Destination Saturn for syndication to television, in 1965. Finally, the serial was edited once again into feature film format in the late 1970s, this version simply entitled Buck Rogers with the theatrical poster advertising, "Star Wars owes it all to Buck Rogers", and which was later sold on videotape in the early 1990s by VCI Entertainment as Planet Outlaws.

Both the original Planet Outlaws and Destination Saturn adaptations have been available in video format since the early 1980s, and as early as 1970 were also available for purchase in 16-mm film format from Thunderbird Pictures. VCI released the original serial on DVD in September 2000 before following up in November 2009 with a 70th anniversary edition including extras such as "The History of Buck Rogers" by Clifford "Laughing Gravy" Weimer, a photo gallery, and the 1935 Buck Rogers short feature originally shown at the 1933-34 World's Fair.

== Legacy ==
Planet Outlaws received comedic commentary treatment in 2018 as a "...Presents" feature by Matthew J. Elliott and Ian Potter as part of RiffTrax, an offshoot of cult movie-mocking TV series Mystery Science Theater 3000.

== See also ==
- List of film serials by year
- List of film serials by studio

Preceded by Scouts to the Rescue (1939)	Universal Serial; Buck Rogers (1939)	Succeeded by The Oregon Trail (1939)
