= Buck Rogers: A Life in the Future =

1995 novel by Martin Caidin

- First edition
- Author: Martin Caidin based upon characters by Philip Francis Nowlan
- Cover artist: Larry Elmore
- Language: English
- Series: Buck Rogers
- Genre: Science fiction
- Publisher: TSR, Inc.
- Publication date: September 15, 1995
- Publication place: United States
- Media type: Print (Hardback)
- Pages: 312
- ISBN: 0-7869-0144-6
- OCLC: 32989941
- Dewey Decimal: 813/.54 20
- LC Class: PS3553.A38 B83 1995

Buck Rogers: A Life in the Future is the title of a science fiction novel by Martin Caidin published in 1995.

The novel is a reimagining of Buck Rogers, a pulp fiction character created in the 1920s by Philip Francis Nowlan and later popularized in a long-running comic strip and in films and television. Caidin's novel was published by TSR, Inc., which also published a role-playing game based upon Nowlan's creation entitled Buck Rogers XXVC, which in turn spawned a series of novels.

== Plot ==
Caidin's novel retells the story of Anthony "Buck" Rogers, a top pilot who is mortally wounded in a Fokker plane crash. Given zero chance of survival with modern-day medical methods, Rogers is placed into suspended animation at Cyberdyne Systems, in the hopes that at some point in the future new technologies will render his injuries survivable. Ultimately, as civilizations rise and fall, Rogers is kept in stasis for five centuries before he is discovered and revived.

As with the original Buck Rogers story, the pilot must adjust to life in the 25th century while also helping Earth battle various invaders. Along the way he falls in love with Wilma Deering, a top pilot in the Space Corps.

== Bonus reprint ==
The first edition of the novel includes as a bonus a reprint of a 1933 children's book by Nowlan and Dick Calkins entitled Buck Rogers in the 25th Century, which was 32 pages long and in full color.
