= Eric Server =

American actor

- Born: December 4, 1944 (age 81); Santa Monica, California, US
- Occupations: Television, voice actor

Eric Server (born December 4, 1944 in Santa Monica, California) is an American television actor, best known for providing the voice of computer brain Dr. Theopolis in the 1979 TV series Buck Rogers in the 25th Century. From 1979 to 1981 he appeared as Lt. Jim Steiger in 17 episodes of B.J. and the Bear.
