= Jay Garner (actor) =

American actor (1929–2011)

- Born: James H. Garner Jr. January 17, 1929
- Died: January 21, 2011 (aged 82)

Jay Garner (January 17, 1929 – January 21, 2011), born James H. Garner Jr., was an American musical theatre, film, and television actor.

== Biography ==
Born James H. Garner Jr. in 1929 in Sewanee, Tennessee, he graduated from the University of Tennessee and moved to Atlanta, where he worked in radio and began acting. He changed his first name to Jay upon entering Actors Equity because there was already a James Garner in the union.

Garner was best known to theatre audiences for his diverse character roles, including the "side-stepping" Governor of Texas in the musical The Best Little Whorehouse in Texas. He debuted the role of the priggish anti-homosexual politician Eduord Dindon in La Cage Aux Folles and had the lead role of Georgia Governor Lester Maddox in Red, White and Maddox.

He played Benjamin Franklin in the musical hit 1776, a role he reprised on tour and in various stock productions. In 1986, he took over the role of Sir John Tremayne from Tony winner George S. Irving in the original Broadway staging of Me and My Girl. His last Broadway performance was Horace Vandergelder in the 1994 revival of Hello, Dolly! with Carol Channing.

Television audiences know him as Admiral Asimov in the second season of Buck Rogers in the 25th Century and as lecherous food critic Jason Defarge in Three's Company. On the big screen Garner appeared as Doctor Robinson in Silent Night, Bloody Night, and had a featured role in the Steve Martin film Pennies From Heaven, in which he played the banker who shares a dance and comic kiss with Martin.

=== Death ===
Garner died on January 21, 2011, in New York City after suffering from a respiratory illness, aged 82. An only child, he never married and left no immediate survivors.

== Selected filmography ==
Year	Title	Role	Notes
1971	Dynamite Chicken	Himself	
1972	Silent Night, Bloody Night	Doctor Robinson	
1981	Pennies from Heaven	The Banker	
1981	Buck Rogers in the 25th Century	Admiral Efram Asimov	TV series
1982	Hanky Panky	Buck	
1982	Three's Company	Jason Defarge	TV series
