= William Rogers (Canadian football) =

Canadian football player

Buck Rogers
Profile
- Positions: Tackle, Halfback

Personal information
- Born: May 6, 1928 (age 98); Ottawa, Ontario, Canada
- Listed height: 5 ft 11 in (1.80 m)
- Listed weight: 210 lb (95 kg)

Career history
- 1947–1948: Ottawa Rough Riders
- 1949: Saskatchewan Roughriders
- 1950–1952: Ottawa Rough Riders
- 1953–1955: Winnipeg Blue Bombers

Awards and highlights
- Grey Cup champion (1951)

William "Buck" Rogers (born May 6, 1928) is a Canadian former professional football player who played for the Ottawa Rough Riders, Saskatchewan Roughriders, and Winnipeg Blue Bombers. He won the Grey Cup with Ottawa in 1951.
