= Buck Rogers in the 25th Century (film) =

1979 film by Daniel Haller

- Theatrical release poster
- Directed by: Daniel Haller
- Written by: Glen A. Larson; Leslie Stevens
- Based on: Buck Rogers by Philip Francis Nowlan
- Produced by: Richard Caffey; Glen A. Larson
- Starring: Gil Gerard; Pamela Hensley; Erin Gray; Tim O'Connor; Henry Silva
- Narrated by: William Conrad
- Cinematography: Frank Beascoechea
- Edited by: John J. Dumas; David Howe; William Martin
- Music by: Stu Phillips
- Production company: Universal Pictures
- Distributed by: Universal Pictures
- Release date: March 30, 1979
- Running time: 89 minutes
- Country: United States
- Language: English
- Budget: $3.5 million
- Box office: $21.7 million

Buck Rogers in the 25th Century (also known as Buck Rogers) is a 1979 American superhero film directed by Daniel Haller. Starring Gil Gerard in the title role and Erin Gray as Colonel Wilma Deering, it was produced by Glen A. Larson, who co-wrote the screenplay with Leslie Stevens, based on the Buck Rogers character created by Philip Francis Nowlan. It was originally made as a television pilot, but Universal Pictures opted to release it as a theatrical film almost six months before the subsequent television series premiered.

== Plot ==
In 1987, NASA astronaut Captain William "Buck" Rogers is piloting a compact, one-man space shuttle Ranger 3 when he flies into an unexpected space phenomenon and is frozen for 504 years. In the year 2491, his shuttle is found drifting in space by the alien flagship Draconia, which is headed to Earth for a trade conference, under the command of Princess Ardala and her aide-de-camp, Kane, a former native of Earth. Rogers is revived from his cryogenic sleep and is questioned by the princess and Kane. Princess Ardala is visibly attracted to Buck, though Kane arranges for Buck to be placed back on his shuttle and returned toward Earth.

It turns out though the Draconians are actually planning to conquer the Earth through staged pirate attacks on Earth's shipping fleet, forcing Earth to seek a treaty with the Draconians and unwittingly opening up their defenses to the invaders. They plant a homing beacon aboard Buck's shuttle to track a direction through Earth's planet-wide defense shield. Buck is escorted through the defense shield by Colonel Wilma Deering of Earth's military forces. He lands in the futuristic city of "New Chicago," where he is interrogated and learns that Earth has been slowly rebuilt in the centuries during his absence following a nuclear holocaust, and now the Earth is in a developing state, with much of the planet outside of New Chicago a desolate, radioactive wasteland. During his time in the city, Buck meets Dr. Elias Huer, the leader of Earth's Defense Directorate, the AI computer Dr. Theopolis, and the robot drone Twiki, with the latter two attempting to help him adjust to his current surroundings.

While recounting his encounter with the Draconians, Buck notices several discrepancies and suspects that the Draconians must be armed, contrary to the terms of the trade meeting. Against advice, Buck ventures outside the city to the ruins of old Chicago in an attempt to see that what he has been told is real, eventually finding his own parents' grave and having to be rescued by Wilma and her troops from the violent mutants inhabiting the ruins. Following Buck's return to the Inner City, the Draconian tracking device is found aboard his ship, and the authorities accuse Buck of espionage and sentence him to death. Buck claims the Draconians simply used him, and Wilma persuades Dr. Huer to test Buck's claims by requesting a meeting with Princess Ardala and Kane aboard the Draconia. During the meeting, the pirate ships (actually Draconian marauders) attack their flagship as a diversion, but Buck manages to destroy them single-handedly, thus earning Wilma's respect.

At the official diplomatic reception on Earth, Ardala, who is still attracted to Buck, invites him back to the Draconia later that night. Buck uses the invitation to go aboard and find out the truth behind the Draconians' scheme. On the flagship, Ardala informs Buck she needs a man such as him to rule by her side and offers him the position. After drugging Ardala, Buck explores the flagship and discovers their marauders and imminent plans to attack Earth. Dr. Theopolis and Twiki, who have followed Buck aboard, eventually meet up with him and alert Earth to the Draconian invasion. Wilma immediately scrambles Earth's starfighters and attacks the Draconia, while Buck sabotages the Draconian marauders prepared to attack Earth and fights off Ardala's bodyguard, Tigerman. During the battle, the Draconia is critically damaged, but Buck, Theopolis and Twiki are rescued by Wilma before the flagship explodes. Ardala and Kane also escape the Draconia's destruction in an escape shuttle, with Kane vowing to return to take his revenge on Buck.

== Cast ==
- Gil Gerard as Captain William "Buck" Rogers
- Erin Gray as Colonel Wilma Deering
- Tim O'Connor as Dr. Elias Huer
- Pamela Hensley as Princess Ardala
- Henry Silva as Kane
- Howard F. Flynn as Voice of Dr. Theopolis
- Felix Silla as Twiki
- Mel Blanc as Voice of Twiki
- Duke Butler as Tigerman
- Joseph Wiseman as Emperor Draco

== Production ==
Inspired by the massive success of Star Wars the previous year, Universal began developing Buck Rogers for television, spearheaded by Glen A. Larson, who had a production deal with the studio. Initially, Larson and Universal had planned on making a series of Buck Rogers television movies for NBC.

Production began in 1978, however, the pilot for Larson's other sci-fi series, Battlestar Galactica (1978), had been theatrically released in some countries and in key locations in North America, and had done well at the box office.

Filming took place in Los Angeles, California, with some shots at the Westin Bonaventure Hotel. Several other stock shots portraying futuristic buildings on Earth are that of remaining pavilions on the site of Expo 67, including the British and French national pavilion (now open as the Montreal Casino). These were also included in the Battlestar Galactica episode "Greetings from Earth" (1979), said to be a city on the planet Paradeen (though in production around the same time, the episode aired a month before the release of the film). Buck's NASA shuttle, Ranger 3, was itself a prop that had been seen in this same episode where it was used as Michael's Lunar-7 shuttle though painted a different color.

The film was initially slated for a September 1978 release, but filming was repeatedly delayed due to casting problems. In an unusual move, a nine-minute featurette was provided to play in theatres in addition to a traditional 2.5 minute trailer. The film was released on March 30, 1979, to box office success, grossing over $21 million in North America with later international release. As a result, NBC commissioned a weekly series, commencing on September 20, 1979, with a slightly modified version of the theatrical release. Scenes were deleted, others added to link to the ongoing series, and the suggestive opening credit sequence was replaced with a more generic version.

Princess Ardala's father, Emperor Draco (played by Joseph Wiseman), originally had several scenes that were ultimately deleted. His only remaining scene is as a holographic image reprimanding Kane in the climax. Despite this brief appearance, images of Draco appeared prominently in various Buck Rogers merchandise, and 12" and 3¾" Draco action figures were produced by the toy company Mego. Wiseman would later appear in the weekly television series, playing a different character, Carl Morphus, in the episode "Vegas in Space" (1979).

== Soundtrack ==
The movie's opening credits featured a song, "Suspension", sung by Kipp Lennon and co-written by Glen A. Larson. An instrumental version of the song was used as the main theme for the television series that followed, though the vocal version of the song was used again for the ending credits of the season one finale "Flight of the War Witch" (1980).

== Reception ==
The movie received a mixed reception from critics. On review aggregator Rotten Tomatoes, the film holds a score of 25% based on 12 reviews with an average rating of 4.3/10. On Metacritic, the film holds a weighted average score of 45 out of 100 based on eight critics, indicating "mixed to average reviews".

The movie opened in the United States and Canada in 935 theaters and grossed $4,579,500 in its opening weekend. It expanded the following weekend to 1,405 theaters, grossing $10,576,452 in its first 10 days.

== Home media ==
The movie has been released on video several times since the 1980s, and was released on DVD in the Buck Rogers in the 25th Century series boxed set released on November 16, 2004. This was in lieu of the television broadcast version (entitled "Awakening") which contained some different scenes. When the first season was issued again on DVD on January 24, 2012, the boxed set still contained the theatrical version of the movie. However, the television version of the movie was finally released on DVD as a bonus feature in a reissued boxed set of Season Two on January 8, 2013. Kino Lorber released a single-disc Blu-ray of the theatrical cut on November 24, 2020, featuring a new 2K master and finally preserving the movie's original 1.85:1 aspect ratio.

== In other media ==
The story was adapted for comic books in the Gold Key series Buck Rogers in the 25th Century #2-4, and reprinted in the Buck Rogers Giant Movie Edition published the same year in a joint production between Marvel Comics and Whitman Publishing. The creative team included Paul S. Newman on script, and Frank Bolle, Al McWilliams and Ray Bailey on artwork.
