= Buck Rogers in the 25th Century (TV series) =

American sci-fi adventure TV series (1979–1981)

- Genre: Science fiction; Adventure
- Based on: Characters by Philip Francis Nowlan
- Developed by: Glen A. Larson; Leslie Stevens
- Starring: Gil Gerard; Erin Gray; Tim O'Connor (season 1); Felix Silla; Mel Blanc; Eric Server (season 1); Thom Christopher (season 2); Jay Garner (season 2); Wilfrid Hyde-White (season 2)
- Composers: Stu Phillips (theme); Johnny Harris (theme)
- Country of origin: United States
- No. of seasons: 2
- No. of episodes: 37 (list of episodes)

Production
- Running time: 60 min. (with commercials)
- Production companies: Glen A. Larson Productions; Bruce Lansbury Productions; John Mantley Productions; Leisure Concepts; Universal Television

Original release
- Network: NBC
- Release: September 20, 1979 – April 16, 1981

Buck Rogers in the 25th Century is an American science fiction adventure television series produced by Universal Studios. The series ran for two seasons between September 1979 and April 1981 on NBC, and the feature-length pilot episode for the series was released as a theatrical film before the series aired. The film and series were developed by Glen A. Larson and Leslie Stevens, based on the character Buck Rogers created in 1928 by Philip Francis Nowlan that had previously been featured in comic strips, novellas, a serial film, and on television and radio.

== Overview ==
=== Film ===
Originally intended as the pilot for the show and meant to air on television, the movie was, instead, released theatrically in March 1979 as Buck Rogers in the 25th Century. The film made $21 million at the North American box office, prompting Universal to move ahead with a weekly series later that year. The film, which was also released internationally, featured all of the main protagonist characters who would appear in the weekly series, and it also included Princess Ardala of the planet Draconia and her henchman, Kane.

=== Series ===
The theatrical film also served as a pilot and two-part first episode for the series, entitled "Awakening". Several scenes were edited, some to remove the more adult dialogue in the film, including when Buck refers to Wilma as "ballsy", and later when he says "shit", and a scene in which Buck kills Ardala's henchman, Tigerman, was edited to not show Buck kicking him in the groin.

Also, some new and extended scenes were added for the TV version, including several scenes within Buck's new apartment, which was the setting for a new final scene in which Dr. Huer and Wilma try to persuade Buck to join the Defense Directorate. This scene ends with Buck actually declining their offer, though he opts to join them in an unofficial capacity by the first episode of the series proper, "Planet of the Slave Girls". In this unofficial role, Buck does everything from acting as a covert agent on various undercover assignments to assisting Wilma as a flight/combat instructor. Buck is, most often, partnered with Wilma, with whom he often shares a flirtatious relationship.

Including the two-part pilot episode, the first season consists of 24 episodes, with four of the stories being two-parters. The tone of the series is lighter than the pilot movie and shows a more positive picture of future Earth. The Inner City is now known as New Chicago; human civilization is established as having spread once again across the planet and also to the stars. After the movie pilot, no reference to barren radioactive wastelands was made and, in several episodes, the world outside is shown as lush and green. The mutants seen in the pilot film are no longer seen, and Buck sometimes ventures outside New Chicago with no hazards encountered. As opposed to the isolationist planet seen in the film, Earth no longer has an invisible defense shield surrounding it and is shown to be the center of an interstellar, human-dominated government, sometimes called "the Federation" or "the Alliance", with its capital at New Chicago. During the first season, references were also made to other "new" Earth cities such as New Detroit, New Manhattan, New Phoenix, New Tulsa, Boston Complex, and New London. A "City-on-the-Sea" was also seen, mentioned as being the former New Orleans.

Wilma Deering and Dr. Huer were the only Defense Directorate personnel seen in every episode, though several others were seen in individual episodes. Most Defense Directorate personnel regard Buck as being at least an "honorary" captain, in reference to his 20th-century U.S. military rank, but his membership in Earth's defense forces is unofficial. Nevertheless, Buck often flies with the fighter squadrons and uses his 20th-century U.S. Air Force background to assist in their training. Dr. Huer regularly meets, greets, and otherwise deals with representatives of other sovereign powers. Huer was also seen in military uniform (at formal occasions), thus indicating he is or was a member of the military.

Travel between the stars was accomplished with the use of "stargates"—artificially created portals in space (similar in appearance to wormholes), but referred to as "warp" travel on at least one occasion by Wilma Deering. Stargates appear as a diamond-shaped quartet of brilliant lights in space that shimmer when a vessel is making transit. Some people find the transit through a stargate to be physically unpleasant (transit resembling a "spinning" of the spacecraft). Buck's dislike of them is shown in part one of the episode "Planet of the Slave Girls" and again in part two of the episode "The Plot to Kill a City".

To portray futuristic-looking buildings on Earth, the show used stock shots of the remaining national Expo 67 pavilions, particularly the French and British pavilions, as well as shots of the Bonaventure Hotel in downtown Los Angeles.

Juanin Clay, who played Major Marla Landers in the first-season episode "Vegas in Space", was originally cast as Wilma for the TV series. (Erin Gray had initially opted not to return after the pilot film, but she later changed her mind.) Wilma's personality was softened considerably in the series. While she was still seen as a strong, confident and consummate professional in her work, she had a much more relaxed attitude and a warmer relationship with Buck. A potentially romantic relationship between Buck and Wilma was hinted at, but rarely expanded upon, and, in the first season, Buck was involved (to some degree) with a different woman almost every week. Producers demanded that Wilma have blonde hair, so dye jobs were needed to lighten Erin Gray's brunette locks. During the final episodes of the first season, Gray was allowed to return to her natural hair color, and Wilma was dark-haired throughout season two. Buck's best-known enemy during the first season was Princess Ardala, played by Pamela Hensley, whose desire was to conquer and possess both Earth and Buck himself. She appeared in four separate stories, including the pilot film, two single episodes ("Escape from Wedded Bliss" and "Ardala Returns"), and the two-part first-season finale ("Flight of the War Witch").

The opening title sequence for the series included stock footage from the Apollo 4 and Apollo 6 launches.

The series had an overall budget of $800,000 per hour of air time, according to Starlog issue #32 (March 1980). Former actor Jock Gaynor served as producer for 20 episodes. Although reasonably popular with viewers, the first season failed to receive much critical acclaim. One vocal critic of the series was Gerard himself, who pushed for more serious storytelling and often clashed with the producers and the network (NBC) over the show's tone and handling. He often arbitrarily refused to perform some of the more comical lines in the scripts he was given, complaining that Buck was just a "wise-ass" who was making one joke after another, and he often rewrote scripts himself to place more emphasis on his own character at the expense of others (for example, in the episode "Escape From Wedded Bliss", the script originally called for Buck to be rescued from the Draconians at the end by Wilma, but Gerard vetoed the idea).

Unhappy with the show's direction, Gerard became increasingly difficult to work with, which led to tensions on set. A meeting between writers/script editors Anne Collins and Alan Brennert and him went badly, and they quit the show midway through the first season. Gerard himself was threatened with legal action by the network if he continued to cause problems and hinder the production. In the November 1980 issue of Starlog, Gerard even said he had hoped the series would not be picked up for a second season because he had no wish to go through another season like the first one.

=== Second season ===
Production of the second season was delayed by several months due to the 1980 actors strike. When production resumed in the fall of 1980, the series had a new set of producers (headed by John Mantley, who had primarily worked on television Westerns) and the format of the series was changed. Instead of defending the Earth from external threats, Buck, Wilma, and Twiki were now a part of a crew aboard an Earth spaceship called the Searcher on a mission to seek out the lost "tribes" of humanity who had scattered in the five centuries since Earth's 20th-century nuclear war, a theme present in Glen A. Larson's previous science-fiction television series, Battlestar Galactica.

Another notable change in the second season was the disappearance of many of the regular characters of the first season, such as Dr. Huer, Dr. Theopolis, Princess Ardala, and Kane. However, several new characters were added:

- Admiral Efram Asimov (Jay Garner) is the commander of the Searcher and a descendant of the famous science-fiction author Isaac Asimov.
- Hawk (Thom Christopher) is an alien character who represents the last of the nearly extinct bird people.
- Dr. Goodfellow (Wilfrid Hyde-White) is an elderly scientist with insatiable curiosity.
- Crichton (voiced by Jeff David) is a snobbish robot built by Goodfellow who finds believing that lowly humans could have built him to be difficult.

The character of Wilma Deering was softened in the second season as the producers attempted to tone down the militaristic "Colonel Deering" image (who often gave Buck orders) and to make her more feminine. Another change in the second season was the sound of Twiki's voice. Because of illness, Mel Blanc was replaced by Bob Elyea as the voice of Twiki for the first five episodes of the second season. After recovering, Blanc returned to the role for the final six episodes of the season, though no explanation was given for the change in Twiki's voice.

The substance of the storylines also changed in the second season. Less emphasis was placed on militaristic ideals and, with a few exceptions, Gerard scaled back the humor in the second season in favor of more serious episodes (with the final episode of the series ending on a somber note as a result). Buck and Wilma's relationship became slightly more romantic during the second year, though most romantic activity was implied and took place off-screen.

Moreover, the second season deals with more serious concepts such as evolution, ecology, racism, pollution, war, nuclear power, identity, the self, and religion. It also draws on mythology as exemplified by Hawk's people, who are variants on the bird people found in ancient tales around the world, and makes special reference to the moai of Easter Island. An episode also included a story about satyr creatures.

In addition to its parallels to Larson's previous television series Battlestar Galactica, the second season is similar in theme to Star Trek, with the Searcher roaming through space much like the USS Enterprise had, Buck being the maverick explorer true to the style of Captain James T. Kirk, and the serious, rather stoic Hawk being a revamped version of Mr. Spock. Even Wilma, to some extent, had been remodeled after Lt. Uhura from Star Trek, often dressed in a miniskirt uniform and regularly sitting at a communications console on the bridge of the Searcher.

Although initially pleased with the change in personnel, Gerard again became unhappy with the show. At the time of production, Gerard spoke highly of new showrunner John Mantley, but in a retrospective article in the mid-1990s, he was more critical of him and the Star Trek-esque style of the second season. Ratings dropped significantly after the season premiere and, coupled with an increasingly problematic star, NBC cancelled the series at the end of an 11-episode, strike-abbreviated season. No finale storyline was produced, with the final episode broadcast being a normal standalone episode.

== Cast ==
=== Main ===
- Gil Gerard – Captain William "Buck" Rogers
- Erin Gray – Colonel Wilma Deering
- Tim O'Connor – Elias Huer
- Felix Silla – Twiki (physical performance)
  - Patty Maloney – Twiki (three episodes)
- Mel Blanc – Voice of Twiki (first season, plus second-season episodes starting with 2.08 "The Crystals" through 2.12 "Testimony of a Traitor")
  - Bob Elyea – Voice of Twiki (second-season episodes starting with 2.01 "Time of the Hawk Part 1" through 2.07 "The Golden Man")

=== First season only ===
- Pamela Hensley – Princess Ardala (four episodes)
- Michael Ansara – Kane (three episodes) (played by Henry Silva in the theatrical/pilot film)
- Hard Boiled Haggerty – Tigerman (three episodes) (played by Duke Butler in the theatrical/pilot film)
- Eric Server – Voice of Dr. Theopolis (first season) (voiced by Howard F. Flynn in the theatrical/pilot film)
- William Conrad – Narrator (first season)

=== Second season only ===
- Wilfrid Hyde-White – Dr. Goodfellow
- Thom Christopher – Hawk
- Jay Garner – Admiral Efram Asimov
- Paul Carr – Lt. Devlin
- Dennis Haysbert – various characters (5 episodes)
- Hank Simms – Narrator (second season)
- Jeff David – Voice of Crichton
- Bob Elyea – Voice of Twiki (second-season episodes 2.01 "Time of the Hawk" to 2.07 "The Golden Man")

=== Guest stars ===
Buster Crabbe, who had played Buck Rogers in the original 1930s Buck Rogers film serial, plays Brigadier Gordon (a reference to his other famous role, Flash Gordon).

Joseph Wiseman also appeared in the episode "Vegas In Space" playing the character Morphus, and he was also briefly seen in the theatrical version of the pilot as Emperor Draco (Princess Ardala's father), but his appearance was edited out of the television version.

Several actors who had played villains in the 1960s Batman television series guest-starred, including Cesar Romero, Frank Gorshin, Roddy McDowall, and Julie Newmar.

Other guest stars include:

- Peter Graves
- Lance LeGault
- Jamie Lee Curtis
- Markie Post
- Dorothy Stratten
- Leigh McCloskey
- Trisha Noble
- Richard Moll
- Jerry Orbach
- Gary Coleman
- Jack Palance
- Sam Jaffe
- Sid Haig
- Vera Miles
- William Smith
- Anne Lockhart
- Anthony James
- John Quade
- Victor Argo
- Ann Dusenberry
- Ray Walston
- Earl Boen
- Nicolas Coster
- BarBara Luna
- Michael Fox

== Concept and broadcast history ==
Inspired by Star Wars' success, Universal began developing Buck Rogers for television, spearheaded by Glen A. Larson, who had a production deal with the studio. Production began in 1978. Initially, Larson and Universal had planned on making a series of TV movies for NBC. The pilot for Larson's other science-fiction series, Battlestar Galactica (1978), had been released theatrically in some countries and in key locations in North America, and it had done well at the box office. Universal then opted to theatrically release the first Buck Rogers TV movie on March 30, 1979. Good box-office returns led NBC to commission a weekly series, commencing on September 20, 1979, with a slightly modified version of the theatrical release.

The production recycled many of the props, effects shots, and costumes from Galactica, which was still in production at the time the Buck Rogers pilot was being filmed. For example, the "landram" vehicle was made for the Galactica series, and the control sticks used in the Terran starfighters in the pilot movie were the same as those used in Galactica's Viper craft. The Terran starfighters were also concept designer Ralph McQuarrie's original vision of the Colonial Vipers.

The new series centered on Captain William Anthony "Buck" Rogers (Gil Gerard), a NASA/USAF pilot who commands Ranger 3, a spacecraft launched in May 1987. Due to a life-support malfunction, Buck is accidentally frozen for 504 years before his spacecraft is discovered adrift in 2491. The combination of gases that froze his body coincidentally comes close to the formula commonly used in the 25th century for cryopreservation, and his rescuers are able to revive him. He learns that civilization on Earth was rebuilt following a devastating nuclear war (later established as occurring on November 22, 1987) and is now under the protection of the Earth Defense Directorate.

The series followed him as he tried (not always successfully) to fit into 25th-century culture. Even though no traceable personal records of him remained, his piloting and combat skills and ingenuity made him ideally suited to help Earth Defense foil assorted evil plots to conquer the planet. In many respects, this version of Buck Rogers was more similar to James Bond or Steve Austin than Nowlan's original character, and Buck often went undercover on various covert missions. Buck is aided in his adventures by his friend and sometimes romantic interest, Colonel Wilma Deering (Erin Gray), a high-ranking officer and starfighter pilot. He is also assisted by Twiki, a small robot or "ambuquad", as they were known. Twiki was played mainly by Felix Silla and voiced mainly by Mel Blanc (who voiced Daffy Duck as Duck Dodgers in spoofs of the early Buck Rogers and other science-fiction serials) using a gruff voice very similar to the one he used for Barnyard Dawg. Twiki became Buck's comic sidekick and communicated with an electronic noise that sounded like "biddi-biddi-biddi", but also spoke English (usually preceded by "biddi-biddi-biddi-biddi"). Twiki often employed 20th-century slang that he learned from Buck. Also aiding Buck was Dr. Theopolis or "Theo" (voiced by Eric Server), a sentient computer in the shape of a disk about nine inches in diameter with an illuminated face. He was capable of understanding Twiki's electronic language and was usually carried around Twiki's neck. Theo was a member of Earth's "computer council" and one of the planet's scientific leaders. During the first season, Buck and Wilma took their orders from Dr. Elias Huer (Tim O'Connor), the head of the Defense Directorate. Some episodes suggest Huer was the leader of the entire planet, though this was never made completely clear.

The series' chief villain in the first season was Princess Ardala (Pamela Hensley), whose goal was to conquer the Earth while making Buck her consort. She was aided by her henchman Kane (Henry Silva in the pilot and Michael Ansara in the series). All of these characters were featured in the original comic strip except for Dr. Theopolis and Twiki. Kane (or Killer Kane as he was then known) was also featured in the 1939 film serial and was actually the chief villain himself, rather than a henchman; Ardala did not appear in the film serial.

The pilot depicts Earth as fairly insular, with an invisible defense shield that surrounds the entire planet, protecting it from invaders. Civilization is restricted to a few cities; the primary city seen in the pilot and weekly series was New Chicago (also known as the Inner City). Travel beyond the Inner City was hazardous, as much of the planet was said to be a radioactive wasteland inhabited by violent mutants (as Buck discovered when he visited the derelict remains of old Chicago). The TV series depicted a rather more robust Earth; it still had desolate regions, but additional cities were also featured, such as a 25th-century version of New Orleans. The series also had numerous episodes set on other inhabited planets, with the introduction of "stargates" that allowed for quick transportation between different star systems.

=== Episodes ===
Season	Episodes	Originally released	
Season	Episodes	First released	Last released
1	24	September 20, 1979	March 27, 1980
2	13	January 15, 1981	April 16, 1981

=== International broadcast ===
Buck Rogers was originally shown in the UK by ITV, beginning on 30 August 1980 from 6:15pm–8:00pm, with the feature-length, two-part episode "Planet of the Slave Girls" (the pilot film, theatrically released in Britain in summer 1979, was not actually shown on British television until September 1982). ITV continued to broadcast Buck Rogers in an early Saturday-evening slot, usually from 5:45pm–6:45pm, where it competed against, and beat, the BBC's long-running science-fiction series Doctor Who in the ratings for 16 straight weeks from 30 August to 13 December 1980. Doctor Who had also started its 18th season broadcast on 30 August 1980. As a similar effect had occurred a few times in previous years, such as when several ITV regional stations had screened Man from Atlantis against Doctor Who from September to December 1977, the success of Buck Rogers in the ITV ratings prompted the BBC to move Doctor Who to earlier time slots on Saturday starting on 11 October 1980, so that it would start slightly earlier than Buck Rogers and thus give it an advantage. However, the move had no effect and Buck Rogers continued to dominate Doctor Who in the ratings battle. When Buck Rogers returned to the ITV schedules on 7 February 1981 after an 8-week break, it was no longer directly up against Doctor Who, with Buck Rogers in its usual 5:45pm–6:45pm slot and Doctor Who moved to 5:10pm–5:35pm. Regardless, the BBC opted to move Doctor Who to new weekday slots for its next season in 1982, even though Buck Rogers had been cancelled in the US by then.

The BBC aired Buck Rogers on BBC Two in 1989 and again in 1995-1996. The (now defunct) Forces TV channel later broadcast the show several times from November 2018.

The series also aired in Canada on CTV, on the same day and time as the NBC airings.

== Home media ==
The theatrical version of the pilot film was released on VHS, Betamax, and Laserdisc in 1981. A handful of the episodes were issued in the US in 1985 by MCA Home Video: "Vegas in Space", "Space Vampire", "Return of the Fighting 69th", "Unchained Woman", "A Blast for Buck", "Happy Birthday Buck", "Space Rockers", and "The Guardians". In 1987, a single episode, "Ardala Returns", was released by Goodtimes Home Video, a budget release company. The same MCA tapes were re-released in the late 1990s. In other countries, several series episodes were released on VHS in the late 1990s. Australia released 10 volumes, covering all first-season episodes through "Space Rockers".

Universal Studios released the complete series on DVD in North America (Region 1) on November 16, 2004. While it does contain every episode from both seasons, the pilot episode included is the theatrical version and not the TV version. The set contains five double-sided discs.

The series was released on DVD in Europe (Region 2), though each season was released separately as opposed to in one set like the Region 1 release. Season one was released on November 22, 2004, and season two on October 31, 2005, neither of which had the same cover artwork or menu screens as the Region 1 release. Notable differences are the addition of subtitles for various European languages.

On January 24, 2012, Universal Studios re-released season one as a six-disc set in North America. The discs were single-sided for this release, in contrast to the double-sided discs released in 2004. Season two was re-released with single-sided discs on January 8, 2013. As a bonus feature, the second-season set includes the television version of the original pilot film, "Awakening", the first time this version has been released on DVD.

On August 17, 2016, Madman Entertainment released the series on Blu-ray to Australia and New Zealand in 1080p. The eight-disc set includes each episode in high definition (HD). Extras include theatrical version of the pilot episode and feature-length version of "Flight of the War Witch" (both in standard definition), the syndicated two-part version of "Journey to Oasis" (in HD), textless opening and closing credits sequences, opening credits without voice-over narration, and isolated music and effects audio tracks on each episode. The Blu-ray sets have been released in various other countries since.

Kino Lorber announced a Region 1 Blu-ray set to be released on November 24, 2020. It includes the movie (in HD for the first time on home media) and seasons one and two.

== Reception ==
Contemporary assessments of Buck Rogers in the 25th Century were generally mixed. In his book Sci-Fi TV from Twilight Zone to Deep Space Nine, writer James Van Hise opined that the show's scripts "just never took advantage of what they had at hand" and criticized Larson's version of Buck Rogers as a cynical attempt to exploit one of the most loved characters in American popular culture. John Javna's book The Best of Science Fiction TV included Buck Rogers in the 25th Century on its list of the "Worst Science Fiction Shows of All Time" (along with The Starlost, Space: 1999, and Manimal). Journalist Bill Lengeman also strongly criticized the program, stating "the acting is so wooden that Ed Wood himself (no pun intended) would surely have gone weak in the knees and wept openly upon witnessing it." Lengemen also called the Buck Rogers episode "Space Rockers" the worst episode of TV science fiction he had ever seen. On a more positive note, writing in the UK's Observer newspaper in October 1980 (shortly after the series began showing there), journalist Clive James stated, "the best comic-strip science fiction on at the moment is Buck Rogers in the 25th Century. The hardware looks good and Wilma Deering looks simply sensational, like Wonder Woman with brains."

Filmink thought the series did not live up to its pilot, in particular the Buck–Wilma–Ardala triangle, arguing "the writers forgot the simple motivations and characterisations. Poor old Wilma was disempowered and shunted to the side, where she held Buck's water while he had adventures and was thus no threat to Ardala (this was reportedly due to Gil Gerard's sulking over the prominence given to Wilma on the show). They also forgot Ardala's motivation was to use Buck politically to get an edge on her 23 siblings, not just because she found him hot. Pamela Hensley was everything you wanted in a silly '70s sci-fi epic and on one hand the producers knew it (they kept bringing her back), but on the other they didn't know how to exploit it."

== Merchandise ==
Two novels were published by Dell Publishing based on this series, both by Addison E. Steele. The first (ISBN 0-440-10843-8) was a novelization of the pilot film. The second, That Man on Beta (ISBN 0-440-10948-5), was adapted from an unproduced script for an episode or sequel film. A fumetti book entitled Buck Rogers in the 25th Century was published by Fotonovel Publications in 1979, reproducing the theatrical version of the pilot episode. A book for children, Buck Rogers and the Children of Hopetown, was published as a Little Golden Book in 1979.

Two sets of action figures were produced by Mego, including a 12-inch line and a series of 3.75-inch figures and scaled spaceships. Milton Bradley produced a Buck Rogers board game and a series of jigsaw puzzles. Other companies produced a variety of tie-ins. Monogram produced 1/48-scale, injection-molded model kits of the Earth Defense Directorate Starfighter and the Draconian Marauder from 1979 through 1981. Die-cast toys released by Corgi, Topps trading cards, and a painted metal lunch box were among the other merchandise.

Gold Key Comics (later known as Whitman Comics) produced about a dozen issues of a comic book between 1979 and 1982, with the first three issues adapting the film and the series continuing after the TV series ended. An original novella based upon the series, Lo, The Rings Of Saturn: Draconian Fire by Andrew E.C. Gaska was published by Blam! Ventures in 2016. Intended to be the first of a series of books based on the series, only the first book has been published to date.
