= Philip Francis Nowlan =

American novelist (1888–1940)

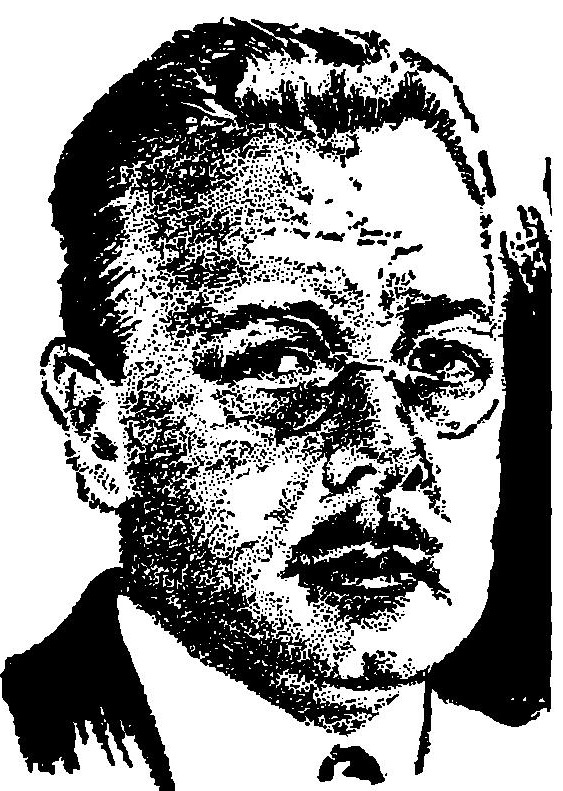
- Philip Francis Nowlan, as pictured in Science Wonder Stories, September 1929 (as "Frank Phillips")
- Born: November 13, 1888; Philadelphia, Pennsylvania, U.S.
- Died: February 3, 1940 (aged 51); Bala Cynwyd, Pennsylvania, U.S.
- Occupation: Writer
- Writing career
- Period: 1928–1940
- Genre: Science fiction
- Subject: Buck Rogers
- Notable work: Armageddon 2419 A.D.

Philip Francis Nowlan (/ˈnoʊlən/; November 13, 1888 – February 1, 1940) was an American science fiction writer, best known as the creator of Buck Rogers.

== Biography ==
Nowlan was born on November 13, 1888. While attending the University of Pennsylvania, Nowlan was a member of The Mask and Wig Club, holding significant roles in the annual productions between 1907 and 1909. After attending the University of Pennsylvania he worked as a newspaper columnist. Nowlan was married to Theresa Junker, and they had ten children.

He moved to the Philadelphia suburb of Bala Cynwyd and created and wrote the Buck Rogers comic strip, illustrated by Dick Calkins. He remained a writer on the strip until 1939. The comic strip ran from 1929 to 1967. Spin-offs included a radio-serial series Buck Rogers in the 25th Century (sporadically aired from 1932 to 1947), a 1939 movie serial Buck Rogers, a brief 1950–1951 television series, and a 1979–1981 television series Buck Rogers in the 25th Century.

Nowlan also wrote several other novellas for the science fiction magazines as well as the posthumously published mystery, The Girl from Nowhere. He died from a stroke at his home in Bala in 1940.

== Works ==
- Armageddon 2419 A.D. (1928)
- The Girl from Nowhere (1928, ISBN 0-8095-0038-8 (Neuauflage von 2005)
- The Airlords of Han (1929)
- The Onslaught from Venus (1929)
- The Time Jumpers (1934)
- The Prince of Mars Returns (1940)
- Space Guards (1940)
- Wings Over Tomorrow: The Collected Science Fiction of Philip Francis Nowlan (2005, ISBN 0-8095-1095-2)

== See also ==
- List of Buck Rogers comic strips
