= Buck Rogers in the 25th Century (radio series) =

- Genre: Science fiction radio serial, Aviation radio series.
- Running time: 15 minutes
- Country of origin: United States
- Language(s): English
- Home station: Mutual Broadcasting System
- Syndicates: CBS
- Starring: Matt Crowley; Curtis Arnall; Carl Frank; John Larkin; Adele Ronson; Edgar Stehli
- Announcer: Paul Douglas, Fred Uttal, Kenny Williams
- Written by: Dick Calkins, Joe Cross, Jack Johnstone, Albert Miller, Dee Falkinburg
- Directed by: Carlo De Angelo, Jack Johnstone
- Original release: November 7, 1932 – March 28, 1947
- No. of episodes: 860 (estimated)
- Sponsored by: Kellogg's, Cocomalt, Cream of Wheat, Popsicles, Fudgsicles, Creamsicles

Buck Rogers in the 25th Century was a radio drama series based on the popular novel and comics series Buck Rogers. It aired in 1932–1936, 1939, 1940 and 1946–1947, and it was notable for being the first science fiction radio show.

== Broadcasting history ==
Buck Rogers was initially broadcast as a 15-minute show on CBS Radio, from Monday through Thursday. It first ran from November 7, 1932, until May 22, 1936 . In 1936, it moved to a Monday, Wednesday, Friday schedule and went off the air the same year (720 episodes, 180 hours). Mutual Broadcasting System brought the show back and broadcast it three days a week from April 5 to July 31, 1939 (51 episodes, 12.75 hours), and from May 18 to July 27, 1940, a 30-minute version was broadcast on Saturdays (11 episodes, 5.5 hours). From September 30, 1946, to March 28, 1947, Mutual aired a 15-minute version on weekdays (78 episodes 19.5 hours).

The show was directed by Carlo De Angelo and Jack Johnstone. De Angelo also produced it. Sound effects were provided by Ora Daigle Nichols. In 1988, Johnstone recalled how he worked with the sound effects of Ora Nichols to produce the sound of the rockets by using an air-conditioning vent. Dick Calkins, who also made the comic strip, wrote the scripts.

Actors Matt Crowley, Curtis Arnall, Carl Frank and John Larkin all voiced Buck Rogers at various times. Wilma Deering was portrayed by Adele Ronson, and the brilliant scientist-inventor Dr. Huer was played by Edgar Stehli.

== Cast ==
- Buck Rogers: Matt Crowley, Curtis Arnall, Carl Frank, John Larkin
- Wilma Deering: Adele Ronson
- Dr. Huer: Edgar Stehli
- Black Barney: Jack Roseleigh, Joe Granby
- Buddy: Ronald Liss
- Ardala Valmar: Elaine Melchior
- Killer Kane: William "Bill" Shelley, Dan Ocko, Arthur Vinton
