= Dick Calkins =

American cartoonist (1894–1962)

- Born: Richard William Calkins; August 12, 1894 Grand Rapids, Michigan, U.S.
- Died: May 12, 1962 (aged 67) Tucson, Arizona, U.S.
- Areas: Writer, Artist
- Notable works: Buck Rogers; Skyroads
- Spouse: Margaret

Richard William Calkins (August 12, 1894 – May 12, 1962), who often signed his work Lt. Dick Calkins, was an American comic strip artist who is best known for being the first artist to draw the Buck Rogers comic strip. He also wrote for the Buck Rogers radio program.

== Biography ==
Born in Grand Rapids, Michigan, Calkins graduated from the Chicago Art Institute. His first job was cartoonist for the Detroit Free Press. During World War I, Calkins served in the Army Air Service as a pilot and flight instructor.

Following the war, he worked as an editorial cartoonist for the Chicago American until 1929, the year he began drawing Buck Rogers. (Calkins is credited as the artist for Buck Rogers from January 1929 to November 1947, and writer from September 1939 to November 1947, but other sources indicate he stopped drawing the strip around 1932.)

Calkins also co-created and illustrated the aviation-themed comic strip Skyroads, with aviation pioneer and fellow World War I pilot Lester J. Maitland, from 1929 to 1933 (when it was taken over by Russell Keaton). (Keaton has also been credited with ghosting the Sunday Buck Rogers, which debuted on March 30, 1930.

Calkins died at the age of 67 in Tucson, Arizona, on May 12, 1962, as the result of a heart attack.

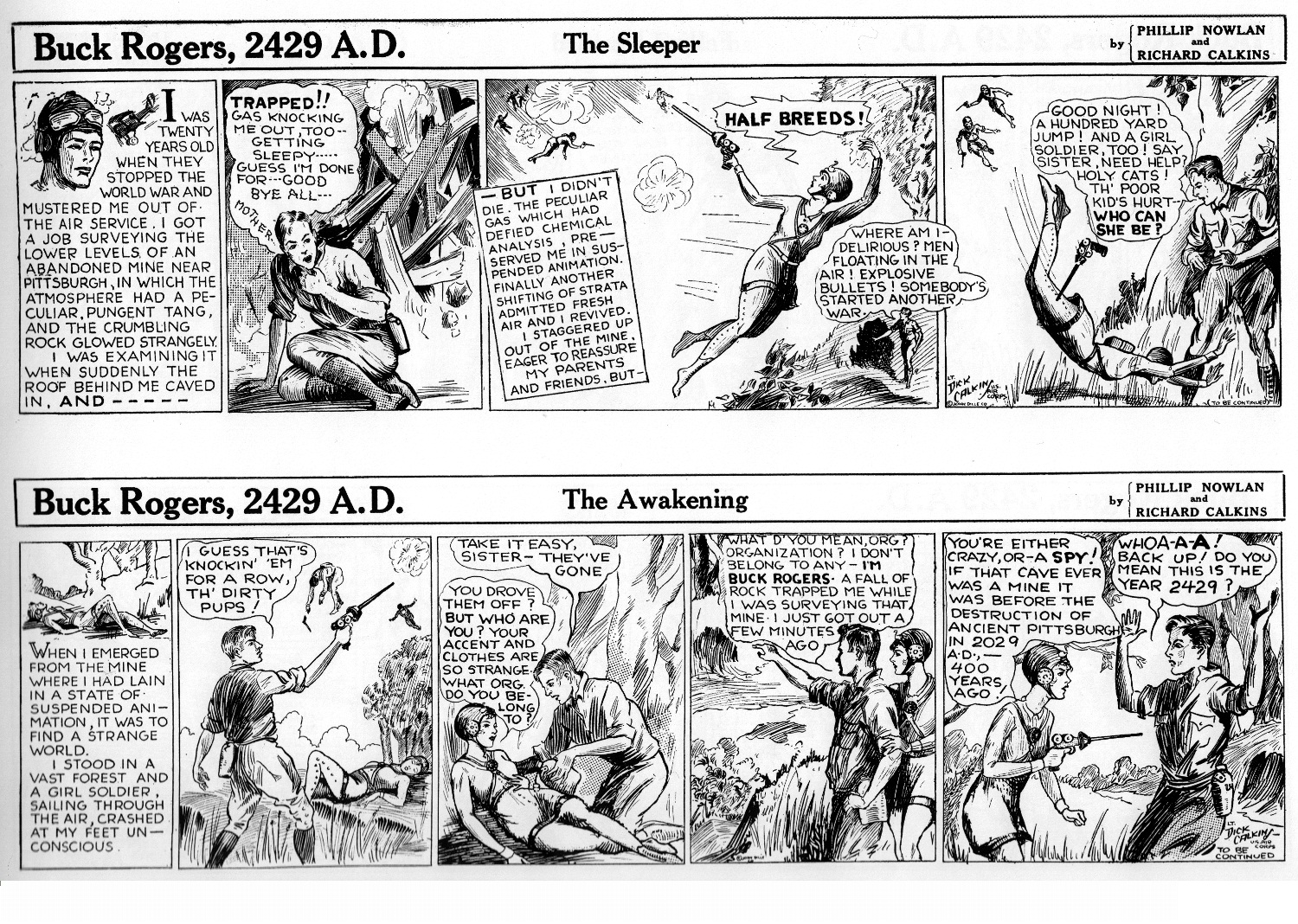
Buck Rogers by Dick Calkins (1929)

== Selected publications ==
- Uncle Bob's Story Book. Chicago: Jordan, 1926.
- Buck Rogers in the City Below the Sea. Racine, Wisc.: Whitman, 1934.
- Buck Rogers in the Dangerous Mission, With "Pop-Up" Picture. New York: Blue Ribbon Press, 1934.
- Buck Rogers on the Moons of Saturn. Racine, Wisc.: Whitman, 1934.
- Buck Rogers 25th century A.D. and the Depth Men of Jupiter. Racine, Wisc.: Whitman, 1935.
- Buck Rogers in the City of Floating Globes. Racine, Wisc.: Whitman, 1935.
- Buck Rogers 25th Century: Strange Adventures in the Spider-Ship with Three Pop-ups, Pleasure Books, Inc., Chicago, 1935.
- The Story of Buck Rogers on the Planetoid Eros. Racine, Wisc.: Whitman, 1936.
- Skyroads with Hurricane Hawk. Racine, Wisc.: Whitman, 1936.
- Skyroads with Clipper Williams of the Flying Legion. Racine, Wisc.: Whitman, 1938.
- Buck Rogers 25th century A.D. vs. the Fiend of Space. Racine, Wisc.: Whitman, 1940.
- Buck Rogers and the Super-Dwarf of Space. Racine, Wisc.: Whitman, 1943.
- Buck Rogers, 25th century A.D. Ann Arbor, Mich.: E.M. Aprill, 1971.
- The Collected Works of Buck Rogers in the 25th Century. New York: Chelsea House, 1980.
- Buck Rogers 25th century: Featuring Buddy and Allura in "Strange Adventures in the Spider Ship". Bedford, Mass.: Applewood Books, 1994.
- Buck Rogers in the 25th Century. Volume One 1929-1930: The Complete Newspaper Dailies. Neshannock, Pa.: Hermes Press, 2009.
- Buck Rogers in the 25th Century. Volume Two 1930-1932: The Complete Newspaper Dailies. Neshannock, Pa.: Hermes Press, 2009.
- Buck Rogers in the 25th Century. Volume Three 1932-1934: The Complete Newspaper Dailies. Neshannock, Pa.: Hermes Press, 2010.
