= Museum of Sonoma County =

- Old Post Office
- U.S. National Register of Historic Places
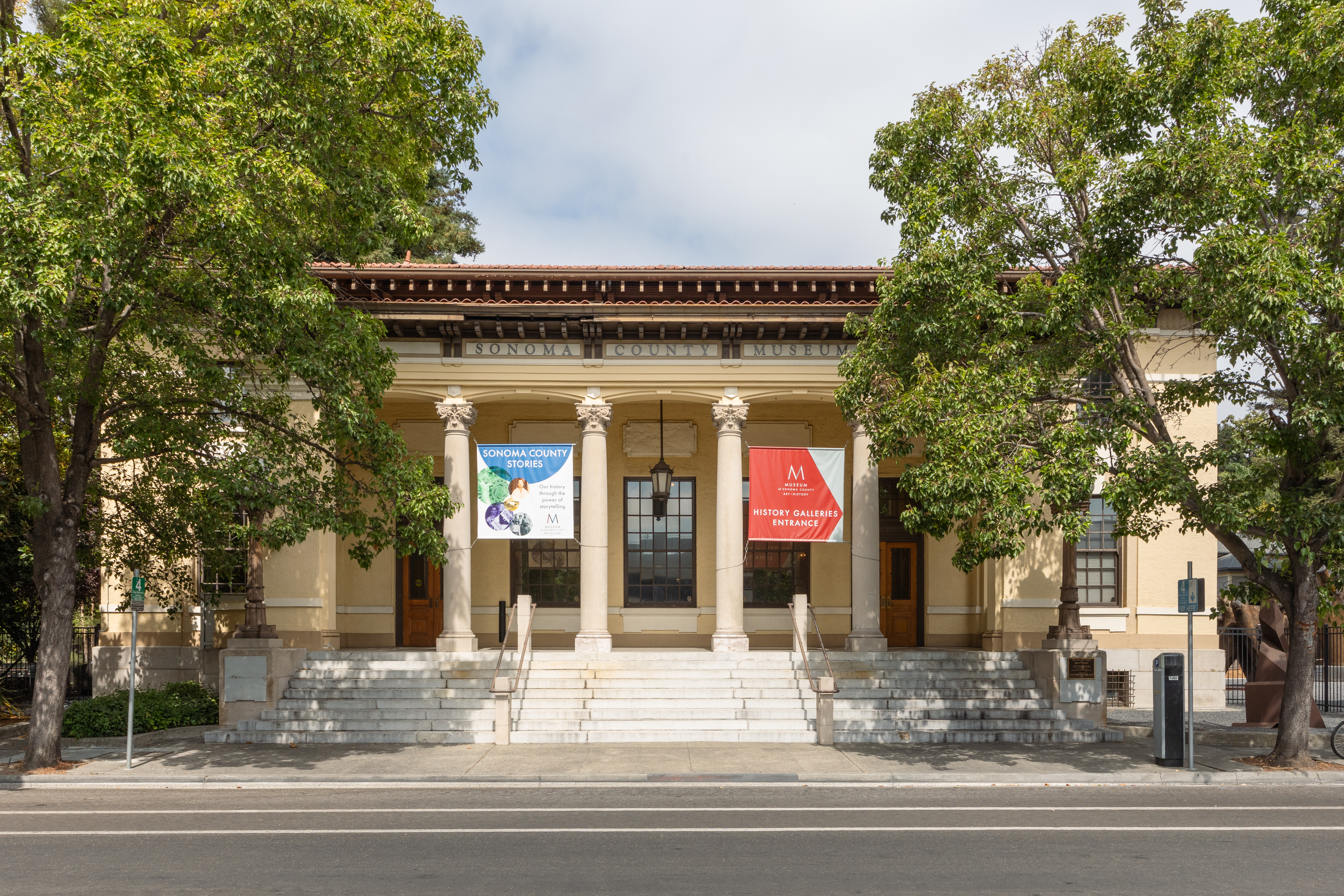
- Museum of Sonoma County

- Location within California Location within the United States
- Location: 425 7th St., Santa Rosa, California
- Coordinates: 38°26′31″N 122°43′1″W
- Area: 0.5 acres (0.2 ha)
- Built by: Mr. William K. Collier, Superintendent of Construction of Public Buildings; Hoyt Brothers (contractor)
- Architect: Office of the Supervising Architect James Knox Taylor,
- Architectural style: Roman Renaissance Revival
- NRHP reference No.: 79000559
- Added to NRHP: November 16, 1979

The Museum of Sonoma County, formerly known as the Sonoma County Museum, is a non-profit organization located in downtown Santa Rosa, California. Its 7th St. campus comprises the historic 1910 Santa Rosa Post Office, a contemporary art gallery, and a sculpture garden. Between the two buildings, the Museum presents 10-12 rotating exhibitions per year and maintains a permanent collection of over 18,000 objects that document the region's rich history and celebrate local artists. The historic post office is on the National Register of Historic Places.

== History ==
=== Santa Rosa’s Historic 1910 Post Office and Federal Building ===
Originally housed in the old adobe home on Maria Carrillo's Rancho Cabeza de Santa Rosa, the Santa Rosa Post Office was later relocated in the Atheneum Theatre building on Fifth and D Streets. It was finally slated to be given a permanent home through a bill introduced in the House of Representatives on March 8, 1906. The legislation called for “the purchase of a site and erection of a public building at Santa Rosa, California . . . a suitable building with fireproof vaults therein, for the accommodation of the post-office and other government offices . . . ” with the entire amount of funding not to exceed “the sum of one hundred thousand dollars.” A month after the legislation was introduced, the 1906 earthquake destroyed most of downtown Santa Rosa. As a result, the Santa Rosa Post Office operated temporarily out of Jenkins Grocery, surrounded by wreckage and debris.

Local hop dealer, C.C. Donovan, wrote to James Knox Taylor, Supervising Architect of Federal Buildings, asking him to give priority to the construction of the new Post Office slated for Santa Rosa. Taylor (known as the national architect) designed a structure that linked architectural design to the history, environment, and culture of the community and its surroundings. The new Santa Rosa Post Office building was an example of Classic Federal Architecture in California, a design style greatly influenced by the World's Columbian Exposition of 1893.

Construction of the new Post Office located at Fifth and A Streets began in 1908. The building process was a community effort, exemplified by determination and superior craftsmanship. The Santa Rosa-based contracting firm of Hoyt Bros. hired local firms to complete the majority of the interior and exterior work. Henry Kroncke of the Santa Rosa Planing Mills did the interior woodwork. J. C. Mailer Hardware installed the building's plumbing. Stone contractor, George Reilly, was responsible for the Bedford stone columns and marble terrazzo floors.

Technologically, the building was ahead of its time. Ray Oil Burner Company of San Francisco installed a new automatic oil burning system, which was not shown publicly in the Bay Area until the 1915 Panama Pacific Exposition in San Francisco. In addition to heating the building, the system provided hot showers for the mail carriers. On March 9, 1910, Post Master H. L. Tripp and his postal staff moved into the newly completed Santa Rosa Post Office.

=== Moving the Museum ===
The Santa Rosa Main Post Office was eventually relocated to 2nd Street and following the 1969 earthquake that ravaged much of downtown Santa Rosa, the historic post office was slated to be razed to make way for a mall. Architect Dan Peterson led the campaign to save the post office by proposing that it be moved out of the path of urban renewal. Starting in April 1979, workmen raised the great structure and lay before it a bed of rails and a network of pulleys and cables. The building moved, but almost imperceptibly — an average of 36 feet a day. The building was moved over 750 feet to its new home on 7th street, between A and B streets. Architect Dan Petersen restored it as a museum and placed the building onto the National Register of Historic Places. It reopened in 1985 as the Sonoma County Museum.

=== Sculpture Garden ===
The Sculpture Garden was designed by Frederic Warnecke, a landscape architect, son of renown architect John Carl Warnecke. It opened in the summer of 2011 and was dedicated to Evert B. and Norma Person.

=== Contemporary art, expansion, and name change ===
In 2001, Tom Golden of Freestone donated his collection of some 125 drawings, sculptures, collages and photographs by world-famous conceptual artists Christo and Jeanne-Claude, remembered in Sonoma and Marin counties for their ‘70s project “Running Fence,” with white nylon fabric stretching more than 20 miles cross-country to Bodega Bay. In 2005, the Museum of Contemporary Art (MOCA) merged with the Sonoma County Museum, when that organization scrapped plans for a $5.5 million facility at the Luther Burbank Center for the Arts. In 2015, the Museum expanded east into the remodeled back half of former Conklin Brothers flooring company warehouse at Seventh and B streets. The expansion came with a rebranding and the Sonoma County Museum was reborn as twins, with one museum for art (Art Museum of Sonoma County) and one for history (History Museum of Sonoma County), under the parent organization of the Museums of Sonoma County.

In 2018, the museum underwent a final name change to Museum of Sonoma County. The change from plural to singular reflects the Museum’s vision of being recognized as one organization with two buildings, multiple galleries, and a sculpture garden on its Seventh Street campus, rather than two separate entities (“Art Museum of Sonoma County” and “History Museum of Sonoma County”) under the umbrella of a parent organization ("Museums of Sonoma County"). “With our new name change, the Museum aims to bring art and history in alignment to allow for a more synergistic relationship between the two,” said Jeff Nathanson, then executive director. “We are reimagining the Museum as a major cultural destination for the region, with a wide range of art and history programs for people of all ages and backgrounds.”

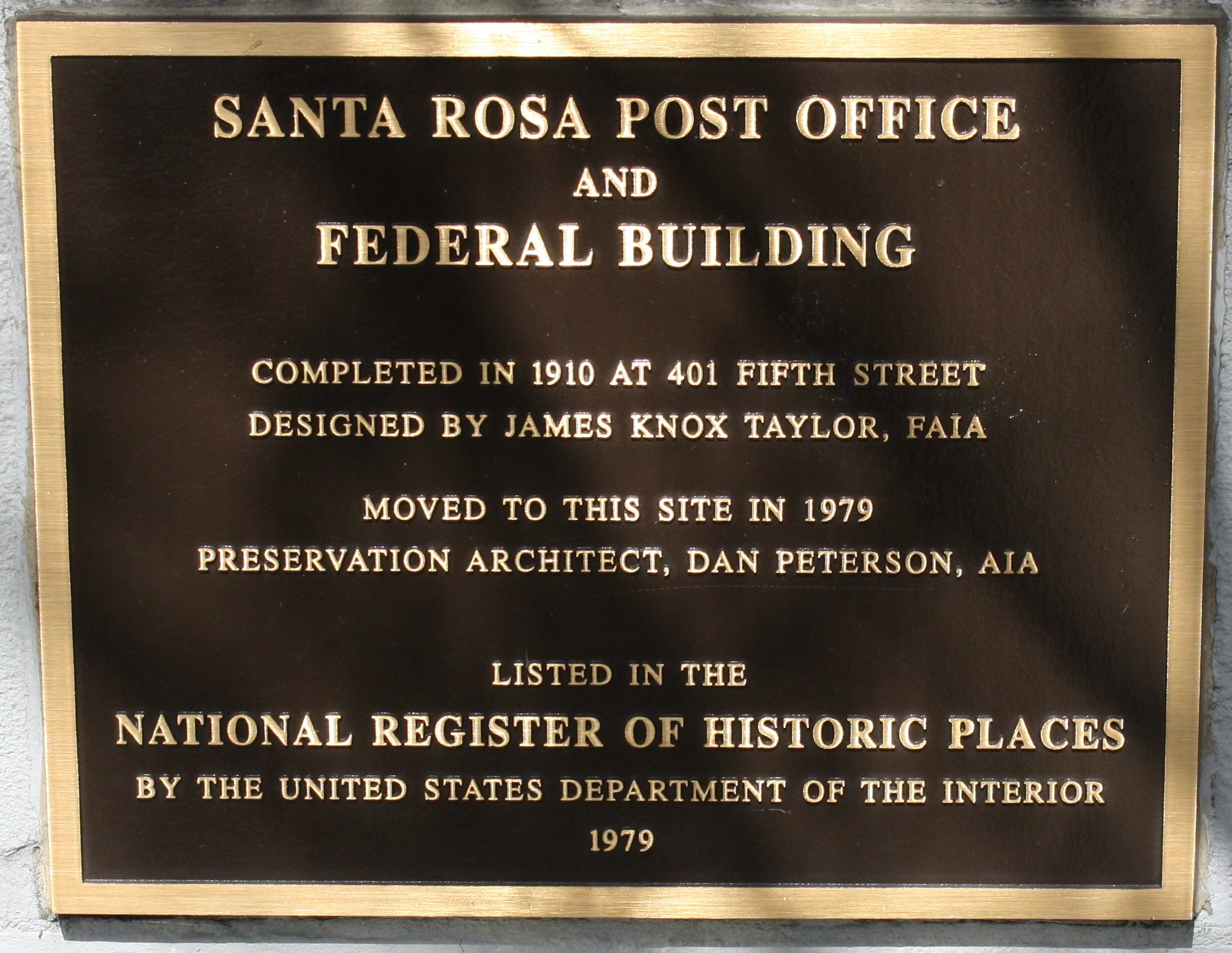
Historic Santa Rosa Post Office

== Collection ==
The museum maintains a permanent collection of over 18,000 objects that document the region's rich history and celebrate artists who have lived or worked in the North Bay. It includes extensive collections of historic paintings, sculpture, photographs, prints, costumes, textiles, ceramics, glass, industrial tools, machinery, wood sculpture, furniture, objects, documents, and graphics relative to the local communities, commerce, technologies, and lifestyles. Notable collections include:

- Tom Golden's Christo and Jeanne-Claude collection, which the museum offers as a traveling exhibition. It includes 125 drawings, sculptures, collages, and photographs by world-famous conceptual artists Christo and Jeanne-Claude, remembered in Sonoma and Marin counties for their ‘70s project “Running Fence,”
- Marguerite Wildenhain ceramics
- Carroll Barnes sculptures
- 19th century California landscapes by artists such as Thomas Hill, Frederick Farina Schafer, and Frederick Butman
- Objects and artifacts related to the utopian community of Fountaingrove, Thomas Lake Harris, and Kanaye Nagasawa
- Song Wong Bourbeau (1909-1996), a third-generation Santa Rosan, was known throughout Santa Rosa not only as an astute businesswoman, but for her tireless dedication as a community activist and philanthropist. Over two hundred photographs and artifacts make up this extensive collection, representing the rich and significant history and culture of Santa Rosa's Chinatown and Chinese community.

== See also ==
- List of United States post offices
