= National Newspaper Syndicate =

American syndication service

- Formerly: John F. Dille Co. (1917–1957); National Newspaper Service
- Industry: Print syndication
- Founded: 1917; 109 years ago
- Founder: John F. Dille
- Defunct: 1984; 42 years ago
- Headquarters: 326 West Madison Street, Chicago, Illinois, U.S.
- Key people: Robert C. Dille
- Products: Comic strips, newspaper columns, editorial cartoons
- Owners: John F. Dille (1917–1957); Robert C. Dille (1957–1983)

The National Newspaper Syndicate, originally known as the John F. Dille Co. (/ˈdɪli/), was a syndication service that operated from 1917 to 1984. It was founded by Chicago businessman John F. Dille and specialized in comic strips and gag cartoons. It also carried advice columns, such as Paul Popenoe's "Modern Marriage". It is most well known for syndicating Buck Rogers, considered by many to be the first adventure comic strip.

== History ==
John Flint Dille (1884–1957) launched John Dille's National Newspaper Service in early 1917; later renaming it the "John F. Dille Co." syndicate. The Dille syndicate's first successful strip was Richard A. "Dick" Clarke's Moving Picture Funnies, which debuted in February 1917 and ran until 1946.

In 1922, the Dille syndicate absorbed the Uncle Ray Syndicate, founded by Ramon Coffman, and based in Milwaukee, Wisconsin, mostly in order to syndicate Coffman's column Child's Story of the Human Race.

H. F. Voorhees launched a number of strips with the syndicate in the period 1924–1926, but none of them caught on.

Dille launched Buck Rogers in the 25th Century A.D. on January 7, 1929; internationally popular for many decades, it ran continuously until July 8, 1967. The stripe was created by Philip Nowlan and illustrated by Dick Calkins. (John F. Dille himself ghost-wrote the Buck Rogers strip from October 1949 to January 1951, working with artist Leonard Dworkins.)

Buck Rogers artist Dick Calkins' own strip, Skyroads also launched in 1929, running until 1942.

Walt Ditzen's Fan Fare was launched in 1947, running until 1961, when it changed titles to Fun Fare, running until 1973.

Cartoonist Dave Gerard began a 35-year relationship with the Dille syndicate in 1949 with his strip Viewpoint, which ran until 1953. That was succeeded by the popular strip Will-Yum, which ran from 1953 to 1966. Gerard's City Hall strip ran from 1967 to 1984.

The Dille syndicate launched Brad Anderson's Marmaduke in 1954, carrying the panel until 1975; in 1976, it moved to United Feature Syndicate. At some point in the mid-1950s, the syndicate was renamed the "National Newspaper Syndicate".

John F. Dille died in 1957, succeeded as general manager of the syndicate by his son Robert Crabtree Dille.

Popular National Newspaper strips from the 1960s included Win Mortimer's Larry Brannon, Elizabeth Brozowska's Geraldine, Bill Lignante's Let's Explore Your Mind (1962–1971), and Woody's World (1963–1979), originally by John Holm.

In 1968 the syndicate was offering about 35 features to about 650 client newspapers.

Robert Dille died in 1983, and the syndicate faded away by 1984. Robert's son, Flint Dille, is an accomplished screenwriter, game designer and novelist. He is part of the Dille Family Trust, which owned the rights to the Buck Rogers character.

== Advice columns ==
The Syndicate ran one of the earliest marriage advice columns. Written by Paul Popenoe, it ran from 1947 to 1972. At first called "Modern Marriage", its name was changed to "Your Family and You" in 1958.

== Strips and panels ==
- Abe Martin Junior by E. B. Sullivan (1938-1939) — apparently replaced the Abe Martin strip for these two years
- Abe Martin of Brown County by Kin Hubbard (c. 1917–1930) — strip began in The Indianapolis News in 1904
- Adam Apple's Adventures by Don Herold (1932) — daily panel
- Amazing But True by Albert Edward Wiggam (1931-1932) — daily panel
- Applesauce by Dick Calkins (1924) — daily panel
- The Bag Line by H. F. Voorhees (1925) — weekly panel
- Buck Rogers in the 25th Century A.D. originally by Dick Calkins (January 7, 1929–July 8, 1967)
- City Hall by Dave Gerard (1967–1984)
- Codgie by H. F. Voorhees (1924)
- Deb's Diary by Earl Reeder (1928)
- Do It Yourself by Morrie Brickman (1950s) — later continued under the title Crosscut from 1957 to 1962
- Famous Fighters by John Wentworth (1932)
- Fan Fare by Walt Ditzen (1947-1961) — later continued under the title Fun Fare from 1961 to 1973
- Flying Legion by William Winston (1939-1942)
- Gargoyle and Gadget by E. B. Sullivan (1936–1945)
- Geraldine by Elizabeth Brozowska (1961–1968) — originated in Denmark in 1958 under the title Josephine
- Horse Shoe Sam by C. E. Bidinger (1928)
- Jezabelle Jones by Ira Yarbrough (1952)
- Larry Brannon by Win Mortimer (1961-1968)
- Let's Explore Your Mind by Bill Lignante (1962–1971)
- Marmaduke by Brad Anderson (1954–c. 1970) — strip moved to United Feature Syndicate, where it continues today
- Mimi by Mary Dorman (1974)
- Mr. Sandman by Frank Vydra (1970)
- Moving Picture Funnies by Richard A. "Dick" Clarke (February 27, 1917–1946)
- One Up by Lew Saw (1963–1966)
- Pa and Ma by H. F. Voorhees (1926)
- Pat the Paris Shopper by Joan Carson (1932–1935)
- Playmates by Lloyd Jones & H. F. Voorhees (1924–1925)
- Skyroads originally by Lester J. Maitland and Dick Calkins (1929–1942) — known as Clipper Williams on Courage Island from 1937 to 1938
- Speed Spaulding by Edwin Balmer & Philip Wylie and Marvin Bradley (January 8 1940–March 29, 1941)
- Talullah by Ira Yarbrough (1950–1953)
- Thornsby by Fred McLaren (cartoonist) (1972-1975)
- Viewpoint by Dave Gerard (1949-1953)
- Will-Yum by Dave Gerard (1953–1966)
- Woody's World (1963–1979) by John Holm (1963-1975) and Bill Potter (1976–1979)
