= Marmaduke (2010 film) =

2010 film by Tom Dey

- Theatrical release poster
- Directed by: Tom Dey
- Written by: Tim Rasmussen; Vince Di Meglio
- Based on: Marmaduke by: Brad Anderson; Phil Leeming
- Produced by: John Davis
- Starring: Owen Wilson; Lee Pace; Judy Greer; William H. Macy; Steve Coogan; Sam Elliott; Fergie; George Lopez; Christopher Mintz-Plasse; Emma Stone; Kiefer Sutherland; Marlon Wayans
- Cinematography: Greg Gardiner
- Edited by: Don Zimmerman
- Music by: Christopher Lennertz
- Production companies: Regency Enterprises; Davis Entertainment; Dune Entertainment
- Distributed by: 20th Century Fox
- Release date: June 4, 2010 (United States)
- Running time: 88 minutes
- Country: United States
- Language: English
- Budget: $50 million
- Box office: $89.9 million

Marmaduke is a 2010 American comedy film based on Brad Anderson's comic strip of the same name. The film was directed by Tom Dey and stars an ensemble cast consisting of Owen Wilson (as the title character), Lee Pace, Judy Greer, William H. Macy, Steve Coogan, Sam Elliott, Fergie, George Lopez, Christopher Mintz-Plasse, Emma Stone, Kiefer Sutherland, and Marlon Wayans. It centers on a Great Dane named Marmaduke (voiced by Wilson) who moves with his family from Kansas to Orange County and faces challenges to fit in with other dogs. The film was released in the United States on June 4, 2010, by 20th Century Fox. It was panned by critics, but it grossed $89.9 million worldwide against a production budget of $50 million. An animated adaptation was released in 2022, which ultimately received worse critical reception.

== Plot ==
Marmaduke is a Great Dane, living in rural Kansas with his friend Carlos, a Balinese cat. Their owner Phil Winslow works as a marketing director for Bark Organics, a dog food company. Phil is very strict with Marmaduke; he and his wife Debbie have three children: Barbara, Brian, and Sarah.

One day, Carlos tells Marmaduke that he overheard Phil saying that they were being moved to Orange County, California. In their new location, Phil must meet his new boss at the dog park. The boss has a beautiful Rough Collie called Jezebel and Marmaduke takes a shine to her. Marmaduke also meets an Australian Shepherd named Mazie who introduces him to her crew: a nervous Chinese Crested called Giuseppe, and a knowledgeable Dachshund named Raisin. They in turn introduce him to the snobbish group in the park. This includes Bosco, a tough and callous Beauceron who had two Miniature Pinscher minions named Thunder and Lightning. Bosco tells Marmaduke to stay away from Jezebel who is his girlfriend. Later that night, Marmaduke and the mutts get together at night and crash Bosco's pedigrees-only party, only to be scared away. Marmaduke asks Mazie to help him get a girl, whom she presumes is herself but is Jezebel.

Marmaduke has Carlos pretend to be lost in the dog park, and the two stage a fight in front of all the dogs to boost Marmaduke's popularity. Marmaduke enters a dog surfing contest put together as a promotional stunt by Phil to sway Petco and beats Bosco, who is the reigning dog-surfing champion. They get into a fight, appalling the Petco executives in the process. As a result, Phil hires a dog trainer named Anton to help him control Marmaduke, albeit with little success.

Marmaduke takes Jezebel on Mazie's dream date, which the latter watches from afar. While the Winslow family are on Don's boat, Marmaduke throws a party; most residents of the dog park attend, save for Mazie, Giuseppe, and Raisin. Bosco crashes the party after discovering that Carlos lives with Marmaduke and the Winslows. He exposes Marmaduke, whose friends betray him. When the Winslows return and Phil discovers the house in a wreck, he locks Marmaduke outside. Marmaduke runs away and leaves Mazie a toy she had given him earlier. Mazie goes to Marmaduke's house, and Carlos tells her that he left the house. As she looks for him, Marmaduke meets Chupadogra, an elderly English Mastiff who is feared for presumably eating his owner. In reality, he ran away to lead a pack, but they abandoned him. He has spent the time alone in the woods with nothing but a blanket and his old water bowl, which reads "Buster". Buster tells Marmaduke to return to his family while he still has one and distracts a dog catcher. Marmaduke leaves but gets lost.

The next morning, the family discover that Marmaduke is missing and begin searching for him. Mazie and the family find him at the same time on the streets, but Mazie falls into the subterranean rainwater conduit after the street below her collapses. Marmaduke jumps in after her and Phil tries to retrieve him, as well as the fire department. The fireman saves Mazie but loses Marmaduke in the raging water. By this time, Phil has been fired for missing the meeting for the last chance with Petco. He then runs to the aqueduct that the conduits lead to and finds Marmaduke in the raging waters. He begs Marmaduke to let go of the branch he's holding onto and let the waters carry him to Phil. He reluctantly does, and is saved. Several kids record it on video and put it on YouTube. Since it generates almost 700,000 hits, Phil is rehired. Phil then talks about moving back to Arkansas, but the entire family wants to stay in California. Marmaduke later confronts the pedigrees, saying that differences shouldn't matter, that they're all dogs and should have an equal share of the park. Everyone agrees and turn on Bosco, who leaves, after revealing his fear of bees, which Marmaduke is also afraid of. Meanwhile, the YouTube video also wins the company the Petco deal. Phil and Don begin thinking of new commercials when they ask each other about if the dogs could talk to each other, or even dance.

The finale then shows Marmaduke, Carlos, Jezebel, Mazie, Giuseppe, Raisin, Thunder, Lightning, and Buster, among others, dancing and singing "What I Like About You", which turns out to be the commercial. In the end, Marmaduke and Mazie are dating, Marmaduke and Jezebel are friends and all is well. Marmaduke then passes gas in the bed as he winks at the camera.

== Cast ==
=== Live-action cast ===
- Lee Pace as Phil Winslow, Marmaduke's owner
- Judy Greer as Debra "Debbie" Winslow, Phil's wife
- William H. Macy as Don Twombly, Phil's boss
- David Walliams as Anton Harrison, the master of the Top Dog Methods
- Caroline Sunshine as Barbara Winslow, Phil and Debbie's teenage daughter
- Finley Jacobsen as Brian Winslow, Phil and Debbie's son
- Mandy and Milana Haines as Sarah Winslow, Phil and Debbie's infant daughter
- Raugi Yu as a drama trainer
- Frank Topol as Bosco's owner

=== Voice cast ===
- Owen Wilson as Marmaduke, a Great Dane
- Emma Stone as Mazie, an energetic Australian Shepherd
- George Lopez as Carlos, a Spanish-accented Balinese cat
- Christopher Mintz-Plasse as Giuseppe, a stylized Chinese Crested Dog
- Steve Coogan as Raisin, a British-accented Dachshund
- Fergie as Jezebel, a Rough Collie
- Kiefer Sutherland as Bosco, a Beauceron, who is the alpha of the Pedigrees
- Damon Wayans Jr. as Thunder, a Miniature Pinscher, and Lightning's twin brother
- Marlon Wayans as Lightning, a Miniature Pinscher, and Thunder's twin brother
- Sam Elliott as Chupadogra (Buster), an elderly English Mastiff

== Soundtrack ==
Marmaduke (Original Motion Picture Soundtrack)

Soundtrack album by Christopher Lennertz
- Released: January 1, 2010
- Recorded: 2009
- Studios: The Newman Stage, 20th Century Fox; Eastwood Scoring Stage, Warner Bros. Studios; The Village Recorder
- Genre: Film score
- Length: 52:21
- Label: Varèse Sarabande

The score for Marmaduke was composed and conducted by Christopher Lennertz. The album was released by Varèse Sarabande on January 1, 2010.

== Release ==
Marmaduke was released in the United States on June 4, 2010, by 20th Century Fox. This film was released on the same day as Get Him to the Greek and Killers. It was released on DVD and Blu-ray on August 31, 2010, by 20th Century Fox Home Entertainment.

== Reception ==
=== Box office ===
Marmaduke grossed $33.7 million in the United States and $56.3 million in other territories for a worldwide total of $89.9 million against a production budget of $50 million.

The film earned $3.4 million on its opening day, and debuted to $11.6 million from 3,213 theaters in its opening weekend, finishing sixth behind Shrek Forever After, Get Him to the Greek, Killers, Prince of Persia: Sands of Time, and Sex and the City 2. In its second weekend, it grossed $6 million (dropping 48%), finishing in seventh.

=== Critical response ===
On the review aggregator website Rotten Tomatoes, 9% of 99 reviews are positive, with an average rating of 3.4/10. The website's critical consensus reads, "Dull and unfunny, Marmaduke offers family filmgoers little more than another round of talking animals and scatological humor." On Metacritic, the film has a score of 30 out of 100 based on 22 critics, indicating "generally unfavorable reviews". Audiences polled by CinemaScore gave the film an average grade of "B+" on an A+ to F scale.

Roger Ebert of the Chicago Sun-Times gave the film two out of four stars, and wrote in his review, "The moment I saw Marmaduke's big drooling lips moving, I knew I was in trouble." The Radio Times was quite positive, saying "it's all a tad contrived, but young and old alike will get something from it—even if the lip movements take a bit of getting used to."

=== Accolades ===
Marmaduke was nominated at the Teen Choice Awards for Choice Movie: Animated. George Lopez was nominated for a Razzie Award for Worst Supporting Actor for his roles in Marmaduke, among others.

== Animated film ==
It was announced on the Andrews McMeel website that an animated spin-off of Marmaduke was planned to be released in 2020. The film features Pete Davidson as Marmaduke, J.K. Simmons as Zeus, and David Koechner as Phil Winslow. However, instead of releasing by 20th Century Fox under the 20th Century Fox Animation label, the animation was provided by One Cool Animation and the film was released on Netflix on May 6, 2022, and in theatres internationally on May 27, 2022, alongside Top Gun: Maverick and The Bob's Burgers Movie. The film received even worse reviews than the 2010 film.
