= Sameshima Naonobu =

Japanese diplomat

- 鮫島尚信
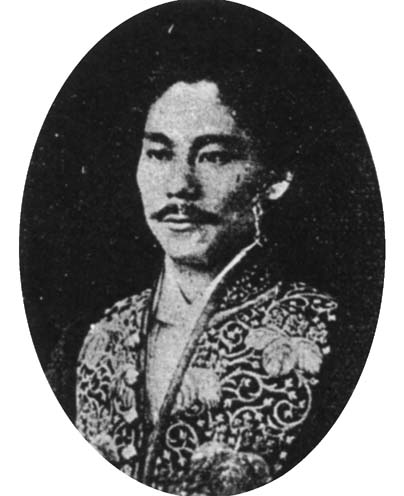
- Born: April 16, 1845; Satsuma Province, Japan
- Died: December 4, 1880; Paris, France
- Occupation: Diplomat

Sameshima Naonobu (鮫島 尚信, Sameshima Naonobu, April 16, 1845 – December 4, 1880) was a Japanese diplomat. He was Japan's first resident minister in Europe.

== Early life and education ==
Sameshima was born on April 16, 1845, in Satsuma Province, Japan. He was the son of a physician and had two siblings. He went to study in Nagasaki in 1861, where he learned Western medicine and English. In 1865 he studied abroad in London with 15 other students from Satsuma, including Mori Arinori, Nagasawa Kanaye, Yoshida Kiyonari, and Godai Tomoatsu. He went to the United States with 5 other Satsuma students to live at a vineyard in Brocton, New York, with Thomas Lake Harris, but returned to Japan with Mori in 1868.

== Career ==
Sameshima worked for the Japanese government when he returned. When the Ministry of Foreign Affairs was founded, he was appointed a junior minister. He became the first resident minister from Japan in Europe in 1870, assisted by Shioda Saburo and Frederic Marshall, an English lawyer and journalist. Harry Parkes objected to his appointment because of his inexperience and the size of his portfolio, which was made up of Britain, France, and Prussia. Sameshima's credentials as a charge d'affairs was not initially accepted in the United Kingdom, though it was in Prussia and France. He spent most of his time in Paris, and was awarded the Légion d'honneur in 1874.

During his tenure as a diplomat, Sameshima wrote the "Diplomatic Guide" with Marshall. It was a manual for staff at the Ministry of Foreign Affairs. He also called for the professionalization and improvement of Japanese diplomacy.

In April 1875, Sameshima briefly returned to Japan to help Terashima Munenori with administrative reforms, but returned to France in 1878. His job duties expanded to include Spain and Portugal in 1880, but he died later that year in Paris on December 4.
