= Manzella =

Manzella is a surname. Notable people with the surname Manzella include:

- Cesare Manzella (1897–1963), Italian mobster
- Darren Manzella (1977–2013), American military personnel and LGBT activist
- Theresa Manzella, American politician
- Tommy Manzella (born 1983), American baseball player
