= Arai Ōsui =

Arai Ōsui (新井奥邃) (1846–1922) was a prominent Japanese disciple of the 19th century cult leader, Thomas Lake Harris. He was originally a samurai in the service of one of the northern clans who fought in the Boshin War. He saw service before and during the Tokugawa shogunate's final battle at Hakodate.

== Life ==
Remaining on the northern island of Ezo (modern day Hokkaido) after the battle, he initially converted to Russian Orthodox Christianity, but became disillusioned. After a meeting with Mori Arinori, he went to the USA to join Harris' Brotherhood of the New Life Brockton community in March 1871. There he was well treated by Harris who asked Nagasawa Kanaye, his prominent disciple and anointed successor, to look after him. Having settled into Brocton, Arai went with Harris and Nagasawa to help found the Fountaingrove community in Santa Rosa, Sonoma County, California in 1875.

Arai's main duties at Fountaingrove appear to have been to run the printing press; Harris wrote prolifically. He also engaged in agricultural activities under Nagasawa who was by now on the way to being an internationally known wine master. In 1899, for reasons which remain obscure, he returned to Japan with only the clothes on his back. In Tokyo he founded a small community of his own, "The House of Humility and Harmony". There he taught a mixture of Harris’ and his own teachings.

He lived a quiet life of reflection in Tokyo, promoting among other things the place of women in society and publishing several pamphlets, such as Inward Prayer and Fragments and newsletters. Some remained unpublished until after his death. He appears to have disdained paid work and lived off minuscule donations from followers and admirers. He died in poverty in 1922.
