= Sameshima =

Sameshima (鮫島, lit. "shark island") is a Japanese surname. Notable people with the surname include:

- Aya Sameshima (鮫島 彩, born 1987), Japanese footballer
- Kota Sameshima (鮫島 晃太, born 1992), Japanese footballer
- Sameshima Naonobu (鮫島 尚信, 1845–1880), Japanese diplomat
