= Naonobu =

Naonobu (written: 直円 or 尚信) is a masculine Japanese given name. Notable people with the name include:

- Ajima Naonobu (安島 直円, 1732–1798), Japanese mathematician
- Kanō Naonobu (狩野 尚信, 1607–1650), Japanese painter
- Sameshima Naonobu (鮫島 尚信, 1845–1880), Japanese diplomat
- Naonobu Fujii (藤井 直伸, born 1992), Japanese volleyball player

== See also ==
- Naonobu (crater), a lunar impact crater
