= Darren Manzella =

American activist

- Born: August 8, 1977
- Died: August 29, 2013 (aged 36); Pittsford, New York, US
- Occupations: Medical Liaison, United States Army
- Known for: Openly gay in the United States Army despite DADT policy
- Spouse: Javier Lapeira (m. 2013)

Darren Manzella (August 8, 1977 – August 29, 2013) was a United States Army Sergeant, Army medic and gay activist from Portland, New York, who was discharged under the Don't ask, don't tell policy. Manzella served in Iraq and Kuwait, and was stationed in Fort Hood, Texas.

== Early life ==
Manzella grew up on his parents' grape farm in Portland, Chautauqua County, New York, where he attended Brocton Central School.

== Activism ==
Manzella came out to his commander after rumors of his sexuality surfaced in the form of threats to "turn the flame down." Manzella had at that point told his unit that he was gay and had introduced them to his boyfriend, A.J.

No action was taken against Manzella due to the army's finding no evidence of his homosexuality in its investigation, which included a video provided by Manzella displaying passionate kissing between him and his boyfriend. The investigation concluded that he should return to work and he was told, "You're not gay" and that "proof of homosexuality" had not been found.

== Commendations ==
During his service, he earned the Combat Medical Badge.

== 60 Minutes and discharge ==
Manzella came out on American news program 60 Minutes in 2007, the first openly gay service member on active duty to speak to the press from a war zone. His decision to appear on the show resulted from his opposition to the Don't ask, don't tell policy and his desire to build momentum for ending it. He believed that gays and lesbians should be able to serve openly. He said that due to the 60 Minutes interview he would likely be discharged. He was placed on block leave. He worked with the Servicemembers Legal Defense Network (SLDN), a gay military organization and lobby group.

Manzella was discharged with full benefits in June 2008 for acknowledging that he was gay. The DADT policy was repealed in 2011.

Immediately following the repeal of DADT, Manzella enlisted into the New York Army National Guard and was promoted and awarded for his meritorious service.

In August 2011, Manzella returned to Rochester and began working as a health science specialist for the Department of Veterans Affairs.

He joined the reserves shortly before his death in 2013.

== Personal life and death ==
Manzella married Javier Lapeira in Rochester on July 5, 2013. On August 29, 2013, Manzella was killed when the driver of an SUV hit him as he was in the act of pushing his disabled vehicle off the road in Pittsford, Monroe County, New York.

== See also ==
- Sexual orientation and the United States military
