= Yoshida Kiyonari =

Japanese samurai and diplomat

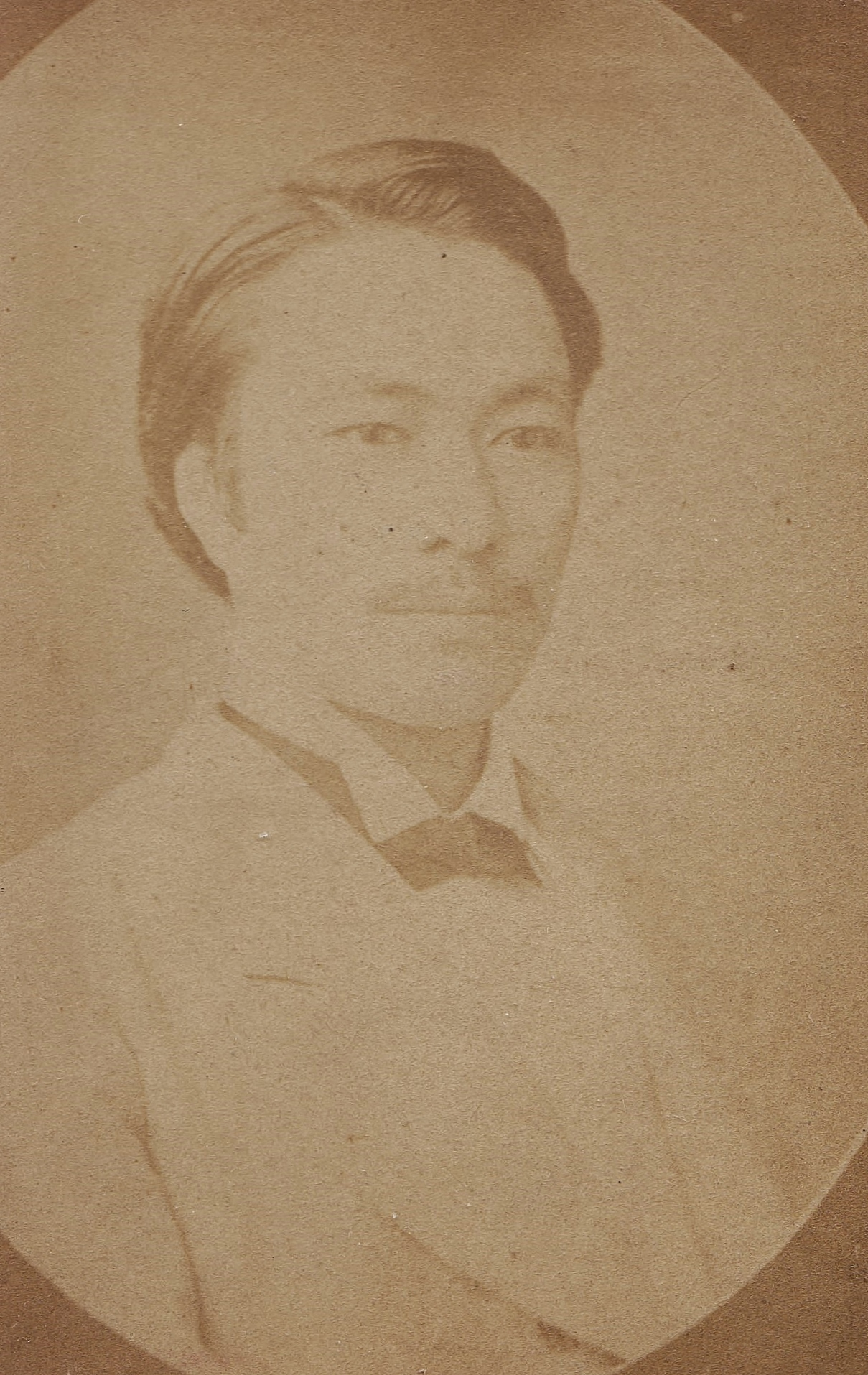
Yoshida Kiyonari

Yoshida Kiyonari (Japanese: 吉田 清成; died 3 August 1891) was a Japanese samurai and diplomatic envoy to the United States.

== Early life and education ==
In 1865, Yoshida was sent with Sameshima Naonobu and seventeen other samurai from Satsuma Domain to England to study Western science and technology. During 1867, Yoshida and Sameshima travelled with two others to the United States and joined the Brotherhood of the New Life, Thomas Lake Harris's Christian spiritual group. When they returned to England later that year, they claimed to have felt the presence of God through Harris' preaching in New York.

Yoshida studied at University College London. He enrolled at New Jersey's Rutgers College in September 1868, but left after a few months. The following July, he registered at Wilbraham Academy (now Monson Academy) in Massachusetts and studied political economy.

After graduating, he spent time in New York and Hartford, where he gained experience in banking.

== Career ==
He returned to Japan in 1870, and joined the Finance Ministry. He quickly became deputy junior minister, then head of the Tax Bureau, and finally deputy Vice Minister by November 1871. While working there, he secured a loan for Japan from the United States and Europe in 1871.

He transferred to the Foreign Ministry, and in January 1874 he was appointed "extraordinary envoy and plenipotentiary minister" to the United States. In 1879, he arranged the visit of Ulysses S. Grant and his wife Julia Grant to Japan, and secured the return of funds from the United States Congress. He stayed in the position of envoy until 1882.

In July 1884, he became Vice Minister of Foreign Affairs, but fell out with Minister Inoue Kaoru. He was made Vice Minister of Agriculture and Commerce in September 1885.

He was made an honorary member of the Genrōin in 1887, and awarded the title of viscount.

== Personal life ==
He became friends with the historian Henry Adams, with whom he shared an interest in archaic law.

He died after a period of illness of 3 August 1891.

Diplomatic posts
Preceded by Jirō Yano	Japanese Ambassador to the United States; January 1874 – 1882	Succeeded by Munenori Terashima
