= Brocton Arch =

- U.S. National Register of Historic Places
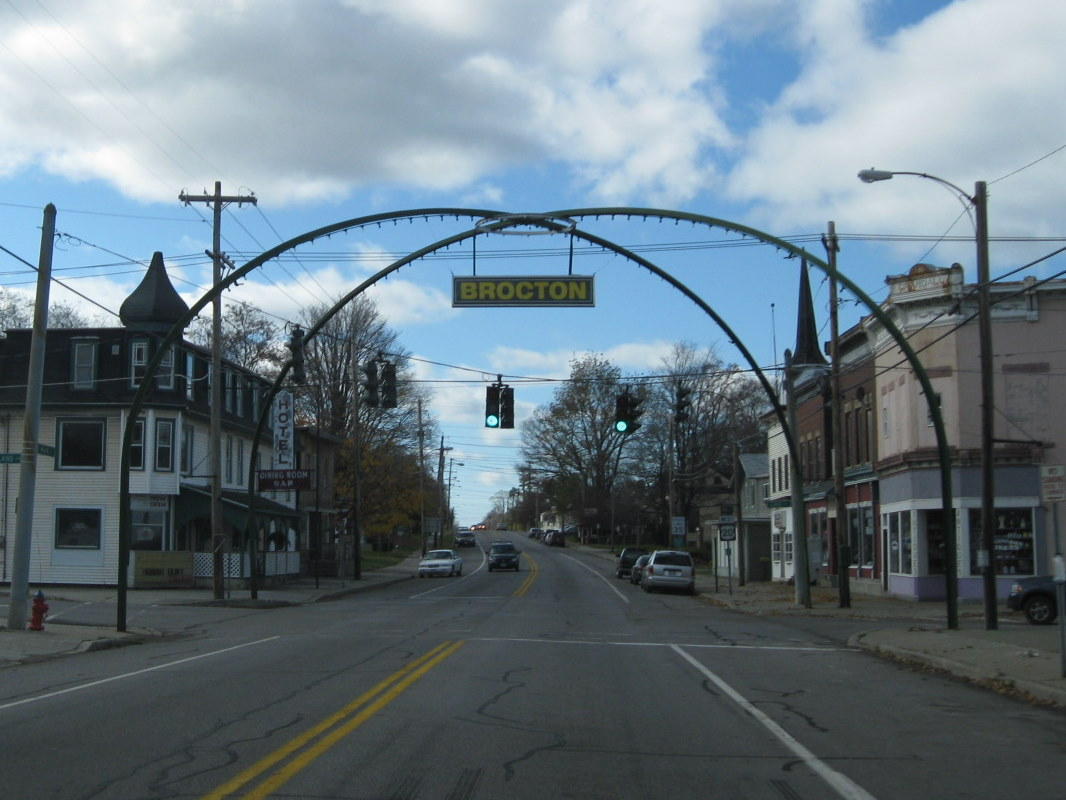
- Brocton Arch, November 2009

- Location within New York Location within the United States
- Location: Jct. of Main St. (U.S. Route 20) with Lake and Highland Aves., Brocton, New York
- Coordinates: 42°23′19″N 79°26′28″W
- Built: 1913
- Architect: Phoenix Bridge Co.; Farnham Machine and Foundry Co.
- NRHP reference No.: 96000133
- Added to NRHP: February 22, 1996

Brocton Arch is a historic "welcome arch" located at Brocton in Chautauqua County, New York. It is a freestanding steel arch bearing the community's name constructed in 1913 over a public thoroughfare. It is a rare double span, four way street arch.

It was listed on the National Register of Historic Places in 1996.

Beginning in 2012, the Arch was taken down for refurbishing. The Arch was put back up about a year later.
