= Walt Ditzen =

American cartoonist

- Born: Walter Louis Ditzen; August 8, 1913 Davenport, Iowa, U.S.
- Died: March 4, 1973 (aged 59) Scottsdale, Arizona, U.S.
- Area: Cartoonist
- Notable works: Fan Fare

Walter Louis Ditzen (August 8, 1913 – March 4, 1973) was an American cartoonist. Ditzen drew the Fan Fare cartoon strip. Fan Fare was launched in 1947 (syndicated by the John F. Dille Co.) running until 1961, when it changed title to Fun Fare, running until 1973.

Ditzen helped and advised Charles Schulz on the early samples of Charlie Brown.

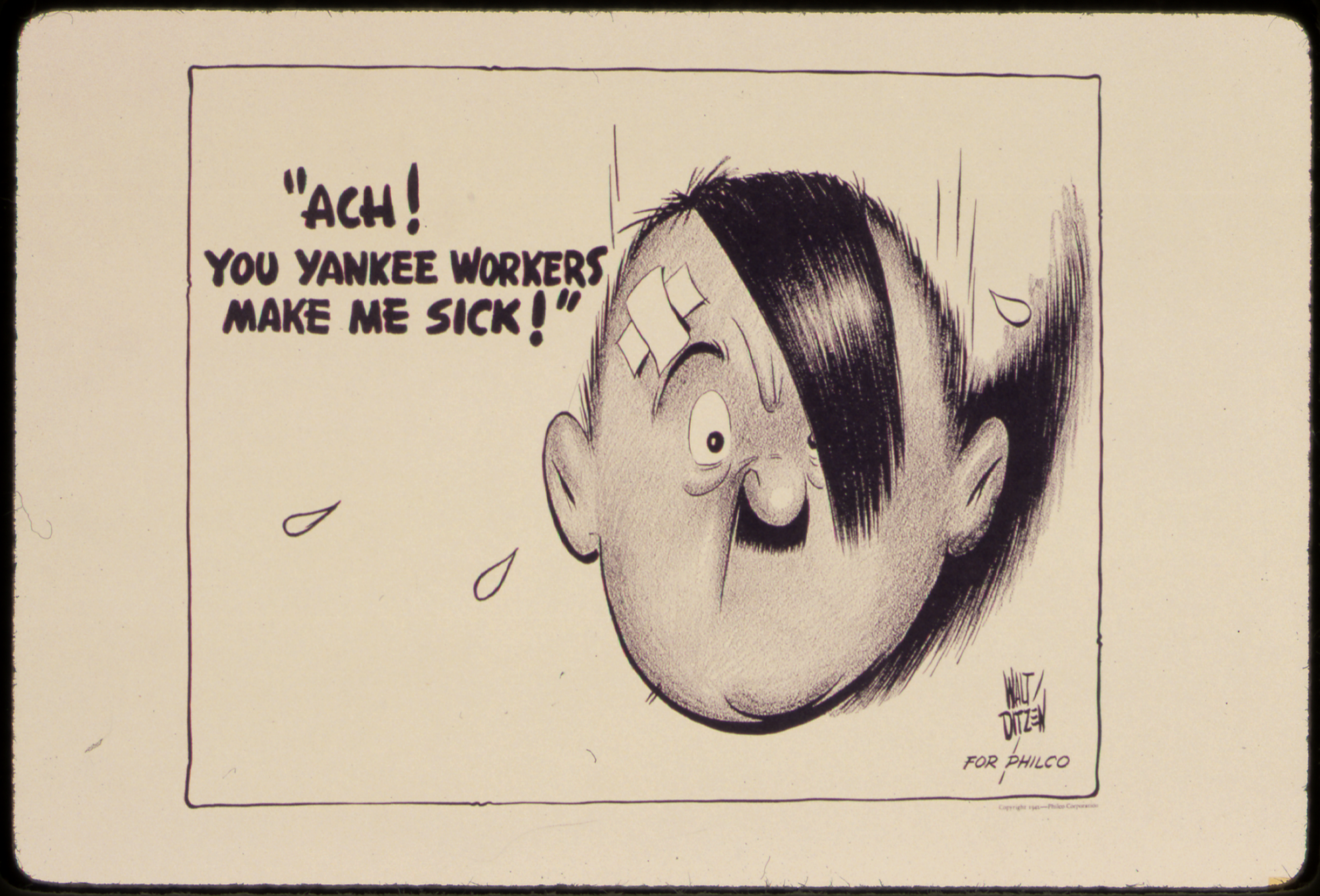
Anti-axis World War II art by Ditzen
