= Skyroads (comics) =

American comic strip (1929–1942)

- Skyroads Better Little Book
- Author(s): Lester J. Maitland (1929–1930); Dick Calkins (1930-1935)
- Illustrator(s): Dick Calkins (1929–1930); Zack Mosley (1930-1932); Russell Keaton (1932–1939) "Leon Gordon" (Leonard Dworkins) (1939–1942)
- Current status/schedule: Concluded Daily strip
- Launch date: May 20, 1929
- End date: 1942
- Alternate name: Clipper Williams on Courage Island (1937–1938)
- Syndicate(s): John F. Dille Co.
- Publisher: Whitman Publishing Company
- Genre: aviation

Skyroads, a serialized aviation-based comic strip, was published from May 20, 1929, to 1942.

After Charles Lindbergh's crossing of the Atlantic Ocean, aviation became the focus of several comic strips. Tailspin Tommy (debuting in 1928) was the first, but it was soon followed by others, including Skyroads.

Skyroads was created by aviation pioneer Lester J. Maitland and Lt. Dick Calkins, an ex-Army Air Service pilot who was already drawing the Buck Rogers comic strip. Like Buck Rogers, it was syndicated by the John F. Dille Co. (later known as the National Newspaper Syndicate). Maitland and Calkins continued to collaborate on Skyroads until 1933, when Calkins' assistant, Russell Keaton, took over the writing and artwork. Keaton remained until 1939, when it was taken over by Leonard Dworkins (using the pseudonym "Leon Gordon").

== Characters and story ==
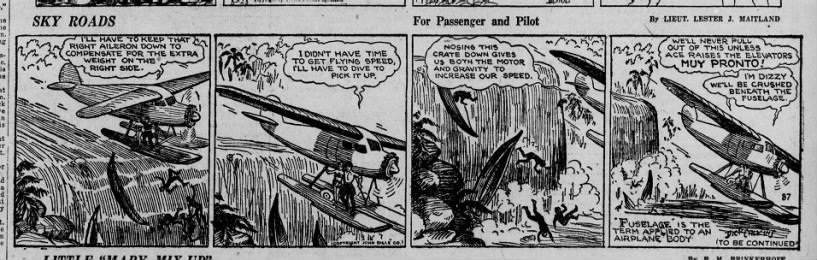
The Evening News, Harrisburg, Pennsylvania Wed, Aug 28, 1929 Page 23

Unlike other serialized comic strips, Skyroads did not have a single focal character over the course of its printing run. Instead, it focused on aviation as a whole, telling different stories with a different set of characters every few years. Three distinctive periods appeared over the publication history of Skyroads, each with its own defined set of characters. The first featured were Ace Ames and Buster Evans who owned and operated the Skyroads Unlimited transport company. This duo was followed by Hurricane Hawk and then Speed McCloud.

Clipper Williams, a member of the Flying Legion, soared into air adventures with his kid sidekick, Tommy. Eventually, the Flying Legion became the focus instead of Clipper Williams, a plot situation that remained until the series concluded in 1942.

== Radio and books ==
Pin promoting both comic strip and newspaper.

On February 13, 1939, the Mutual Broadcasting System began a radio adaptation of Skyroads that ran four months and came to a conclusion on May 19. Two Better Little Books were published (1936, 1939) with the Skyroads characters. A brief return occurred in the 1960s with reprints in a saddle-stitched magazine format by publisher Edwin Aprill. However, only one volume was published by April.
