= Fountain Grove, California =

Human settlement in United States of America

Coordinates: 38.48705°N 122.71021°W

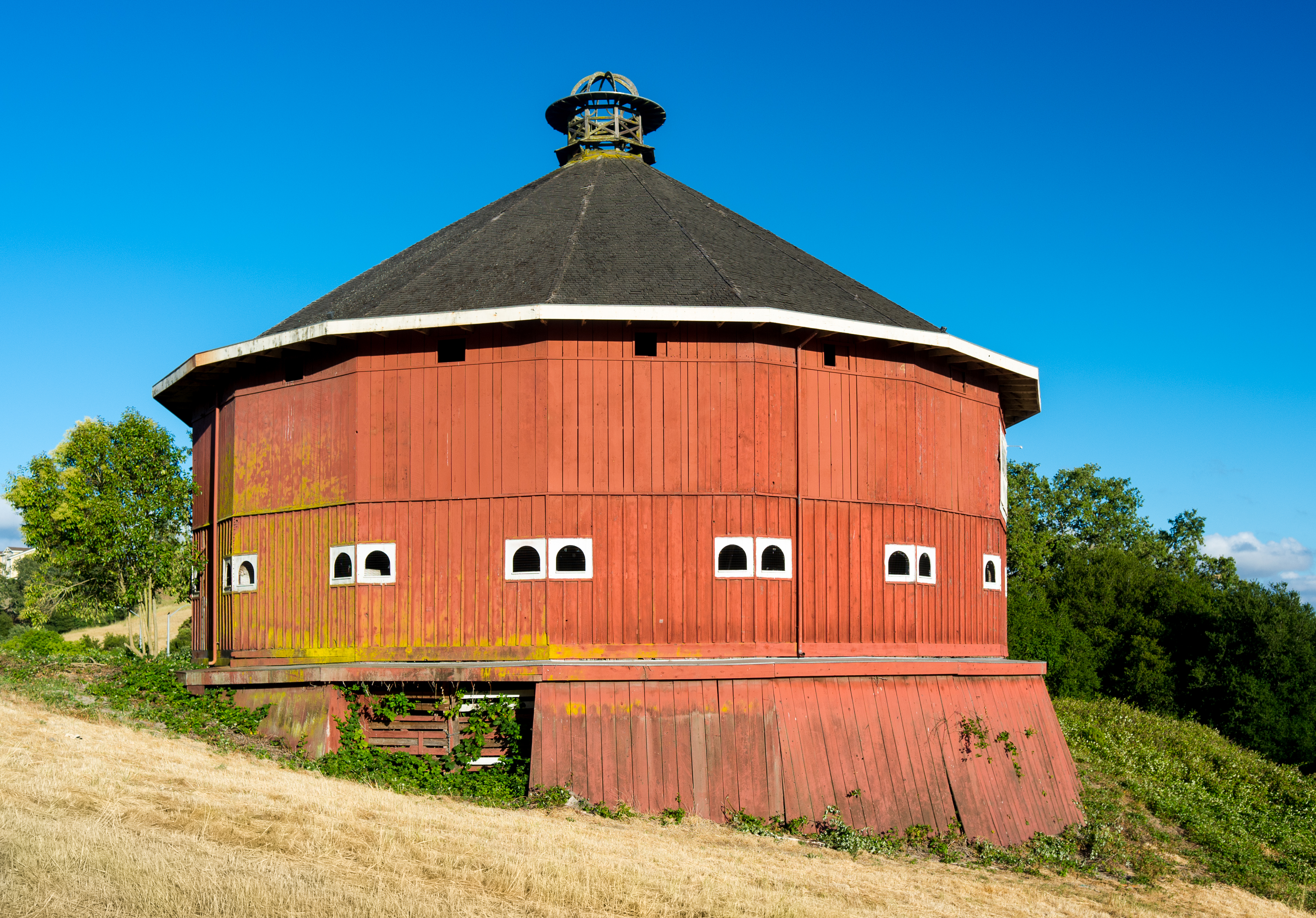
Fountaingrove Round Barn, built while Kanaye Nagasawa ran the Fountaingrove estate. The historic building was destroyed on October 9, 2017, during the Tubbs Fire.

Fountain Grove was a utopian colony founded near Santa Rosa, California, by Thomas Lake Harris in 1875. Most of its settlers were followers of Harris's Brotherhood of the New Life and moved with Harris from their previous colony at Brocton, New York.

The neighborhood now refers to the modern-day Fountaingrove, in north Santa Rosa, west of Hidden Valley and east of Bicentennial Way and Piner Road areas. It has 3,500–4,000 residents. Much of it was burned down in the 2017 Tubbs Fire; most homes were rebuilt or replaced by 2019.

== History ==
Nagasawa Kanaye (1852–1934) was Harris' California lieutenant, who acted as developer and manager of the community's 2,000 acres (8 km^{2}) of vineyards near Santa Rosa. He also succeeded Harris and acted as leader of the brotherhood until 1934.

The main structure was a two-story mansion originally occupied by Harris, his wife, and a handful of utopians; it was also used for important guest lodging and common meals. It was called "Aestivossa" by Harris, which he said meant "high country of divine joy" in a language only he understood. The structure was commonly referred to as the manor house. Luxuriously furnished, it was in the center of a ring of eucalyptus trees and little gardens and a lily pond, but Harris maintained that his "real palace" was in "interspace." According to Brotherhood guidelines, all of the structures in the Fountain Grove commune were built to be taken physically into the "Celestial Sphere." The manor house was demolished in 1970.

== Modern neighborhood ==
Harris' community left a significant stamp on the history of Santa Rosa, and today that part of town is still called Fountaingrove, and a street, Thomas Lake Harris Drive, is named for Harris. The round barn that was part of the winery was a noted landmark in the area until its loss to fire in 2017.

The former Fountain Grove Winery buildings, now owned by Medtronic, are slated for demolition. The original winery was founded in 1882 and ceased operations in the early 1940s.

Today the neighborhood is known to be home to some of the city's wealthiest residents. Fountaingrove and Skyfarm together comprise the most expensive neighborhoods in the city and the county as a whole.

The neighborhood was severely affected by the 2017 Tubbs Fire, which destroyed many homes, along with the Fountaingrove Inn and the round barn.

== See also ==
- Fountaingrove Lake
- Keysight (technology company headquartered in Fountaingrove)
