= Lake Erie State Park =

State park in Chautauqua County, New York

- Location within New York
- Type: State park
- Location: 5838 Lake Road; Brocton, New York
- Coordinates: 42°25′23″N 79°25′52″W
- Area: 355 acres (1.44 km^{2})
- Operator: New York State Office of Parks, Recreation and Historic Preservation
- Visitors: 97,565 (in 2014)
- Open: All year
- Website: Lake Erie State Park

Lake Erie State Park is a 355-acre (1.44 km^{2}) state park located in the Town of Portland in Chautauqua County, New York, United States, northeast of the village of Brocton. Its major attraction is its Lake Erie beach, in addition to its campsites and other recreational facilities.

== Park facilities ==
The park includes facilities and trails for hiking, cross-country skiing, birdwatching, fishing, boating and camping at one of its 97 campsites or 10 cabins. Swimming is available on scheduled days and times at the beach. An 18-hole disc golf course named "Shipwreck Bluff DGC" was constructed at the park in 2015. The park sells discs and clothing related to the course.

== See also ==
- List of New York state parks
