= Portland, New York =

- Town
- Location within Chautauqua County and New York state

- Location within New York Location within the United States
- Coordinates: 42°22′58″N 79°27′43″W
- Country: United States
- State: New York
- County: Chautauqua

Government
  - Type: Town Council
  - Town Supervisor: Daniel F. Schrantz (D)
  - Town Council: Members' List: • Jerry Boltz (D); • Rick M. Manzella (R); • David L. McIntyre (R); • Gary Miller (R)

Area
  - Total: 34.18 sq mi (88.53 km^{2})
  - Land: 34.12 sq mi (88.36 km^{2})
  - Water: 0.066 sq mi (0.17 km^{2})
- Elevation: 784 ft (239 m)

Population (2020)
  - Total: 4,366
  - Estimate (2021): 4,344
  - Density: 136.7/sq mi (52.79/km^{2})
- Time zone: UTC-5 (Eastern (EST))
  - Summer (DST): UTC-4 (EDT)
- ZIP Codes: 14769 (Portland); 14716 (Brocton); 14787 (Westfield); 14063 (Fredonia); 14048 (Dunkirk); 14166 (Van Buren Point); 14728 (Dewittville); 14757 (Mayville); 14784 (Stockton)
- Area code: 716
- FIPS code: 36-013-59421
- GNIS feature ID: 0979388
- Website: townofportlandny.gov

Portland is a town in Chautauqua County, New York, United States. The population was 4,366 according to the 2020 census. The town is on the shore of Lake Erie southwest of Dunkirk.

== History ==
The area was first settled in 1804. The town of Portland was founded in 1813 from the town of Chautauqua. Subsequently, the town was reduced in size to form two new towns: Ripley (1816) and Westfield (1829).

Portland was the site of an 1872 fatal train wreck.

A genealogical history of Portland was published in 1873 by Dr. H. C. Taylor, titled Historical Sketches of the Town of Portland, New York. An all names index was created for this book by Agnes Lee Mitchell in 1989 and published by the Chautauqua County Genealogical Society.

== Geography ==
According to the United States Census Bureau, the town has a total area of 34.18 square miles (88.53 km^{2}), of which 34.12 square miles (88.36 km^{2}) is land and 0.07 square miles (0.17 km^{2}), or 0.19%, is water.

The New York State Thruway (Interstate 90) and US 20 cross the northern part of the town. NY 5 parallels the shore of Lake Erie.

=== Communities and locations in Portland ===
- Brocton – The village of Brocton is located in the eastern part of the town. Nearby is Lakeview Shock Incarceration Correctional Facility.
- Greencrest – A lakeside hamlet on the Lake Erie shore in the northeast part of the town.
- Green Hills – A hamlet on the shore of Lake Erie.
- Lake Erie State Park – A lakeside park in the northeast part of the town.
- Portland – The town government is located in this hamlet, located on Route 20 west of Brocton.
- Skinner Switch – A location west of Portland.
- Van Buren Point – A hamlet on the Lake Erie shore in the northeast part of the town, east of Greencrest.
- Vineyard – A hamlet northwest of Brocton.
- West Portland – A hamlet on Route 20 near the west town line.

== Demographics ==
Historical population
Census	Pop.	Note	%±
1820	1,162		—
1830	1,771		52.4%
1840	2,136		20.6%
1850	1,905		−10.8%
1860	1,984		4.1%
1870	1,887		−4.9%
1880	2,014		6.7%
1890	2,423		20.3%
1900	2,690		11.0%
1910	3,058		13.7%
1920	3,140		2.7%
1930	3,001		−4.4%
1940	2,965		−1.2%
1950	3,339		12.6%
1960	3,605		8.0%
1970	3,802		5.5%
1980	4,433		16.6%
1990	4,832		9.0%
2000	5,502		13.9%
2010	4,827		−12.3%
2020	4,366		−9.6%
2021 (est.)	4,344		−0.5%
U.S. Decennial Census

The Lakeview Shock Incarceration Correctional Facility is within Portland, and their residents are therefore counted in the following demographics.

As of the census of 2000, there were 5,502 people, 1,655 households, and 1,161 families residing in the town. The population density was 160.6 inhabitants per square mile (62.0/km^{2}). There were 2,096 housing units at an average density of 61.2 per square mile (23.6/km^{2}). The racial makeup of the town was 82.93% White, 12.05% African American, 0.49% Native American, 0.02% Asian, 0.02% Pacific Islander, 3.51% from other races, and 0.98% from two or more races. Hispanic or Latino of any race were 8.62% of the population.

There were 1,655 households, out of which 33.1% had children under the age of 18 living with them, 55.8% were married couples living together, 9.4% had a female householder with no husband present, and 29.8% were non-families. 25.4% of all households were made up of individuals, and 12.0% had someone living alone who was 65 years of age or older. The average household size was 2.57 and the average family size was 3.08.

In the town, the population was spread out, with 21.2% under the age of 18, 16.2% from 18 to 24, 32.3% from 25 to 44, 19.7% from 45 to 64, and 10.7% who were 65 years of age or older. The median age was 33 years. For every 100 females, there were 140.5 males. For every 100 females age 18 and over, there were 148.4 males.

The median income for a household in the town was $30,909, and the median income for a family was $37,006. Males had a median income of $27,464 versus $21,636 for females. The per capita income for the town was $12,881. About 8.9% of families and 11.2% of the population were below the poverty line, including 15.9% of those under age 18 and 6.7% of those age 65 or over.

== Notable people ==
- David B. Hulburt, Wisconsin state legislator, surveyor, and farmer, was born in Portland.
- Darren Manzella, United States Army sergeant, Army medic, and gay activist, lived in Portland.
