= Dave Gerard (cartoonist) =

American cartoonist

- Born: David Gerard; June 18, 1909 Indiana, U.S.
- Died: August 31, 2003 (aged 94) Indiana, U.S.
- Area: Cartoonist
- Notable works: Will-Yum; City Hall; Citizen Smith

Mayor of Crawfordsville, Indiana
- In office 1972–1976

Personal details
- Education: Wabash College

Dave Gerard (June 18, 1909 – August 31, 2003) was an American humor cartoonist and local politician, known for his contributions to Collier's Weekly, Country Gentleman, and The Saturday Evening Post.

== Early life and education ==
A Gerard panel from The Saturday Evening Post, 04/09/1949: "In about 15 minutes I'm taking a nap. How about beating the drum now and reading the comics later?"

Born and raised in Indiana, Gerard was a 1931 graduate of Wabash College in Crawfordsville, Indiana. He was among the Crawfordsville-area cartoonists known as “The Sugar Crick Art School,” Bill Holman perhaps being the most famous of the group.

== Career ==
Gerard began a 35-year relationship with the John F. Dille Co. newspaper syndicate (later known as the National Newspaper Syndicate) in 1949 with his comic strip Viewpoint, which ran until 1953. That was succeeded by the popular strip Will-Yum, which ran from 1953 to 1966. (Will-Yum was also featured in a Dell comic book.) Gerard's City Hall strip was distributed by the National Newspaper Syndicate from 1967 to 1984.

Gerard was also the creator of Citizen Smith, a strip distributed by the Register and Tribune Syndicate that featured an everyman beset by everyday frustrations; this work appeared in The Indianapolis Star in the 1970s and 1980s.

Dave Gerard was the mayor of Crawfordsville, Indiana, from 1972 to 1976.
