= Lakeview Shock Incarceration Correctional Facility =

Men's prison in Brocton, New York, US

Coordinates: 42°24′28″N 79°26′06″W

- Interactive map of Lakeview Shock Incarceration Correctional Facility
- Location: 9300 Lake Avenue Brocton, New York
- Status: open
- Security class: medium/ mixed
- Capacity: about 1100
- Managed by: New York State Department of Corrections and Community Supervision

Lakeview Shock Incarceration Correctional Facility is a medium security shock incarceration prison in New York in the United States. The prison is located in the Village of Brocton, in Chautauqua County, New York. The facility provides special treatment for non-violent offenders.

The mission of New York State Department Corrections and Community Supervision (DOCCS) is “to improve public safety by providing a continuity of appropriate treatment services in safe and secure facilities where inmates’ needs are addressed and they are prepared for release, followed by supportive services for all parolees under community supervision to facilitate a successful completion of their sentence”. In July 1987, New York State established the Shock Incarceration Program through legislation, which mandated that the DOCCS create a six-month program that would prepare young, non-violent inmates for early release consideration. Lakeview Shock Incarceration Correctional Facility is like a boot camp that is intended to shock an offender into changing poor behavioral patterns.

Lakeview Shock Incarceration Correctional Facility offers several programs to give inmates the tools to maintain a healthy and sober lifestyle once released on parole. Staff conducts one mandated program, the Alcohol Substance Abuse Treatment/Network program (ASAT) and held one-day per week and one evening per week with each platoon; and every other week the ASAT Network also facilitates a confrontation group. Documentation showed that community meetings are at least weekly. In addition, Network staff conducts one Network class per week with each platoon. Information reviewed indicates that community meetings are observed daily. According to information reviewed, in all, inmates receive over 570 hours of ASAT/Network programming while they participate in the Shock Incarceration Program. Lakeview Shock Academic Education program includes 12 hours of weekly academic study where every student spends two three-hour modules once a week and three-hour evening classes twice a week. In the PREA Audit Report Page 8 of 110, Lakeview Shock Incarceration C.F. inmates are able to obtain their General Education Diploma (GED) through the education program. The Vocational Education Program at Lakeview Shock Incarceration Correctional Facility consists of trade shops. Vocational programs are provided in two modules four days a week (three hours each module) and two nights per week (three hours each night) or two modules five days a week (Three hours each module). Each shop has a capacity of 19–20 inmates to attend each of the modules. Lakeview offers seven vocational programs including Custodial Maintenance, Computer Operator/Digital Literacy & MOS Certification, Building Maintenance, Floor Covering, Horticulture, Painting & decorating, and Upholstery.
