= Brad Anderson (cartoonist) =

American cartoonist (1924–2015)

- Born: Bradley Jay Anderson; May 14, 1924; Jamestown, New York, U.S.
- Died: August 30, 2015 (aged 91); The Woodlands, Texas, U.S.
- Education: Syracuse University (BFA)
- Occupation: Cartoonist
- Years active: 1954–2015
- Spouse: Barbara Anderson
- Children: 4
- Awards: Inkpot Award, 1975

Signature
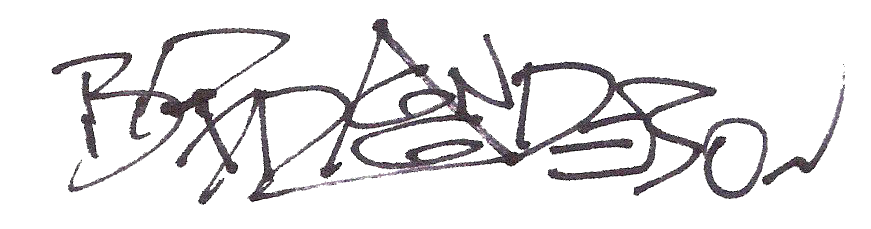

Bradley Jay Anderson (May 14, 1924 – August 30, 2015) was an American cartoonist and creator of the comic strip Marmaduke.

== Early life and career ==
Anderson graduated from Brocton Central School in Brocton, New York, in 1942 and then served with the United States Navy until 1946, during which time he submitted cartoons to be published in several Navy publications. Initially aspiring to be an industrial designer, Anderson attended Syracuse University on the G.I. Bill; in 1951 he graduated with a B.F.A. with a major in advertising. Anderson went to work for Ball & Grier, an advertising agency in Utica, New York; however, in 1953, Anderson decided to focus on freelance magazine cartooning. From 1954 to 1966, Anderson drew the comic strip Grandpa's Boy.

== Marmaduke ==
Brad Anderson is best known for creating the comic strip Marmaduke in 1954, which he continued to draw until his death. According to Anderson, "During the time, I was drawing various types of dogs in my magazine cartoons, I was also trying to develop a dog character specifically for eventual newspaper syndication [....] you couldn't see the eyes of my shaggy dogs, so as I thought more about it I decided I wanted a dog where I could have an expressive face". Anderson, who said that he drew on Laurel and Hardy routines for his ideas, received the National Cartoonists Society Newspaper Panel Cartoon Award for Marmaduke in 1978.

Anderson made appearances on Animal Planet's Breed All About It and Dogs 101.

Anderson's studio was re-created for the National Comedy Center in Jamestown, New York, which opened on August 1, 2018. The donated studio includes Anderson's original drawing board and materials.

== Personal life ==
Anderson was married and had one daughter, Christine, and three sons, Craig, Paul and Mark with his wife Barbara. Anderson died on August 30, 2015, in The Woodlands, Texas, at the age of 91 of congestive heart failure. He was buried at Portland Evergreen Cemetery in Portland, New York.

Anderson became a Freemason in Brocton and was also a member of the Scottish Rite.

A statue of Anderson and a dog representing Marmaduke was dedicated in 2016 in Brocton.
