= Lester J. Maitland =

United States Air Force general (1899–1990)

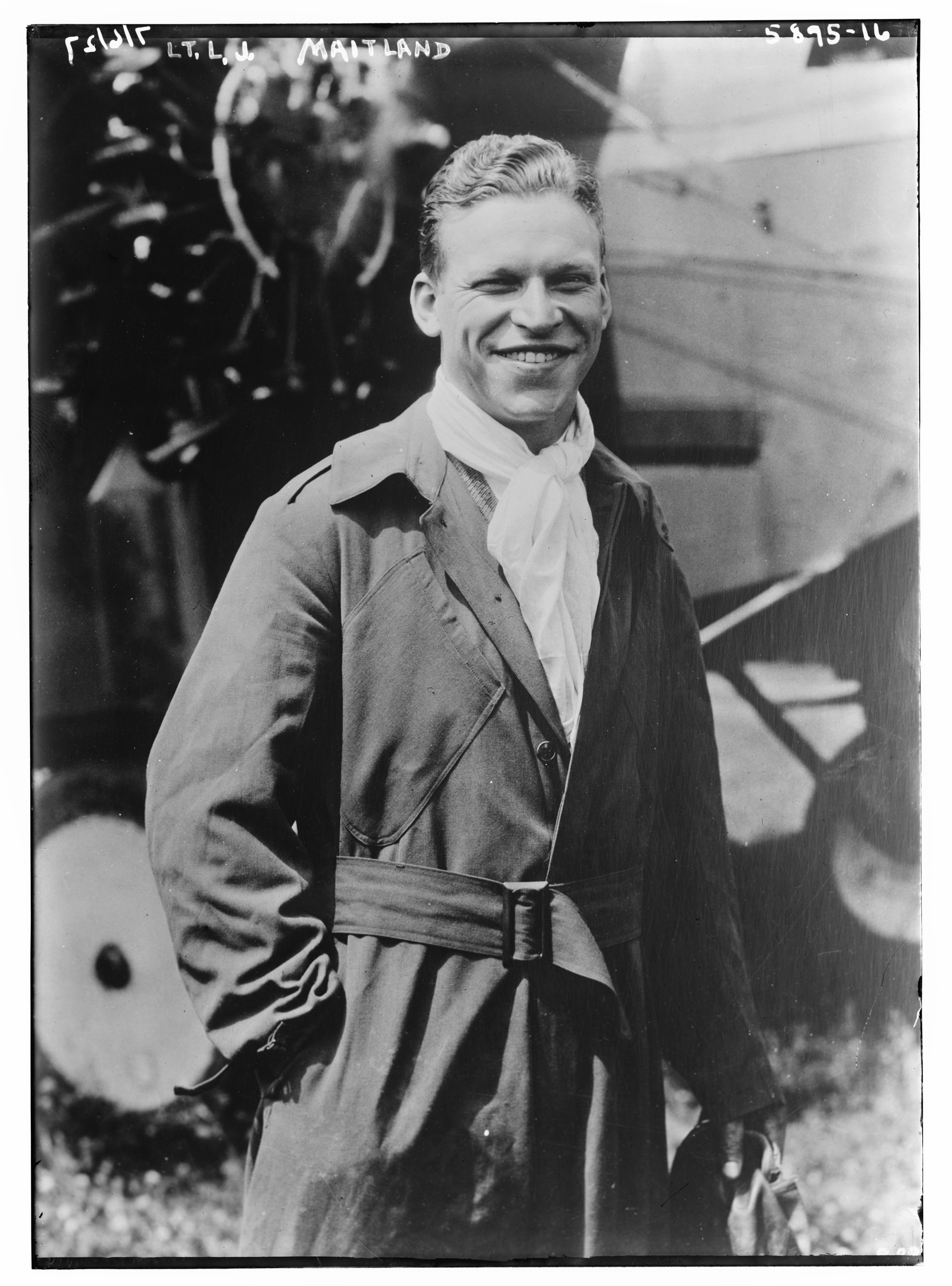
- Born: February 8, 1899; Milwaukee, Wisconsin, U.S.
- Died: March 27, 1990 (aged 91); Scottsdale, Arizona, U.S.
- Military career
- Allegiance: United States
- Branch: Aviation Section, Signal Corps; Air Service, United States Army; United States Army Air Corps; United States Army Air Forces; Michigan Air National Guard
- Service years: 1917–1943, 1951–1956
- Rank: Brigadier general
- Nickname: Les
- Commands: 386th Bomb Group (medium); 28th Bombardment Squadron; 8th Attack Squadron
- Conflicts: World War II
- Awards: Silver Star; Distinguished Flying Cross
- Other work: Director, Wisconsin Aeronautics Commission; Michigan Director of Civil Defense; Episcopal lay-minister

Lester James Maitland (February 8, 1899 – March 27, 1990) was an aviation pioneer and career officer in the United States Army Air Forces and its predecessors. Maitland began his career as a Reserve pilot in the U.S. Army Air Service during World War I and rose to brigadier general in the Michigan Air National Guard following World War II.

In 1927 Maitland and Lt. Albert F. Hegenberger completed the first transpacific flight from California to Hawaii, flying the modified transport Bird of Paradise. Although the recognition accorded them was less in comparison with the adulation given Charles Lindbergh for his transatlantic flight only five weeks earlier, Maitland and Hegenberger's feat was arguably more significant from a navigational standpoint.

Maitland continued his career in the Air Corps, serving in combat as a bombardment group commander during World War II. He later became the first director of the Wisconsin Aeronautics Commission and the Director of Civil Defense for the state of Michigan before changing professions and becoming an Episcopal minister.

== Early history and World War I ==
Born in Milwaukee, Wisconsin in 1899, Maitland graduated from Riverside High School in 1917. He enlisted as an aviation cadet in the Aviation Section, U.S. Signal Corps three days after the United States entered World War I and was assigned to training at a School of Military Aeronautics on the campus of the University of Texas in Austin, Texas in the fall of 1917. His flight training took place at Rich Field in Waco, Texas, after which he received a rating of Reserve Military Aviator and was commissioned on May 25, 1918, as a 2nd lieutenant in the Air Service, National Army at the age of nineteen. After a stint as a flying instructor, he was sent to gunnery school at Taliaferro Field, Texas, but the war ended before he could be sent overseas.

== Between wars ==
Following World War I, Maitland was assigned to McCook Field in Ohio from November 1918 to April 1919 as a pilot with the Testing Squadron. Maitland was transferred to Luke Field, Hawaii, and assigned to the 6th Aero Squadron on May 13, 1919. He petitioned to remain in the Army, passed the required examinations, and received a regular commission as a 1st lieutenant in the Air Service on July 1, 1920, the date that the service was recognized by law as an organizational part of the Army. Leaving Hawaii in May 1921, Maitland became an aide to General Billy Mitchell in July and was selected as one of the pilots to take part in the sinking of the battleship Ostfriesland, a military experiment set up by Mitchell to prove the effectiveness of air power against ships. In September and October 1925 he acted as an aide to Mitchell during the Morrow Board hearings.

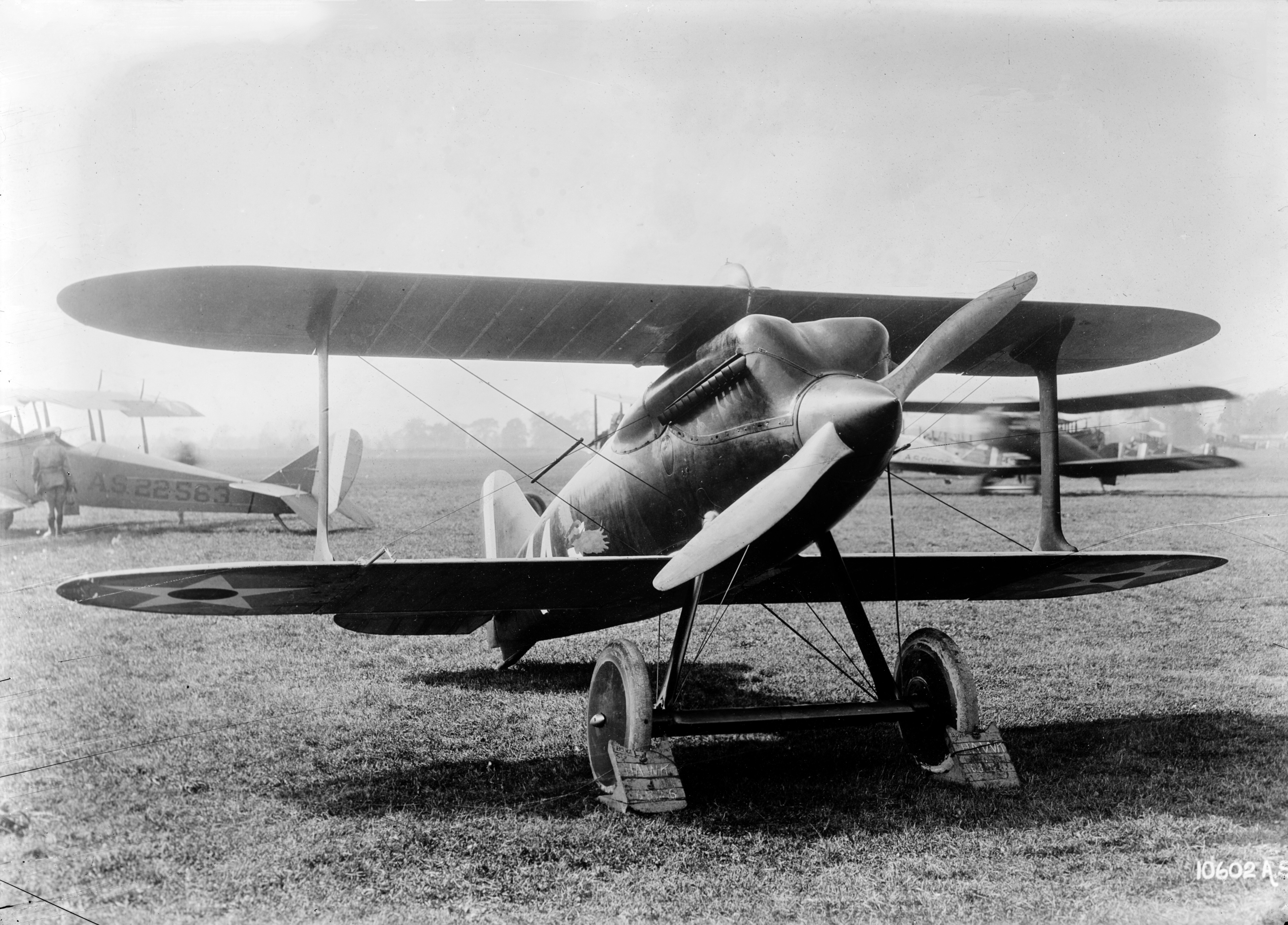
Curtiss R-6 racer

During the 1920s, Maitland competed for the Air Service and its Air Corps successor in air races and pioneering flights as part of the service's program of generating favorable publicity. While Operations Officer for Col. Augustine Warner Robins at the Fairfield Air Intermediate Depot (FAID) in October 1922, he was part of the Army team at the National Air Races held that year at Selfridge Field, Michigan. On October 14, he reputedly became the first U.S. pilot to fly faster than 200 mph (320 km/h) and received a letter of congratulations from Orville Wright. Flying a Curtiss R-6 racer over a 50-kilometer (31-mile) course, Maitland finished second in the Pulitzer Trophy race, behind Army test pilot Lt. Russell Maughan but ahead of four Navy and eight Army racers, averaging 198.8 mph (319.9 km/h) and reporting brief blackouts during the tight pylon turns. On March 29, 1923, he set a world's absolute speed record of 236.58 mph (380.74 km/h) over one kilometer in the R-6, but the record was disqualified because he failed to maintain level flight. (Note: According to the Air Service News Letter of May 2, 1923 (Vol. VII, No. 9, p. 2) the disqualification was made by Orville Wright, the official observer of the National Aeronautics Association, for an unintentional "technical violation." This came soon after his second place finish in the Pulitzer Trophy Race, which occurred because his fuel pump failed after one lap, forcing him to fly the remainder of the race with one hand while he hand-pumped fuel with the other.) However he broke his own record in October when he flew at a recorded speed of 244.94 mph (394.19 kmh), also in the R-6.

On March 17, 1925, Maitland was assigned command of the new 18th Headquarters Squadron (redesignated from the 18th Observation Squadron) at Bolling Field, a position he held until June 4, 1925, when he returned to FAID. In November 1926 he began a three-year tour as Assistant Executive Officer to Assistant Secretary of War for Air F. Trubee Davison.

=== Flight of the Bird of Paradise ===
While stationed in Hawaii, Maitland sought permission from the Chief of the Air Service to organize a flight between Hawaii and the mainland. Not until December 1926, however, was he granted authorization. Others had also been working on the project, including 1st Lt. Albert F. Hegenberger, former Chief of the Instrument Branch at McCook Field. Hegenberger had overseen the development of a number of navigation instruments that would make the trip feasible but like Maitland had also been transferred to Hawaii, where his repeated written requests for a transpacific flight were likewise refused. In 1926 Hegenberger returned to McCook, where he helped test a navigation system using signals from low-frequency radio beacons. The transpacific flight from California to Hawaii was then approved to demonstrate the difficult task of navigating to a small island using the beacons as a navigational aid.

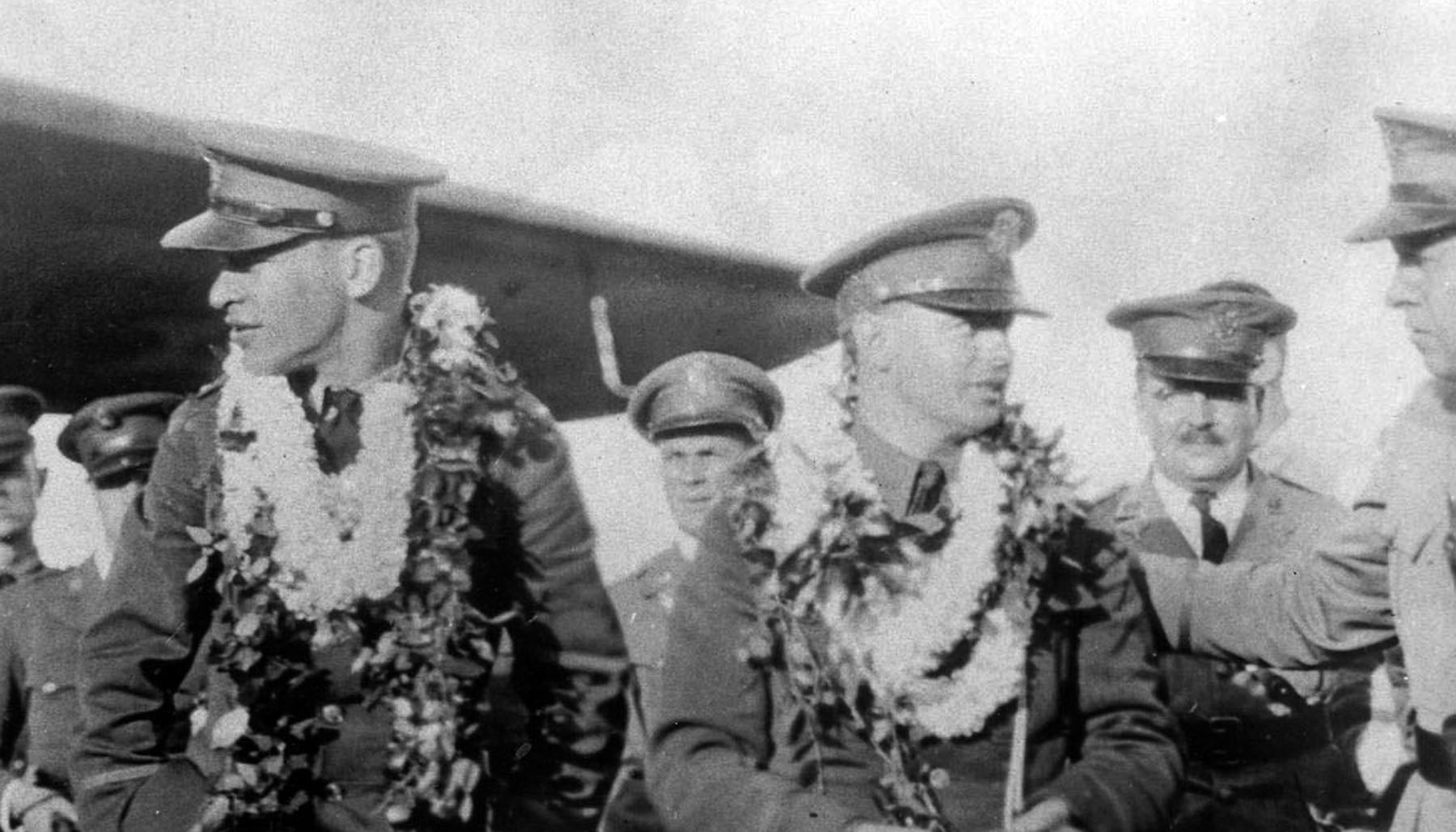
Lieutenants Lester J. Maitland (left) and Albert F. Hegenberger (right) at Wheeler Field, Hawaii, after the first non-stop flight from California to Hawaii in 1927.

On June 15, 1927, Maitland and Hegenberger took the chosen airplane, an Atlantic-Fokker C-2 transport plane nicknamed the Bird of Paradise, and a team of aeronautical engineers cross country to check fuel consumption and the reliability of the aircraft and its navigational instruments. On June 24, while in San Diego, California, the results of the tests were reported to Secretary of War Dwight F. Davis and he approved the flight to Hawaii. The next day they flew to Crissy Field, at the Presidio in San Francisco, California.

On June 27, Maitland and Hegenberger made the short hop from Crissy Field to the newly opened Oakland Municipal Airport, whose 7,000 feet (2,100 m) runway was much preferable for the takeoff roll with full fuel load, and departed the next morning just after 7 a.m. for Wheeler Field, Oahu, with Maitland as pilot and Hegenberger as navigator. Although assisted as planned by the Signal Corps beacon on Maui, the directional radio receiver in the C-2 operated only intermittently before cutting out altogether. The earth inductor compass on the C-2 failed just after takeoff, and despite increasingly cloudier weather, Hegenberger navigated most of the charted Great Circle route by dead reckoning, using a magnetic compass and driftmeter supplemented by celestial navigation observations. Contact with several ships at sea was used to verify their position and adjust the original flight plan.

23 hours into the flight, before dawn on June 29, the crew observed a lighthouse beam on Kauai in the Hawaiian Islands at their estimated time of arrival, but still in complete darkness, decided to circle until daybreak before landing at Wheeler. The Bird of Paradise completed its trip of 2,407 miles (3,874 km) in 25 hours and 50 minutes, and was greeted by thousands of spectators. In becoming the first to make the transpacific crossing to Hawaii, Maitland and Hegenberger earned the third awarding of Distinguished Flying Cross by the Air Corps and received the Mackay Trophy for that year. Of the feat, the official history of the United States Air Force states:

The flight...tested not only the reliability of the machine but the navigational skill and the stamina of the two officers as well, for had they strayed even three-and-a-half degrees off course, they would have missed Kauai and vanished over the ocean.

In 1928 Maitland and Charles Lindbergh were invited together to the White House to meet President Calvin Coolidge.

=== Air Corps years ===
Maitland wrote Knights of the Air, a history of early aviation emphasizing "aviation firsts" that included his own transpacific flight, and was published in 1929. (Note: Knights of the Air was published by Doubleday, Doran & Co.) He then undertook writing Skyroads a serialized comic strip about aviation in 1929 with artist and fellow World War I pilot Dick Calkins. The pair continued to release Skyroads until they passed the writing and drawing duties to Calkins' assistant Russell Keaton in 1933.

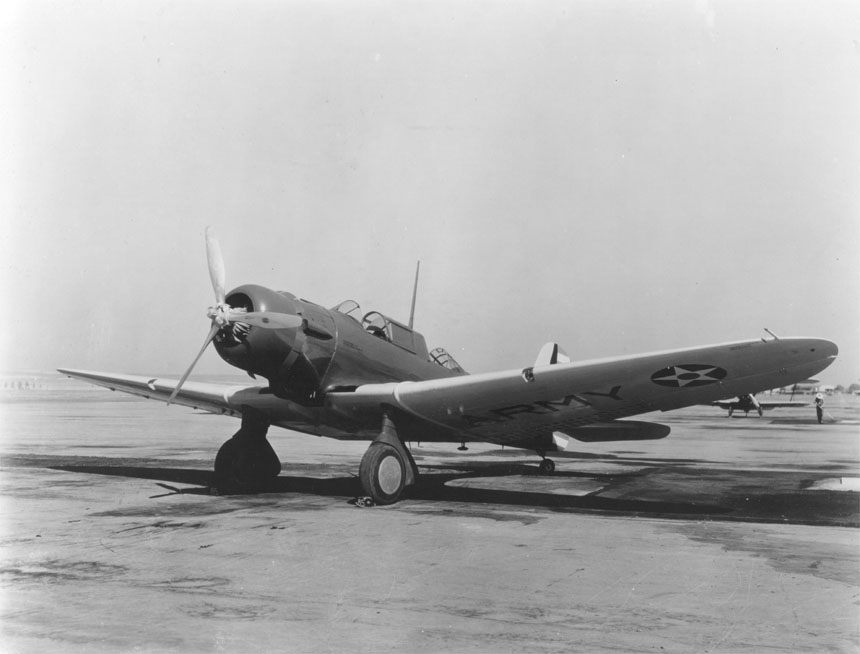
Northrop A-17

After his tour in Washington D.C. concluded in December 1929, Maitland served at Kelly Field, Texas, as a flight instructor in the Advanced Flying School. He was promoted to captain in 1932. Maitland served in various positions in the Training Command at Kelly, including senior instructor in Attack, to September 1934, when he entered the Air Corps Tactical School at Maxwell Field as a student in the comprehensive 845-hour, 36-week course. Making up the 59 members of his class were five majors, 40 captains including himself, 13 first lieutenants, and one second lieutenant. In addition to 49 Air Corps officers were four Army officers, one from each of that service's combat arms, two Turkish Army aviators, one Mexican captain, and three Marine Corps aviators. Among Maitland's Air Corps peers were future generals Muir S. Fairchild, Barney Giles, Laurence S. Kuter, Haywood Hansell, and Hoyt S. Vandenberg; and aviation pioneer Major Vernon Burge, who as a corporal in June 1912 had been the first certified enlisted military pilot. Maitland graduated in June 1935. From September 11, 1935, to July 16, 1938, he commanded the 8th Attack Squadron at Barksdale Field, Louisiana, flying the Northrop A-17 attack bomber.

On July 20, 1940, Major Maitland and his wife Kathleen "Kay" Maitland were sent to the Philippine Department for a two-year tour of duty in command of the 28th Bombardment Squadron. By seniority he was also made base commander of Clark Field, where the 28th BS was stationed. On March 13, 1941, he was promoted to lieutenant colonel and command of the 28th BS passed to a more junior officer, but Maitland remained base commander at Clark. Shortly after, the Army extended the tours of all Air Corps personnel in the Philippine Department by an additional year, fearing aggressive Japanese moves against the Philippines, and ordered their dependents to return to the United States. This created a serious morale problem that Maitland combatted at Clark, at the suggestion of a subordinate, by issuing an order in May 1941 that all base personnel (including himself) had to grow beards. He modified the order in mid-August, making beards optional, but he and many others maintained their facial hair.

== World War II ==
Maitland was on the headquarters staff of the newly created Far East Air Force when the United States entered World War II. On November 3, 1941, the 19th Bomb Group completed its reinforcement movement to the Philippines and its commander, Lt. Col. Eugene Eubank, was senior to Maitland at Clark Field. When the FEAF was activated on November 16, Maitland was named as executive officer of the Far East Air Service Command. The FEAF was surprised and largely destroyed by Japanese air attack on December 8, 1941, and Gen. Douglas MacArthur ordered its headquarters withdrawn to Australia on December 24. Maitland joined a small group of staff officers flown out from Nielson Field on Christmas Day by Captain Paul I. "Pappy" Gunn in a former Philippine Air Lines Beech 18.

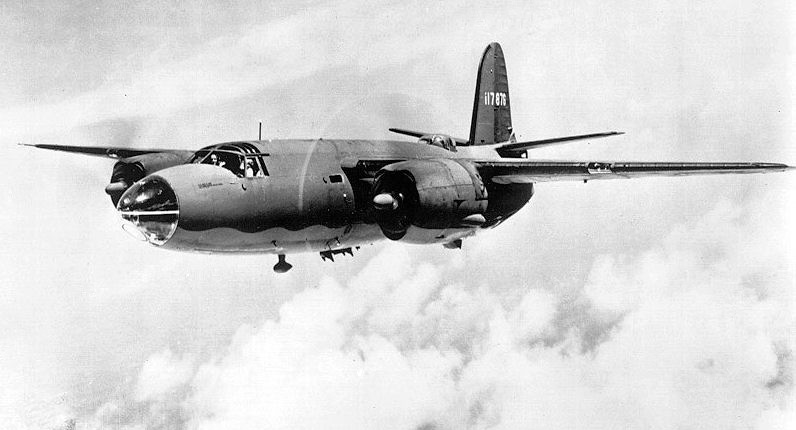
B-26 Marauder of the 386th Bomb Group, 1943

Reassigned to duty in the United States, Maitland was named to command the 386th Bomb Group, flying Martin B-26 Marauders, upon its activation on December 1, 1942, at MacDill Field, Florida. He organized the group and moved it on February 9, 1943, to Lake Charles Field, Louisiana, to complete its group combat training, which was accomplished without losses of any B-26s to accident in more than 10,000 hours of flight. (Note: The B-26 had a reputation among pilots as a "hot" aircraft that was notoriously difficult to fly for novices. Although the 386th BG did not lose a B-26 in training, a Lockheed B-34 assigned to tow targets for aerial gunnery practice did crash with loss of life.) In June 1943 the group moved to England and was assigned to the 3rd Bomb Wing of the Eighth Air Force on June 4, 1943. Based at the new station at RAF Boxted, the 386th did not immediately enter combat because extreme losses to B-26s of the already operational 322nd Bomb Group, attacking at low altitudes, forced a suspension of all B-26 operations to develop new tactics. Over the following seven weeks the 386th embarked on an intensive training program covering aircraft recognition, flying control procedures, German fighter tactics, combat formations, and medium altitude bombing (between 10,000 and 15,000 feet (3,000 and 4,600 m)),.

After flying four diversionary missions in mid-July, the 386th BG began combat operations on July 30, 1943, attacking the Luftwaffe fighter base at Woensdrecht Airfield in the Netherlands. The attack was the first at medium altitude by B-26s in Europe and was sharply contested by Focke-Wulf Fw 190 fighters of II./JG 26. The group, attacking alone, suffered its first loss, a bomber at the rear of the formation nicknamed Wolf and carrying 2nd Lt. Cyrus S. Eaton, Jr., son of the investment banker. Another B-26, Two Way Ticket, crashed on takeoff and was a total loss. (Note: Eaton was the only survivor of his seven-man crew and became a POW; the crew of Two Way Ticket all survived.)

The group continued its attacks on Luftwaffe bases in France and the Low Countries throughout the summer of 1943. On September 24, 1943, the 386h moved to a new base still under construction at RAF Great Dunmow, and flew its final mission as part of the Eighth Air Force on October 8, an attack on airfields in the vicinity of Lille that was abandoned because of bad weather. While with the Eight Air Force it flew 32 missions, losing six bombers in combat, and developed the procedure for the simultaneous release of bombs by formations of B-26s. It also earned a Distinguished Unit Citation for its first year of operations, part of which was under Maitland's command. On October 18 the 386th resumed operations from Great Dunmow as part of the Ninth Air Force, with Maitland leading the group in an attack on Beauvais-Nivillers airdrome in France. He also led the group in an attack on the construction site of the fortress of Mimoyecques, France, on November 5.

At age 44, Maitland was one of the oldest pilots to see combat in World War II, personally leading four of first five missions of the 386th in a B-26 nicknamed the Texas Tarantula, but his tenure was cut short when he was relieved of command on November 18, 1943, possibly for excessive drinking. (Note: Bartsch noted that Maitland was commonly known to be a heavy drinker (December 8, 1941: MacArthur's Pearl Harbor, pp. 65-66).) Maitland received the Silver Star, a second award of the Distinguished Flying Cross, and five Air Medals. The first group history, The History of a Bombing Outfit, said of its first commander:

His leadership of the group had been strong and colorful. He had been rough on those who did not produce but fine to those who had. He had given a lot of character to the group, and although he had been rough at times, had been fair always. The group was sorry to see him go.

== After World War II ==
In 1947, Maitland was appointed Wisconsin's first state aeronautics director. He resigned the post in 1949 over the lack of priority the state gave to airports and flying. He accepted a similar post with the state of Michigan and in 1951 went on to become Michigan's Director of Civil Defense, for which he was appointed a brigadier general in the Michigan Air National Guard. In the mid-1950s Lester Maitland's career goals shifted and he was given permission by the state of Michigan to begin seminary studies. He would go on to become a lay-minister in the Episcopal Church. His first appointment was as lay-vicar at a parish in Iron River, Michigan. He retired as rector emeritus in Red Bluff, California.

Maitland died at a convalescent home in Scottsdale, Arizona in 1990. He was 91 years old.

== Awards and decorations ==
=== Citation for Distinguished Flying Cross ===
General Orders: War Department, General Orders No. 16 (1927)
Action Date: June 28–29, 1927
Service: Army Air Corps
Rank: First Lieutenant

The President of the United States of America, authorized by Act of Congress, July 2, 1926, takes pleasure in presenting the Distinguished Flying Cross to First Lieutenant (Air Corps) Lester J. Maitland, U.S. Army Air Corps, for extraordinary achievement while participating in an aerial flight. As pilot of the United States airplane, by his masterly skill, courage, endurance, and tenacity of purpose, with his navigator, Lieutenant Maitland successfully piloted his airplane on 28–29 June 1927, from Oakland, California, to Honolulu, Territory of Hawaii, over the greatest expanse of open sea yet crossed in a nonstop flight. Lieutenant Maitland, with full knowledge of the dangers and difficulties, traversed over 2,400 miles of the Pacific Ocean with marvelous accuracy of direction, and thereby demonstrated conclusively the practicability of accurate aerial navigation. His masterful exploit is worthy of the greatest praise and has bestowed much credit on the United States Army.

=== Recognition legacy ===
Maitland Field, a downtown lakefront airport in Milwaukee between 1927 and 1956, was named at a ceremony honoring Maitland for the transpacific flight on July 18, 1927, during his return trip from Hawaii. In 1987 he was elected to the Wisconsin Aviation Hall of Fame. Maitland Drive, near the Oakland International Airport in California, is also named for him.

== Works ==
- Knights of the Air (1929)

== Notes ==
Footnotes

Citations
