= Marmaduke =

Comic strip

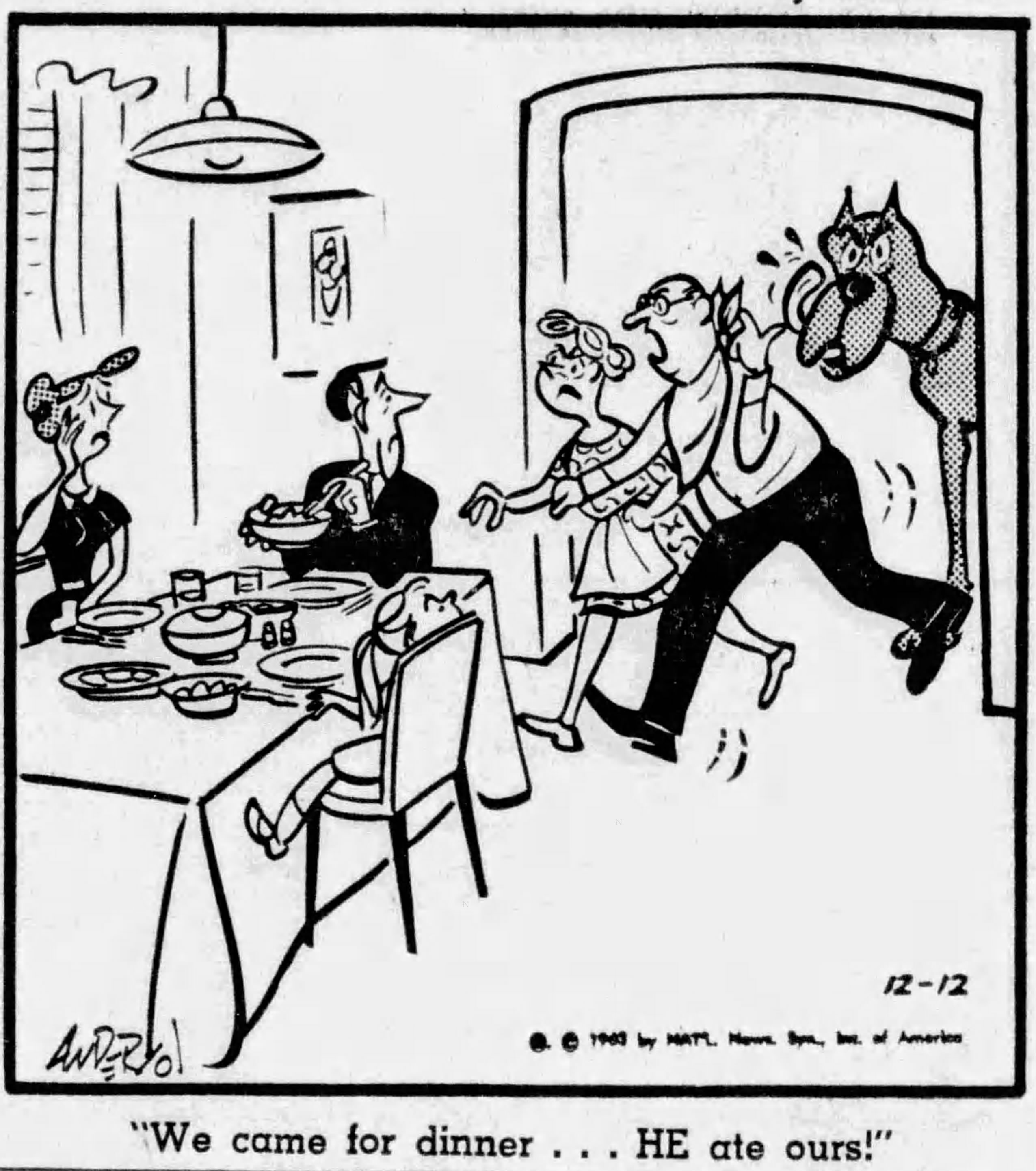
- A Marmaduke comic from December 1963
- Authors: Brad Anderson (1954–2015); Phil Leeming (1955–1962); Dorothy Leeming (1963–1969); Paul Anderson (2015–present)
- Illustrators: Brad Anderson (1954–2015); Paul Anderson (2004–present)
- Current status/schedule: Active
- Launch date: November 15, 1954
- Syndicates: National Newspaper Syndicate (1954–1975); United Feature Syndicate (1976–present)
- Publisher: Ballantine Books
- Genre: Humor

Marmaduke is a newspaper comic strip revolving around the Winslow family and their Great Dane, Marmaduke, drawn by Brad Anderson from November 15, 1954 to 2015.

== Publication history ==
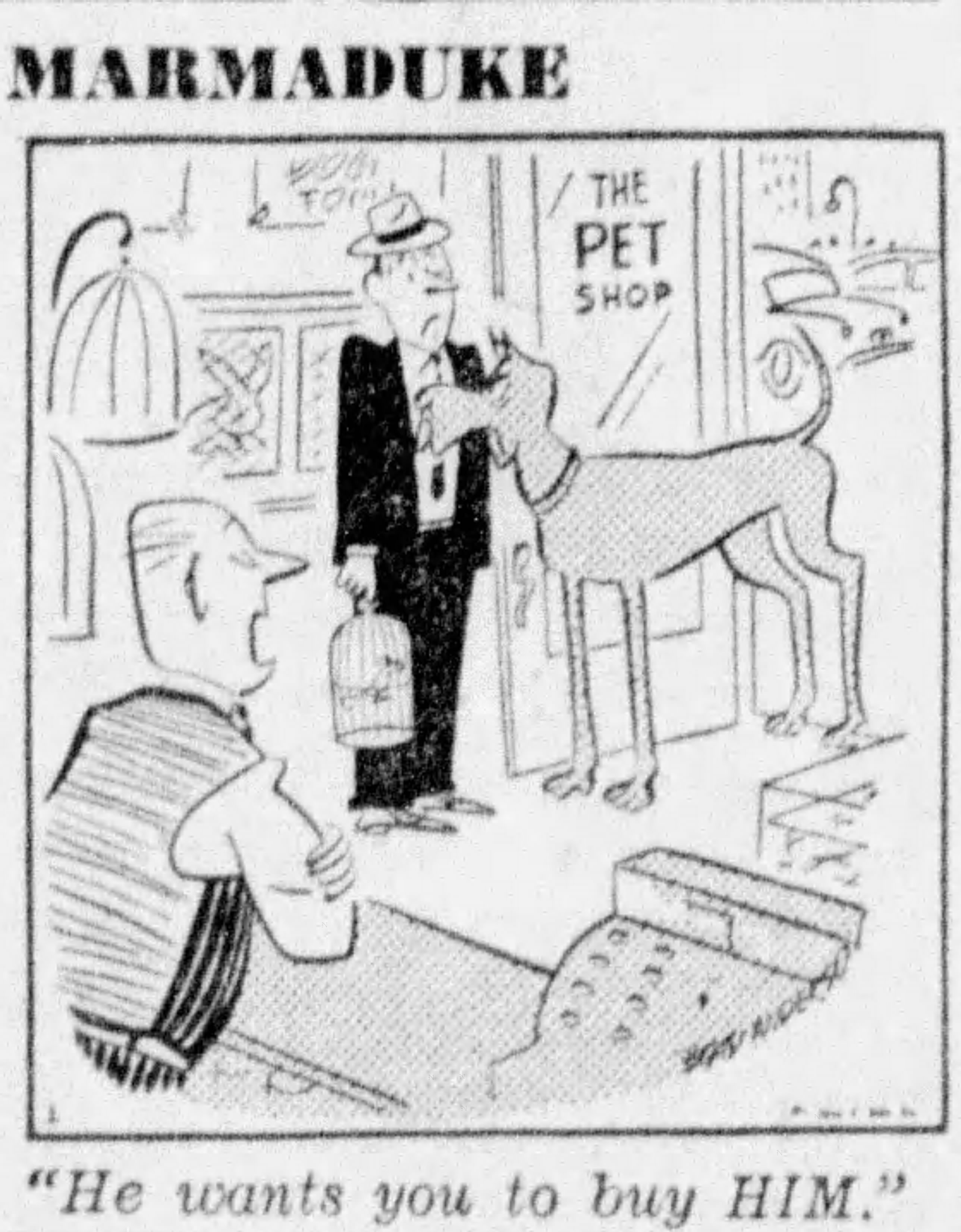
The first Marmaduke strip, published in The Cincinnati Enquirer on November 15, 1954

The strip was created by writer Phil Leeming and artist Brad Anderson, and sold to the John F. Dille Co. (later known as the National Newspaper Syndicate) in 1954. Anderson said he drew on Laurel and Hardy routines for his ideas. Anderson illustrated the strip, writing it with help from Phil Leeming (1955–1962) and later Dorothy Leeming (1963–1969), and, after August 2, 2004, Anderson's son Paul.

The strip on Sundays also has a side feature called "Dog Gone Funny", in which one or more panels are devoted to dog anecdotes submitted by the fans.

Brad Anderson died on August 30, 2015, at the age of 91, leaving the long-term fate of the strip unknown; strips co-drawn with the help of his son, Paul Anderson, continue to be syndicated.

== Characters ==
- Marmaduke – a messy but lovable Great Dane owned by the Winslow family; he is large even for his breed, and has regularly been drawn as apparently measuring 40 inches (102 cm) and upwards at the withers.
- Phil – patriarch of the Winslow family
- Dottie – matriarch of the Winslow family
- Barbie – the Winslows' older child
- Billy – the Winslows' younger child
- Mr. and Mrs. Snyder – the Winslows' neighbors
- King Tut – A Siamese cat, based on Brad Anderson's pet, who is Marmaduke's nemesis

== Reception ==
Brad Anderson won the National Cartoonists Society's Reuben Award for Newspaper Panel Cartoon in 1978, and the George Arents Pioneer Medal for Syracuse University alumni in 1999.

As of 2015, Marmaduke continues to be widely syndicated, and is popular with readers. Attempts to cancel Marmaduke have drawn protest, such as those by readers of The Toronto Star in 1999, of the Sarasota Herald Tribune in 2007, and of the Chicago Sun-Times in 1986.

=== Criticism ===
The strip's longevity and perceived monotony have been noted by publications such as The Onion and have made it the butt of jokes. It has become "a hot source of retro-ironic-subversive humor." For example, a blog called "Joe Mathlete Explains Today's Marmaduke" deconstructs the strip to offer an alternative explanation for what is happening in the drawing. Another blog called "Marmaduke Can Vote" gives each panel a political slant, while another called "Poignant Marmaduke" changes all the captions to make the comics sad. Additionally, "The Marmaduke Project" re-imagines Marmaduke in other forms.

The Comic Strip Doctor, David Malki of Wondermark included Marmaduke for analysis of strips he disliked, alongside Heathcliff, Family Circus, and Dennis the Menace.

== Adaptations ==
=== Animated series ===
Ruby-Spears produced Marmaduke segments for the 1980 animated series Heathcliff, whose title character was also based on a comic strip character. In this animated version, the male characters were voiced by Paul Winchell and the females were voiced by Russi Taylor.

=== Films ===
A live-action Marmaduke movie, in which the Winslows and their dog move from Kansas to California, was released on June 4, 2010, to a critical and commercial flop. The film featured Owen Wilson as the voice of Marmaduke, Lee Pace as Phil Winslow, Judy Greer as Debbie Winslow, Caroline Sunshine as Barbara Winslow, and Finley Jacobsen as Brian Winslow.

It was announced on the Andrews McMeel website that an animated film adaptation of Marmaduke was planned to be released sometime in 2022. The film featured Pete Davidson as Marmaduke, J.K. Simmons as Zeus, Brian Hull as Guy Hilton, Shelby Young as Shantrelle, and David Koechner as Phil Winslow. It was released on Netflix on May 6, 2022 and like the live-action film was panned by critics.
