= Nagasawa Kanaye =

American winemaker (1852–1934)

Kanaye Nagasawa
- 長澤 鼎（Nagasawa Kanae)
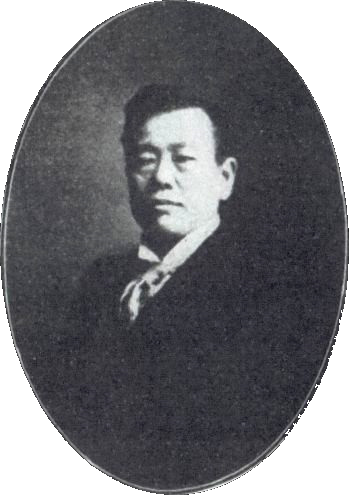
- Born: Isonaga Hikosuke (磯永 彦輔); February 2, 1852; Kagoshima, Satsuma domain, Japan
- Died: February 14, 1934 (aged 82); California, United States
- Occupation: Winemaker
- Family: Isonaga Magashiro (?) 磯永孫四郎 (father); Fumi フミ (mother)
- Awards: Order of the Rising Sun; Order of the Sacred Treasure

Kanaye Nagasawa (né Isonaga Hikosuke; February 2, 1852 – February 14, 1934) was an American winemaker in California, the first former Japanese national to live permanently in the United States, a recipient of the Order of the Rising Sun, and a disciple of Thomas Lake Harris, the self-proclaimed "Father and Pivot and Primate and King of the Brotherhood of the New Life". Nagasawa followed Harris from New York out to Santa Rosa, California, where he eventually took over Harris' Fountaingrove estate. Nagasawa died in 1934, but the round barn he constructed at Fountaingrove was a landmark in Sonoma County.

== Early life ==
Nagasawa was born in Kagoshima, Japan, on February 2, 1852, a member of the Satsuma clan and the son of a samurai. At age 12 or 13, he was one of 15 Satsuma students smuggled out of Japan and sent to the United Kingdom to learn Western customs, technology and systems. At this time, he was granted a new name by his lord in order to protect his family from any possible legal repercussions as most foreign travel was forbidden at the time.

Nagasawa, being too young for university, was sent to Aberdeen, Scotland, to live with the family of Thomas Blake Glover and attend school. In Scotland, he met English nobleman Laurence Oliphant, who was a disciple of Thomas Lake Harris and had been asked to find potential recruits for his New York State commune. Oliphant took Nagasawa, along with five other Satsuma students, to New York to join Harris' community there. Nagasawa studied at Cornell University for one year in 1870. While the other students who had left Japan with Nagasawa returned home shortly afterwards, he stayed with Harris and eventually followed him out to California when Harris left Brocton, New York.

== Fountaingrove ==
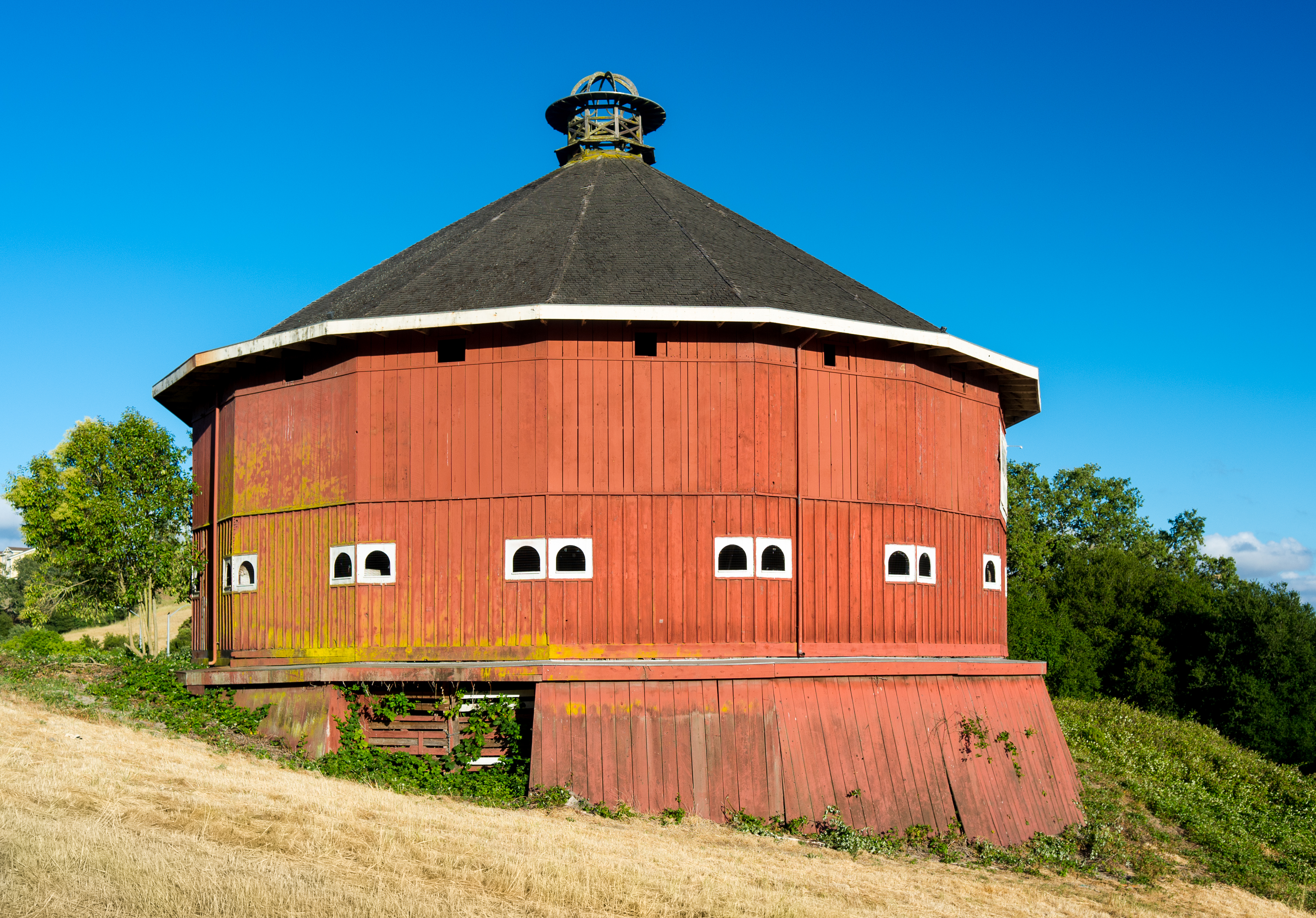
The Fountaingrove Round Barn, built while Kanaye Nagasawa ran the Fountaingrove estate, was destroyed by wildfire in 2017.

Nagasawa arrived in California in 1875 at age 23. The community Harris established in Santa Rosa was named Fountaingrove, and the ranch encompassed 1,000 acres. Harris brought winemaker Dr. John Hyde to the property to plant grapes and instruct the disciples in viticulture. Nagasawa became winemaker after Hyde left, and made wine for the Brotherhood of the New Life's store in New York City as well as for the British Isles. Nagasawa introduced California wines to the international world, including Europe and Japan. The wine won several medals and was widely marketed. Harris attributed the wine's success to the spiritual qualities of the Fountain Grove community. Harris left Fountain Grove in 1891, though, after journalist Alzire Chevaillier wrote several articles for the San Francisco Chronicle saying that the commune leader was a charlatan. Harris died in 1906 without ever returning to Fountain Grove, and Nagasawa took over the estate. When Harris eventually died in 1906, Nagasawa became the leader of The Brotherhood of the New Life and lead the cult until his death. By 1916, however, he was the only cult member still resident at Fountaingrove, and although other members visited from time to time, missionary activity had effectively ceased during the later years of Harris' life.

Nagasawa became the top wine producer in California. In Japan, he earned the "Wine King of California" nickname, and has been described as "the Robert Mondavi of his time". In 1915, he helped run the Japanese Exhibit at the Panama-Pacific Exhibition in San Francisco. He was often referred to as "Prince Nagasawa" or "Baron Nagasawa" because of his samurai heritage, and hosted extravagant parties at Fountaingrove throughout Prohibition, at which the wine flowed freely. In an elaborate ceremony at Fountaingrove, Nagasawa was awarded the Order of the Rising Sun at the request of Emperor Taishō.

The Fountaingrove Round Barn was built while Kanaye Nagasawa ran the estate. Before the barn burned in the 2017 Tubbs Fire, it was one of very few surviving round barns in California. It was actually 16-sided.

== Death and legacy ==
Nagasawa died in 1934, having endured growing anti-Japanese sentiment in the United States. Services were held in Santa Rosa and he was cremated in the San Francisco Bay Area. Despite efforts to pass the Fountaingrove property on to his relatives, including his American-born grand-nephew and grand-niece, via the California Alien Land Law of 1913, the land was seized by the Santa Rosa City Council and sold in an estate sale. The property became a cattle ranch, and today is largely a residential development, although several hundred acres are still planted. Nagasawa's round barn was a landmark in Santa Rosa, and a 33-acre park was named in his honor in 2007.
