= Thomas Lake Harris =

American spiritualistic "prophet" (1823–1906)

The Reverend Thomas Lake Harris
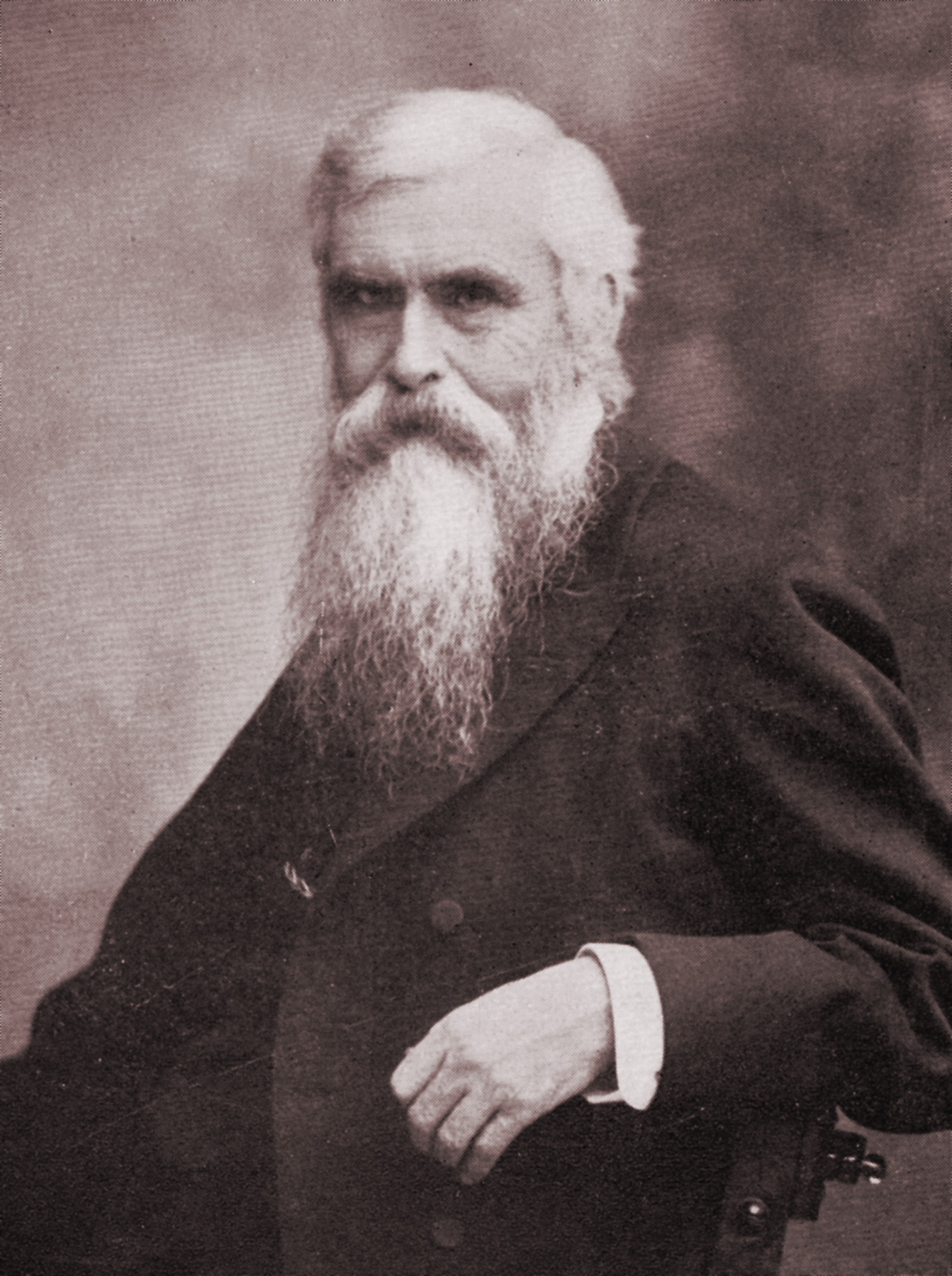
- Born: 15 May 1823; Fenny Stratford, Buckinghamshire, England
- Died: 23 March 1906
- Known for: Leading the Brotherhood of the New Life

Thomas Lake Harris (May 15, 1823 – March 23, 1906) was an Anglo-American Universalist minister, spiritualistic prophet, poet, and vintner. Harris is best remembered as the leader of a series of communal religious experiments, culminating with a group called the Brotherhood of the New Life in Santa Rosa, California.

== Biography ==
=== Early life ===
Thomas Lake Harris was born May 15, 1823, at Fenny Stratford in Buckinghamshire, England. His parents were strict Calvinistic Baptists and very poor. When Harris was five years old his parents emigrated from England, settling in the town of Utica, New York. His mother died when he was still a young boy and Harris was forced by circumstances to help support the family from the age of 9.

At the age of 21 Harris became a Universalist minister, preaching to the congregation of the Fourth Universalist Society in the City of New York.

In 1848, he became minister of an independent Christian congregation in New York City. In that church he came into contact with a young newspaper publisher, Horace Greeley, who was so moved by one of Harris's sermons that he was inspired to organize Harris's congregation to help found the New York Juvenile Asylum.

=== Mysticism and communalism ===
Harris soon turned towards spiritualism, becoming a devotee of the Swedish mystic Emanuel Swedenborg. By 1851 he had departed New York for Virginia, where, together with Rev. J. L. Scott, he launched the first of his communal enterprises, the Mountain Cove Community of Spiritualists, on pristine land, claimed by one of the group's leaders to be the actual site of the Garden of Eden. The intention was to create a "city of refuge" from which angels were to descend and ascend. The experiment was racked by squabbles over property and personalities, and after two years, the Virginia commune collapsed.

Following the collapse of the Mountain Cove Community, Harris went back to his native England, where he preached modified Swedenborgian ideas to a London congregation for several years. There he began his career as a writer and poet, and published several books. Harris's poetry was well-regarded and he was the subject of a chapter by Alfred Austin in his book The Poetry of the Period.

=== Brotherhood of the New Life ===
Harris subsequently returned to America, settling in the town of Amenia in Dutchess County, New York. He remained at Amenia for five or six years, established a bank, a flour mill, and a vineyard, and gathered around him a small group of devoted religious disciples. Included among the approximately sixty converts were five orthodox clergymen and five Japanese from Satsuma Province. The community—the Brotherhood of the New Life—settled at the village of Brocton, New York on the shore of Lake Erie. The nature of the community was co-operative rather than communistic. Harris's followers, numbering at one time about 2,000, in the United States and Great Britain, engaged in farming and industrial occupations. He professed to teach his community a change in the mode of respiration which was to be the visible sign of possession by Christ and the seal of immortality.

In Brocton, Harris established a winemaking industry. In reply to the objections of teetotallers, Harris said that the wine prepared by himself was filled with the divine breath so that all noxious influences were neutralized. Harris also built a tavern and strongly advocated the use of tobacco.

=== Later years ===
Harris took part of the community to Santa Rosa, California, where, in about 1875, he created the Fountain Grove community. For a time, in 1876, Harris discontinued public activities, and issued, to a secret circle, books of verse that mainly dwelt on sexual questions. In 1891, he announced that his body had been renewed and he discovered the secret of the resuscitation of humanity. He also made a third marriage, visited England, and intended to remain there. However, Harris was called back when a fire destroyed large stocks of his wine, and he remained in New York until 1903, when he visited Glasgow. His followers believed that he attained the secret of immortal life on earth, and after his death on the March 23, 1906, declared that he was only asleep. Three months passed before it was publicly acknowledged that he was really dead.

He was succeeded by Nagasawa Kanaye, who led the sect until his death in 1934.

== Dissension and influence ==
About 1881, Laurence Oliphant and his wife broke away from the sect and charged Harris with robbery. They recovered many thousands of pounds from him through legal proceedings. Although they lost faith in Harris himself, they did not abandon his main teaching. Oliphant's view of Harris is found in his novel Masollam. He held that Harris was originally honest, greatly gifted, and possessed of certain psychical powers. But in the end, Harris practiced unbridled license under the loftiest pretensions and made the profession of extreme disinterestedness a cloak to conceal his avarice. He demanded from his followers a blind and supple obedience.

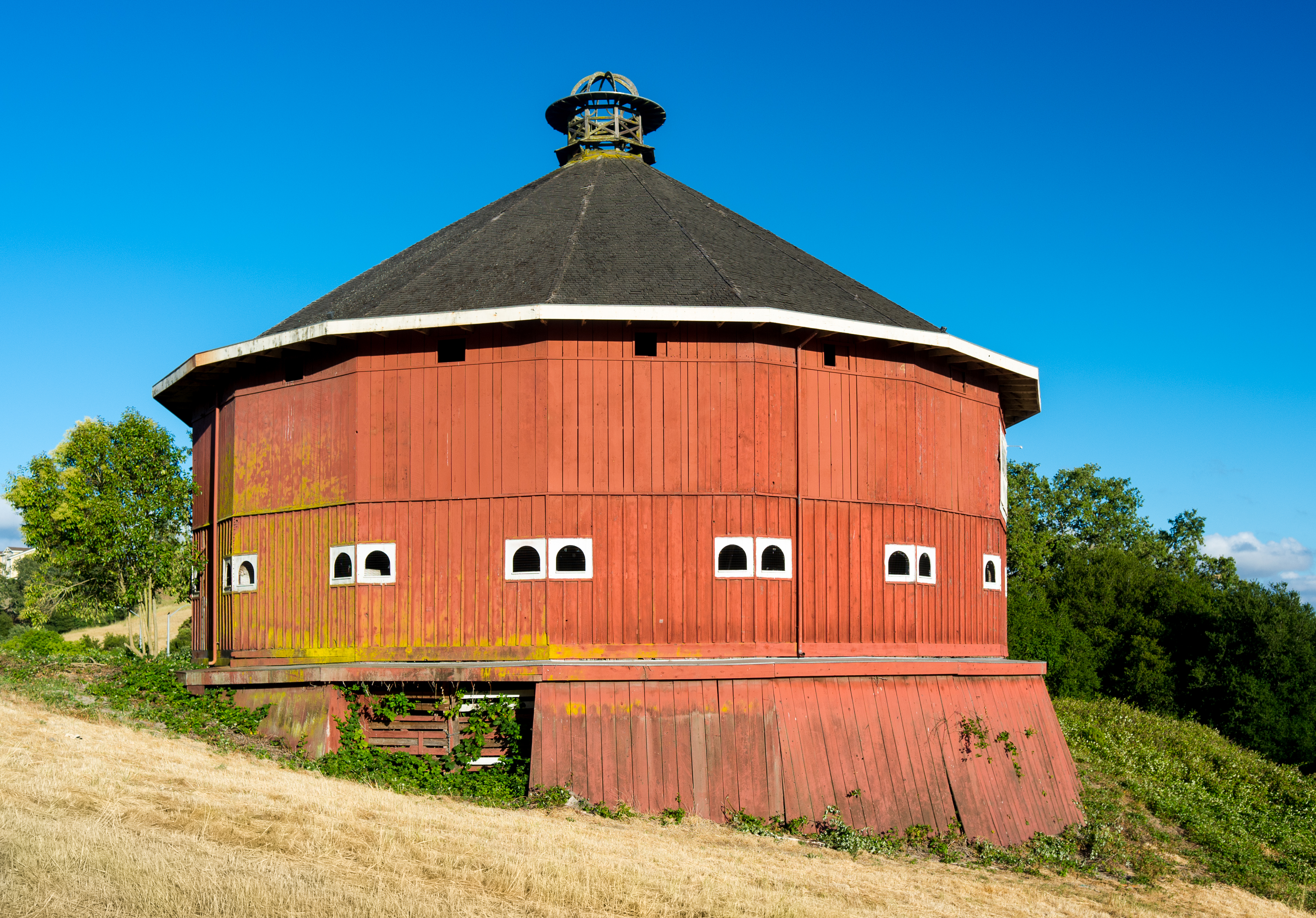
Fountaingrove Round Barn in Santa Rosa, California

The utopian ideals promoted by Harris had significant influence among his Japanese followers. These included:

- Arai Osui (1846–1922), who initially transmitted Harris's ideas to Japan.
- Hatakeyama Yoshinari (1843–1876), later president of Tokyo Kansei Gakko.
- Ichiki Kanjuro (1842–1919), commonly known as Mitsumura Junzo, later an admiral in the Japanese Imperial Navy.
- Samejima Hisanobu (1846–1880), later an ambassador.
- Yoshida Kiyonari (1845–1891), later an ambassador.
- Nagasawa Kanaye (1852–1934), Harris's California lieutenant, who acted as developer and manager of the community's 2,000 acres (8 km^{2}) of vineyards near Santa Rosa. He succeeded Harris and acted as leader of the brotherhood until 1934.

Harris's community left a significant stamp on the history of Santa Rosa; today that part of town is still called Fountaingrove. A street therein, Thomas Lake Harris Drive, is named for him. The round barn that was part of the winery of Harris's protege, Kanaye Nagasawa, was an emblem of the community; it burned in the 2017 Tubbs Fire. A local park and lake were recently named in Nagasawa's honor.

== Publications and sources ==
Harris published a book, Lyra triumphalis, dedicated to A. C. Swinburne. His teaching was esoteric in form, but has been considered a thinly veiled attempt to alter the ordering of sexual relations.

A good deal of verse published by Harris, in more than 40 volumes, was what we would call today science-fictional themes. He depicted interplanetary empires, imperial cities entirely covering planets, and the "ancient astronaut" myth, in which space travellers helped early humans with agriculture, technology and spiritual development.

The Path (Vol. VI, February, 1892, pp. 346–47) printed the article "The Brotherhood of the New Life" by W. Q. Judge, which said that "The Brotherhood of the New Life" has nothing in common with the Theosophical Society. Judge was a follower of Helena P. Blavatsky, the founder of theosophy.

The authoritative biography, written from the perspective of the disciples of Harris, "Life," by A. A. Cuthbert, was published in Glasgow in 1908. The text has language common to Harris's sect and it also contains some biographical facts as well as quotations.

The information about Harris in Memoir of the Life of Laurence Oliphant and of Alice Oliphant, his Wife (1891), by Margaret Oliphant, his cousin, has not been refuted and Oliphant's own portrait of Harris in Masollam seems truthful. But his personal magnetism and self-confidence led many to continue to believe in him.

== Works ==
- Juvenile Depravity and Crime in Our City: A Sermon. New York: C.B. Norton, 1850.
- An Epic of the Starry Heaven. New York: Partridge and Brittan, 1855.
- A Lyric of the Golden Age. New York: Partridge and Brittan, 1856.
- A Lyric of the Morning Land. New York: Partridge and Brittan, 1856.
- Wisdom of Angels (1856)
- Hymns of Spiritual Devotion. New York: New Church Publishing Association, 1857.
- The First Book of the Christian Religion. New York: New Church Publishing Association, 1858.
- Regina: A Song of Many Days. London: William White, 1860.
- The Second Visibility of Jesus. London: William White; Manchester: Johnson and Rawson, [1860].
- Arcana of Christianity: An Unfolding of the Celestial Sense of the Divine Word Through Thomas Lake Harris.
  - Part III — The Apocalypse: Volume 1. New York: Brotherhood of the New Life, 1867.
- Modern Spiritualism (1860)
- The Great Republic: A Poem of the Sun. New York: Brotherhood of the New Life, 1867.
- The Breath of God with Man: An Essay on the Grounds and Evidences of Universal Religion. New York: Brotherhood of the New Life, 1867.
- The Lord: The Two-in-One: Declared, Manifested, and Glorified. Salem-on-Erie, NY:: Brotherhood of the New Life, 1876.
- The Wedding Guest. With Lily C. Harris. [Santa Rosa, CA]: Fountaingrove, 1877-1878.
- Bridal Hours: Dedication Ode for the House of Jesus and Yessa Aestivossa, 1875. [Santa Rosa, CA]: Fountaingrove Vineyard, 1878.
- The Wisdom Of The Adepts: Esoteric Science in Human History. [Santa Rosa, CA]: Fountaingrove, 1884.
- The Joy Bringer: Fifty-three Melodies of the One-in-Twain: February-March MDCCCLXXXVI. [Santa Rosa, CA]: Fountaingrove, 1886.
- Star-Flowers: A Poem of the Woman's Mystery. In Nine Cantos. 1886-1887.
  - Canto the First. [Santa Rosa, CA]: Fountaingrove, 1886.
- The New Republic: A Discourse of the Prospects, Dangers, Duties and Safeties of the Times. [Santa Rosa, CA]: Fountaingrove, 1891.
- God's Breath in Man and in Humane Society. [Santa Rosa, CA]: Fountaingrove, 1891.
- Brotherhood of the New Life: Its Fact, Law, Method and Purpose. Santa Rosa, CA: T.L. Harris, 1891.
- Conversation in Heaven: A Wisdom Song. [Santa Rosa, CA]: Fountaingrove, 1894.
- In Dawnrise: A Song of Songs. [Santa Rosa, CA]: [Fountaingrove], 1896.
- The Song of Theos: A Trilogy. Glasgow: C. W. Pearce & Co., 1903.

== Other sources ==
- Nicoll, William Robertson (1911). "Harris, Thomas Lake" . Encyclopædia Britannica (11th ed.).
- "Harris, Thomas Lake" . Encyclopedia Americana. 1920. This work in turn cites:
  - Allen, T. L. Harris, The Seer (1897)
