= Brocton, New York =

- Village
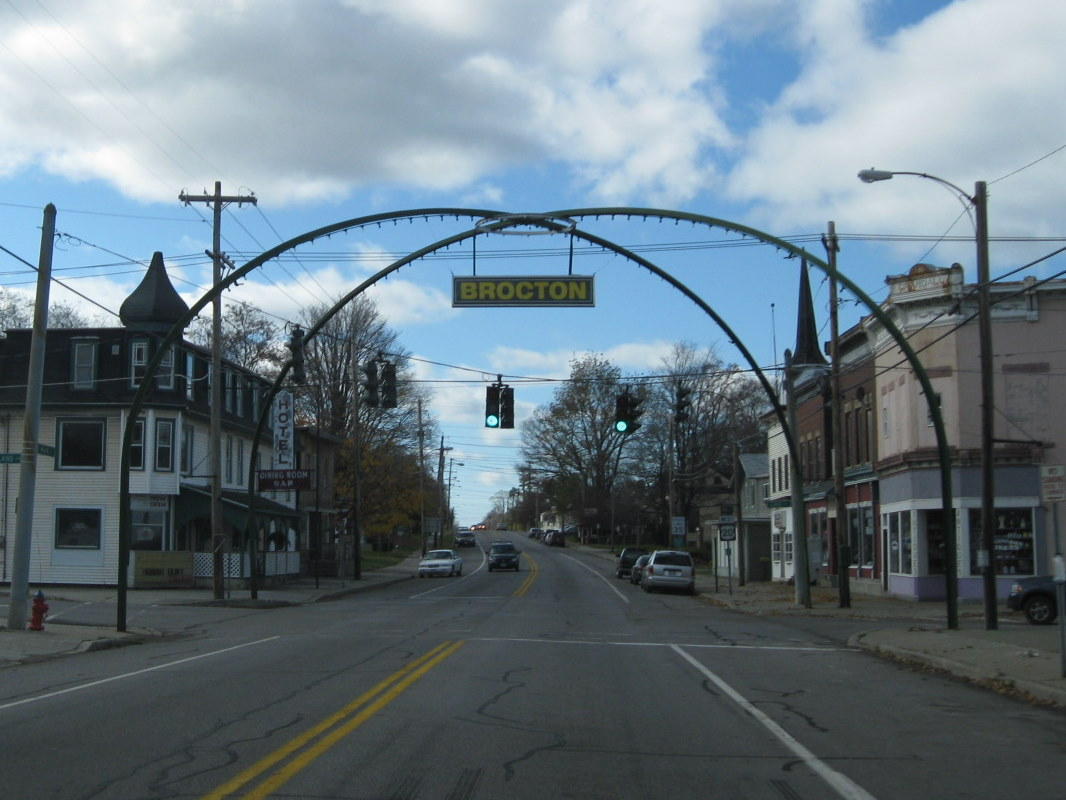
- Brocton Arch
- Motto: "Home of the green arches and historic grape country"
- Location within the state of New York
- Coordinates: 42°23′32″N 79°26′41″W
- Country: United States
- State: New York
- County: Chautauqua
- Town: Portland

Area
  - Total: 1.77 sq mi (4.58 km^{2})
  - Land: 1.77 sq mi (4.58 km^{2})
  - Water: 0 sq mi (0.00 km^{2})
- Elevation: 735 ft (224 m)

Population (2020)
  - Total: 1,286
  - Density: 727/sq mi (280.7/km^{2})
- Time zone: UTC-5 (Eastern (EST))
  - Summer (DST): UTC-4 (EDT)
- ZIP code: 14716
- Area code: 716
- FIPS code: 36-08488
- GNIS feature ID: 0944808
- Website: www.brocton.org

Brocton is a village in Chautauqua County, New York, United States. The name was derived by combining the names "Brockway" and "Minton", two prominent local families. The population was 1,335 at the 2020 census. Brocton is within the town of Portland.

The Lakeview Shock Incarceration Correctional Facility, a state prison, is located just north of the village limits.

== History ==
The community was first settled in 1805 by Captain James Dunn. The village of Brocton was incorporated in 1894. Brocton used to be named "Salems Corners (Cross Roads)" after Salem, Massachusetts, but was later renamed "Brocton".

In 1913, to commemorate the town of Portland's Centennial, a green double-arch was erected over the town's main intersection. It is believed to be the only double-arch east of the Mississippi River. It was listed on the National Register of Historic Places in 1996.

The St. Stephen's Hotel has been a fixture at the center of Brocton since the mid-1800s.

== Brocton Central School ==
The Brocton Central School District is located in the northwest region of Chautauqua County, which is in the westernmost part of New York State. The school campus houses programs for students pre-k through grade 12, with an entire student population of approximately 750 students. The District is located approximately 60 miles southwest of Buffalo, NY and 45 miles northeast of Erie, PA.

Brocton Central School is a component of Erie 2-Chautauqua-Cattaraugus BOCES.

In 2013, Brocton and Westfield School Districts merged their football teams together.

In September 2013, a 16-year-old Damon W Janes running back and defensive on the Brocton Central football team died after head injuries received during a game against Portville.

In 2017, the Brocton/Westfield football team merged with Chautauqua Lake.

== Geography ==
Brocton is located in the northeastern part of the town of Portland, in northern Chautauqua County. According to the United States Census Bureau, Brocton has a total area of 1.71 square miles (4.43 km^{2}), all land.

US 20 passes through the village. The New York State Thruway (Interstate 90) passes just north of the village limits, but the closest access is 8 miles (13 km) to the east near Fredonia. Lake Avenue (former NY Route 380) intersects US 20 in the center of the village and leads north 2 miles (3 km) to Lake Erie State Park.

== Demographics ==
Historical population
Census	Pop.	Note	%±
1870	329		—
1880	288		−12.5%
1890	812		181.9%
1900	900		10.8%
1910	1,181		31.2%
1920	1,383		17.1%
1930	1,301		−5.9%
1940	1,293		−0.6%
1950	1,380		6.7%
1960	1,416		2.6%
1970	1,370		−3.2%
1980	1,416		3.4%
1990	1,387		−2.0%
2000	1,547		11.5%
2010	1,486		−3.9%
2020	1,286		−13.5%
2021 (est.)	1,326	▲	3.1%
U.S. Decennial Census

As of the census of 2000, there were 1,547 people, 623 households, and 414 families residing in the village. The population density was 893.1 inhabitants per square mile (344.8/km^{2}). There were 670 housing units at an average density of 386.8 per square mile (149.3/km^{2}). The racial makeup of the village was 96.38% White, 0.65% African American, 1.29% Native American, 0.06% Pacific Islander, 0.65% from other races, and 0.97% from two or more races. Hispanic or Latino of any race were 1.94% of the population.

There were 623 households, out of which 33.5% had children under the age of 18 living with them, 49.6% were married couples living together, 11.7% had a female householder with no husband present, and 33.5% were non-families. 29.4% of all households were made up of individuals, and 16.9% had someone living alone who was 65 years of age or older. The average household size was 2.48 and the average family size was 3.08.

In the village, the population was spread out, with 26.6% under the age of 18, 9.7% from 18 to 24, 25.7% from 25 to 44, 22.7% from 45 to 64, and 15.4% who were 65 years of age or older. The median age was 37 years. For every 100 females, there were 88.7 males. For every 100 females age 18 and over, there were 80.9 males.

The median income for a household in the village was $27,500, and the median income for a family was $36,328. Males had a median income of $27,059 versus $22,214 for females. The per capita income for the village was $13,901. About 11.4% of families and 13.2% of the population were below the poverty line, including 18.5% of those under age 18 and 6.3% of those age 65 or over.

As of 2021, the updated population of Brocton is 1,326.

== Notable people ==
- Brad Anderson, cartoonist
- Jay Kristopher Huddy, artist, filmmaker, and video game designer
- Thomas Lake Harris, spiritualist
- George Pullman, industrialist
- Don Reinhoudt, strongman
