= Heathcliff =

Heathcliff may refer to:

- Heathcliff (Wuthering Heights), the central character from the novel Wuthering Heights by Emily Brontë
  - Heathcliff (musical), a musical based on the book Wuthering Heights
- Heathcliff Slocumb, American baseball player
- Mark and Sarah Heathcliff, characters from the analog horror web series The Mandela Catalogue
- Heathcliff (comic strip), a comic strip about a cat of the same name
  - Heathcliff (1980 TV series), a cartoon based on the above comic strip, produced by Ruby-Spears
  - Heathcliff (1984 TV series), a cartoon based on the same comic strip, produced by DiC
  - Heathcliff: The Movie, a theatrical film composed mainly of several episodes of the 1984 TV series
- Dr. Heathcliff "Cliff" Huxtable, the lead character on The Cosby Show, played by Bill Cosby
- Heathcliffe Hope, a character from the TV series Emmerdale
- Heathcliff, Fred's butler in the 2014 film Big Hero 6
- Heathcliff, a character in the 2023 video game Limbus Company based on the character from Wuthering Heights
