= List of television series based on comic strips =

This is a list of television series based on comic strips. For the purposes of this list, a comic strip is a cartoon or sequence of cartoons that tell a story and were published in magazines and newspapers in the "comics" section, most commonly in a panel-high "strip".

== Live-action ==
- The Addams Family
  - The Addams Family (1964–1966)
  - The New Addams Family (1998–1999)
  - Wednesday (2022–present)
- Andy Capp (UK, 1988)
- Beakman's World (1992–1998)
- Betaal Pachisi (India, 1997)
- Blondie (1957)
- Blondie (1968–1969)
- Buck Rogers
  - Buck Rogers (1950–1951)
  - Buck Rogers in the 25th Century (1979–1981)
- Dennis the Menace (1959)
- Dick Tracy (1950–1951)
- The Dumplings (1976)
- Fishing in the Footsteps of Mr. Crabtree (United Kingdom, 2013)
- Flash Gordon
  - 1954 series
  - 2007 series
- Hazel (1961–1966)
- Historias de la puta mili (Spain, 1994)
- Jane (UK, 1982–1984)
- Jungle Jim (1955–1956)
- Makinavaja (Spain, 1995–1986)
- La parejita (Spain, 2008)
- The Phantom (1961, pilot episode)
- The Phantom (2011, miniseries)
- Quico, el progre (Spain, 1992–95)
- The Return of Iljimae (South Korea, 2009)
- Terry and the Pirates (1952–1953)
- Tom Corbett, Space Cadet (1950–1955)
- Steve Canyon (1958–1959)
- Um Menino Muito Maluquinho (Brazil, 2006)
- Valentina (1989)
- Wild Palms (1993)
- Woke (2020–2022)

== Animated ==
- The Addams Family
  - The Addams Family (1973)
  - The Addams Family (1992–1993)
- The Adventures of Hijitus (Argentina, 1967–1974)
- Animal Crackers (1997–1999)
- Archie's TV Funnies – includes segments based on Dick Tracy, Broom-Hilda and other comic strips (1971)
- Baby Blues (2000–2002)
- Beetle Bailey and His Friends (1963–1989)
- Big Nate (2022)
- Billy the Cat (1996–2001)
- The Boondocks (2005)
- Castle Town Dandelion (2015)
- Chacha Bhatija (2016–2017)
- Committed (2001)
- Curiosity Shop – includes segments based on B.C. and Miss Peach (1971)
- Defenders of the Earth (1986–1987)
- Dennis the Menace
  - Dennis the Menace (1986–1988)
  - All-New Dennis the Menace (1993)
- The Dick Tracy Show (1961–1962)
- Dilbert (1999–2000)
- The Drinky Crow Show (2008–2009)
- Fabulous Funnies (1978)
- Flash Gordon
  - 1979 series
  - 1996 series
- Fred Basset (UK, 1976)
- Free For All (2003)
- Garfield
  - Garfield and Friends (1988–1994)
  - The Garfield Show (2008–2015)
  - Garfield (2026–present)
- Heathcliff
  - 1980 series (a.k.a. Heathcliff and Marmaduke and before Heathcliff and Dingbat)
  - 1984 series (a.k.a. Heathcliff and The Catillac Cats)
- Iggy Arbuckle (2007)
- Kid Cosmic (2021)
- The Legend of Prince Valiant (1991)
- Little Lulu
  - Little Lulu and Her Little Friends (1976–1977)
  - The Little Lulu Show (1995–1999)
- Mafalda (Argentina, 1972)
- Mafalda (Argentina, 1993)
- Max and the Midknights (2024–2026)
- McDull and Chinese Culture (2006)
- Moomin (1990–1992)
- Mother Goose and Grimm (1991–1992)
- Motu Patlu (2012–present)
- The New Shmoo (1979–1980) – Series featuring a character from the comic strip Li'l Abner.
- Nick Knatterton (1978)
- The Nutty Boy (Brazil, 2022)
- Ox Tales (1987–1988)
- Peanuts
  - The Charlie Brown and Snoopy Show (1983)
  - This Is America, Charlie Brown (1988–1989)
  - Peanuts (2016)
  - Snoopy in Space (2019)
  - The Snoopy Show (2021–2023)
  - Camp Snoopy (2024–2026)
- Pelswick (2000–2002)
- Phantom 2040 (1994–1996)
- Popeye
  - Popeye (1960–1963)
  - Popeye and Friends (1976–1988)
  - The All-New Popeye Hour (1978–1983)
  - Popeye and Son (1987–1988)
  - The Popeye Show (2001)
- Quads (2001–2002)
- Ronaldinho Gaucho's Team (Brazil, 2011)
- Rupert Bear
  - The Adventures of Rupert Bear (UK, 1970–1977)
  - Rupert (UK, 1991–1997)
  - Rupert Bear, Follow the Magic... (UK, 2006–2008)

== See also ==
- List of television programs based on comics
- List of comic-based television episodes directed by women
- List of films based on comics
- List of films based on comic strips
- List of films based on radio series
- List of comics based on television programs
- List of Peanuts specials
