= List of programs broadcast by MeTV Toons =

Wikimedia list article

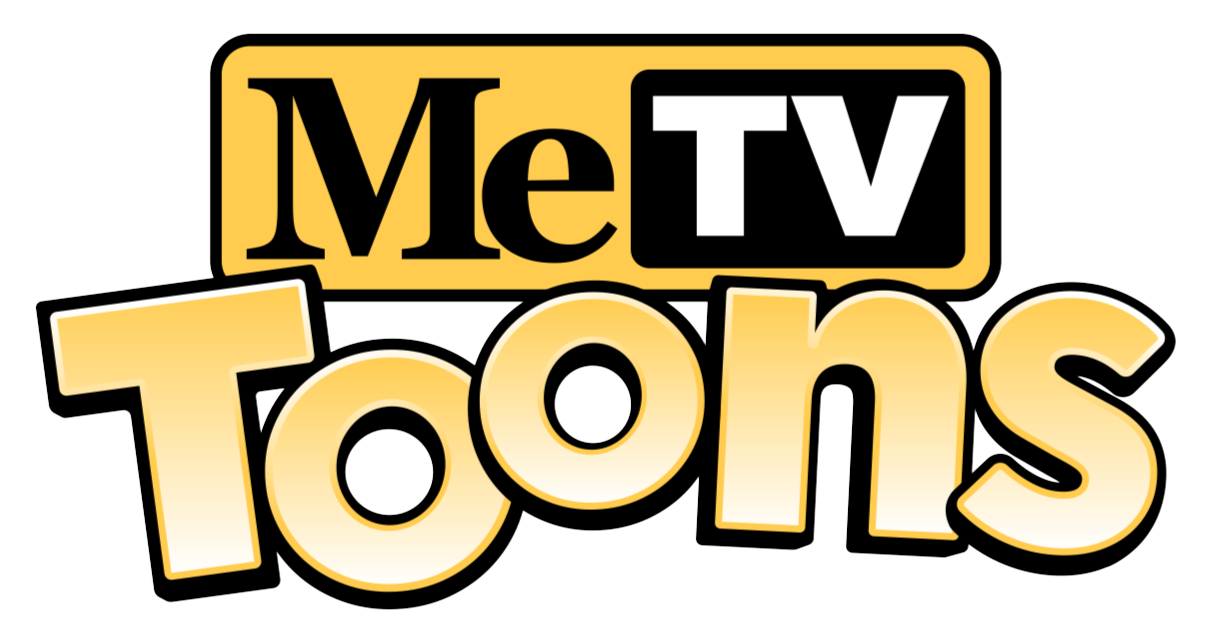
Logo used by MeTV Toons since June 25, 2024

The following is a list of programs broadcast on MeTV Toons, a classic cartoon television network carried on digital subchannels of over-the-air broadcast stations, live streaming, satellite TV, and cable TV in the United States. Reruns of Looney Tunes, Tom and Jerry, Popeye, and The Woody Woodpecker Show.

== Current programming ==
=== Original programming ===
Title	Premiere date	Current season	Note(s)
Toon In with Me	June 25, 2024	5	

=== Repeats of ended programming ===
Title	Premiere date	Finale date	Date(s) reruns
Looney Tunes	April 19, 1930 (not part of MeTV Toons)	September 20, 1969	2024- present
Popeye	1933	1959	2024- present
The Tom & Jerry Show	February 10, 1940 (not part of MeTV Toons)	August 1, 1958	2024- present
The Woody Woodpecker Show	July 7, 1941	September 1, 1972	2024- present
Mighty Mouse and Friends	October 16, 1942	December 31, 1961	2025- present
Casper the Friendly Ghost	November 16, 1945	July 31, 1959	2024- present
House of Hanna Barbera (includes Yogi Bear, Huckleberry Hound, Magilla Gorilla, and More.)	September 29, 1958	1969	2025- present
The Flintstones	September 1, 1960	April 30, 1966	2024- present
The Yogi Bear Show	January 30, 1961	January 6, 1962	2024-25, 2025- present
The Jetsons	September 23, 1962	November 12, 1987	2024- present

=== New shows ===
Title	Premiere date	Finale Date	Note(s)
Mighty Mouse	November 2, 2025	TBA	
Taz-Mania	November 16, 2025 (Original Premiere date on February 2, 2026)	TBA	
Moby Dick and Mighty Mightor	February 7, 2026	TBA	
The New Space Ghost and Herculoids Show	February 7, 2026	TBA	
Legion of Super-Heroes	February 7, 2026	TBA	
Krypto the Superdog (TV series)	February 7, 2026	June 13, 2026	
Speed Buggy	February 15, 2026	TBA	
Help!... It's the Hair Bear Bunch!	February 15, 2026	TBA	
The Super Mario Bros. Super Show!	March 30, 2026	TBA	
Droopy, Master Detective	June 13, 2026 (Original premiere date on June 20, 2026)	November 6, 2026 (part of Cartoon Carousel)	
Hong Kong Phooey	June 13, 2026 (Original premiere date on June 20, 2026)	TBA	
Sonic the Hedgehog	September 21, 2026	TBA	
Cartoon Carousel	September 21, 2026	TBA	
The Woody Woodpecker and Casper Hour	September 21, 2026	TBA	
Heathcliff (1984 TV series)	September 21, 2026	TBA	
The Quick Draw McGraw Show	September 21, 2026	TBA	
Centurions (TV series)	September 22, 2026	TBA	
The Fonz and the Happy Days Gang	September 27, 2026	TBA	
The New Adventures of Gilligan	September 27, 2026	TBA	
Jeannie (TV series)	September 28, 2026	TBA	
The Addams Family	September 28, 2026	TBA	
Animation Antiques	September 28, 2026	TBA	

=== Original programming ===
Title	Premiere date	Finale date	Date(s) reruns	Note(s)
The Adventures of Rocky and Bullwinkle and Friends	June 25, 2024	January 31, 2025	2024-25	
Thunderbirds (TV series)	June 26, 2024	August 6, 2026	2024-26	
Supercar (TV series)	June 26, 2024	September 19, 2026	2024-26	
Captain Scarlet and the Mysterons	June 26, 2024	September 4, 2026	2024-26	
Joe 90	June 26, 2026	July 22, 2026	2024-26	
Fireball XL5	June 26, 2024	September 19, 2026	2024-25	
The Perils of Penelope Pitstop	July 15, 2024	January 14, 2025	2024-25	
The New Fred and Barney Show	July 21, 2024	September 28, 2025	2024-25	
The Flintstone Kids	September 15, 2024	July 6, 2025	2024-25	
The Flintstone Comedy Show	October 13, 2024	October 12, 2025	2024-25	
Cave Kids	November 2, 2024	November 29, 2026	2024-25, 2026	
Frankenstein Jr. and The Impossibles	November 14, 2024	January 14, 2025	2024-25	
Stingray (1964 TV series)	December 31, 2024	September 19, 2026	2024-26	
Heathcliff and Dingbat	January 15, 2025	January 31, 2025	2025	
Heathcliff and Marmaduke	February 3, 2026	June 13, 2026	2025, 2026	
Shaggy & Scooby-Doo Get a Clue!	April 8, 2025	September 2, 2025	2026	
Where's Huddles?	September 22, 2025	February 2, 2026	2025-26	
Krypto the Superdog (TV series)	February 7, 2026	June 13, 2026	2026	
Captain N and the New Super Mario World	December 6, 2026	December 6, 2026	2026	

=== Upcoming Shows ===
Title	Premiere date	Note(s)
TBA	TBA	
TBA	TBA	
TBA	TBA	

== See also ==
- MeTV Toons
