= Heathcliff: The Movie =

1986 animated film directed by Bruno Bianchi

- Theatrical release poster
- Directed by: Bruno Bianchi
- Written by: Alan Swayze
- Based on: Heathcliff by; George Gately; The Catillac Cats by; Jean Chalopin; Bruno Bianchi
- Produced by: Jean Chalopin; Andy Heyward; Tetsuo Katayama
- Starring: Mel Blanc; Donna Christie; Jeannie Elias; Peter Cullen
- Music by: Shuki Levy; Haim Saban
- Production company: DIC Audiovisuel
- Distributed by: Atlantic Releasing (Clubhouse Pictures)
- Release dates: January 17, 1986 (United States); July 18, 1990 (Canada); July 10, 1991 (France)
- Running time: 70 minutes
- Countries: France; United States; Canada
- Language: English
- Box office: $2.6 million

Heathcliff: The Movie is a 1986 animated anthology children's comedy film produced by DIC Audiovisuel and released by Atlantic Releasing under their Clubhouse Pictures label.

== Plot ==
During a rainy day, Heathcliff recalls a number of past exploits to his three nephews (and a mouse), through a compilation of episodes originally broadcast on the TV series.

Stories

1. "Cat Food for Thought" - Heathcliff becomes a cat food commercial star after getting rid of his competition.
2. "Heathcliff's Double" - There's a new cat in the neighborhood called Henry who looks exactly like Heathcliff, and everybody mistakes him for Heathcliff.
3. "The Siamese Twins" - Two new cats in town are ruining Heathcliff's reputation, making everyone think Heathcliff is the cause of their troubles.
4. "An Officer and an Alley Cat" - In a loose parody of An Officer and a Gentleman, Heathcliff goes to obedience school in order to qualify for a contest where the first prize is a lifetime supply of cat food.
5. "The Catfather" - In this parody of The Godfather, Heathcliff collects gifts for the Catfather, oblivious to the fact that the Catfather is the scare of the town.
6. "Boom Boom Pussini" - Hector gets Heathcliff into a challenge to oppose famous cat wrestler Boom Boom Pussini, who cheats to win matches.
7. "Pop on Parole" - Heathcliff's con artist father has gotten parole, but Heathcliff believes he broke out and the cops are chasing him.

After Heathcliff is finished, his nephews angrily throw him out of the house. Heathcliff laughs, "Those are my boys!".

== Voice cast ==
- Mel Blanc as Heathcliff
- Donna Christie as Iggy (5 segments)
- Jeannie Elias as Marcy (segment "An Officer and an Alley Cat")
- Peter Cullen as Pop (segment "Pop on Parole")
- Stanley Jones as Wordsworth (3 segments)
- Marilyn Lightstone as Sonja (4 segments), Mrs. Nutmeg (segment "Pop on Parole")
- Danny Mann as Hector (5 segments), Mr. Schultz (segment "The Siamese Twins")
- Derek McGrath as Lefty (segment "Pop on Parole"), Knuckles (segment "Pop on Parole"), Muggsy (segment "Heathcliff's Double"), Spike, Mr. Woodley (segment "An Officer and an Alley Cat")
- Marilyn Schreffler as Mr. Woodley's Secretary (segment "An Officer and an Alley Cat")
- Danny Wells as General (segment "An Officer and an Alley Cat") and Announcer (segment "Cat Food for Thought")
- Ted Zeigler as Mr. Nutmeg (3 segments), Mungo (3 segments)

== Release ==
The film was released theatrically on January 17, 1986, by Clubhouse Pictures. The film was released on DVD on May 25, 2004 by Sterling Entertainment Group.

=== Box office ===
Heathcliff: The Movie grossed $508,305 on its opening weekend and grossed $2,610,686 domestically by the end of its run. It is the 8th highest grossing G-rated film of 1986.

=== Reception ===
Caryn James of The New York Times stated that the film is "harmless", but thought that the children will be bored with this film. James also criticized the animation, the lip sync on the human characters, and the character of Heathcliff.

== See also ==
- List of animated feature-length films
- List of package films
