= Michael Gallagher (writer) =

American writer (born 1951)

- Born: November 15, 1951 (age 74); New York
- Occupation: Writer
- Relatives: John Gallagher (father); George Gately (uncle)
- Writing career
- Genres: Comic books, satire
- Notable works: Mad; Sonic the Hedgehog

Michael Gallagher (born November 15, 1951 in Manhattan, New York) is an American comic book/humor writer and cartoonist who has contributed to many comic books, newspaper strips, as well as to the satire magazine Mad and other publications. He is the son of cartoonist John Gallagher, as well as the nephew of George Gately, creator of the comic strip Heathcliff. which is currently produced by Michael’s cousin, Peter Gallagher.

== Career ==
Michael’s comic book career began in the mid-80s with Marvel Comics' STAR line of children’s comics. Under Editor Sid Jacobson, Gallagher wrote many stories for various children’s comics titles, such as Mighty Mouse, Madballs, Count Duckula, Flintstone Kids, Danger Mouse, Heathcliff, Care Bears, Foofur and his three year run on ALF, writing 99% of the stories for 50 issues and 6 “annual” sized specials, with the majority of the artwork penciled by Gallagher’s long-time collaborator, Dave Manak and inked by Marie Severin.

At Archie Comics, working with Editor Victor Gorelick, Michael wrote over 100 cover gags for the various Archie titles, uncredited as was/is their policy. In addition, he wrote stories for those same comic books, most often the Veronica and Betty titles. Gallagher wrote the last few issues of Sabrina the Teenage Witch which then became Sabrina, based on the animated TV show. That title lasted three years and he wrote the majority of stories and many covers for it. Gallagher also wrote the Archie newspaper strip for about a year, with art by Dan DeCarlo. But Michael’s most prominent work for Archie was writing the first several issues of Sonic the Hedgehog. Gallagher’s early issues of Sonic were written when the title was in its earlier, more slapstick years, but he continued to write and occasionally pencil stories after Sonic transitioned into an episodic adventure book. Gallagher also created and wrote Off-Panel, the meta-feature that appeared on the letters page of Sonic and Knuckles comic books.

During this time, Gallagher was hired to write stories for other companies, including DC Comics when they published a Looney Tunes Bugs Bunny oversized comic book. For Harvey Comics,' he wrote several New Kids on the Block comics plus a 3-issue limited series starring Little Dracula. He also wrote for Acclaim Comics, who briefly launched a line of “digest sized” comics featuring characters from Walt Disney’s classic animated movies, scripting new adventures for The Little Mermaid, The Hunchback of Notre Dame, Aladdin and more. Other projects for independent publishers included one-shot comics such as The E.V. Warriors (super-heroes who promoted an early version of the electric bicycle,) a comic book biography of Yogi Berra and one featuring Jackie Robinson, distributed on the 50th anniversary of his breaking Major League Baseball’s color barrier.

Back at Marvel, Gallagher entered the super-hero genre in 1992 with an issue of What If... featuring Spider-Man, which led to his being hired by Editor Craig Anderson to take over the writing of Guardians of the Galaxy when Jim Valentino left the title. Starting with issue #29 and continuing until the book was canceled with issue #62, Michael worked primarily with penciler Kevin West and inker Steve Montano, also producing two annuals (one with art by Colleen Doran) and a 4-issue mini-series, Galactic Guardians. Gallagher commented on his three-year run on Guardians as such: "It was very cool to have the 'past' Marvel Universe to play with in such a unique way and bend it to my will, and Kevin [West]'s pencils were to die for. But the characters you inherit arrive with personalities, powers, and quirks which must (and should) continue. And in this case, several vital subplots and storylines were still in progress." After that, Michael continued to do work for various Marvel editors, writing stories featuring Impossible Man, Thor, Hulk, Daredevil and Jack of Hearts. Gallagher bookended his super-hero phase at Marvel by writing a series of satirical features in another five-issue iteration of What If? in 2010, edited by Justin Gabrie. One issue focused on the events in “World War Hulk” and Michael wrote the back-up story with art by Patrick Spaziante.

Beginning in early 1996 with issue #343, Gallagher began selling regularly to MAD Magazine and continued to do so until the final (New York) issue #550 in 2018. He wrote many single, double and triple page articles as well as front and back covers, about a dozen Spy vs. Spy episodes, in-house advertising and even drew a “USPS Periodical Wrapper” that was mailed to MAD subscribers. During that time, Michael had his ideas drawn by many of MAD’s renowned artists; Mort Drucker, Sergio Aragones, Paul Coker, Joe DeVito, Paul Kuper, Hermann Mejia, Hilary Barta, Ray Alma, John Caldwell, Amanda Conner, Scott Bricher, Dave Manak, Chuck Frasier, James Warhola, Monte Wolverton, photographer Irving Schild and most of all Tom Bunk, who drew Gallagher’s “grossest” articles, including the often reprinted “The Zit.”

== Personal life ==
Gallagher has contributed pro bono character designs and publicity art to Humane Society causes in New Jersey, North Carolina, Florida and Arizona as well as other charities. His artwork has also been on display at hospitals, most notably Temple University Children’s Medical Center in Philadelphia. With Sid Jacobson doing the writing, Michael drew a monthly four-tiered, full page cartoon feature in the digest sized Cable Guide, starring the characters from the popular NICKELODEON show, You Can’t Do That On Television. He also wrote briefly for CRACKED Magazine under a pseudonym and has been a ghost writer for several cartoon strips. Like many freelance writer/cartoonists, Gallagher has created and tried to sell quite a few comic strip ideas, graphic novel and comic book proposals over the years, but with no success.

Gallagher has used his creative abilities for television production and promotion with positions at WTVX, a CBS Affiliate in Florida and WNJN, Public Television for New Jersey. Michael also performed with a radio comedy troupe, “Pliskin’s Players” on NPR. In addition, he has designed many playbook covers and posters for playwright Luigi Jannuzzi as well as other regional theatre groups Gallagher has been involved with as an actor, writer and director.

Michael has taught summer “cartoon camps,” lectured at schools (K – college), libraries, art fairs, career days and civic organizations. He occasionally appears at comic book shops and conventions. Since 2010, Gallagher has been creating “strange & surreal” paintings which can be seen on his website, michaelgallagherart.com. Michael’s “archive” resides (along with his father’s) at the Billy Ireland Cartoon Library and Museum on the campus of Ohio State University in Columbus, Ohio.

== Bibliography ==
=== Archie Comics ===
- Archie (Vol. 1) #483
- Archie & Friends #65
- Betty #1-2
- Betty and Me #199-200
- Betty and Veronica #135
- Knuckles the Echidna #31
- Sabrina #1-37
- Sabrina the Teenage Witch (Vol. 1) #25-32
- Sabrina the Teenage Witch (Vol. 2) #38
- Sonic & Knuckles: Mecha Madness #1
- Sonic Blast
- Sonic Quest #1–3
- Sonic Super Special #3-6, 9-10, 11-13 (Off Panel), 15
- Sonic the Hedgehog Miniseries #0–3
- Sonic the Hedgehog (Archie) #1-6, 8-9, 11-12, 25, 27-28, 31-33, 35, 39-40, 50, 59, 67-88 (Off Panel), 92-93 (Off Panel), 103-105, 126-127, 138, 147 ("Off-Panel: This Side of Parodies"), 155-156, 158 ("Off-Panel: Insider Treading"), 160 (Off Panel), 170, 185
- Super Sonic vs. Hyper Knuckles #1
- Tails Miniseries #1–3
- Veronica #21-25

=== DC Comics ===
- MAD #345, 407, 414, 418, 505, 509, 547, 550

=== Marvel Comics ===
- ALF #1-50
- ALF* Annual #1-3
- ALF* Spring Special
- ALF Holiday Special #1-2
- Care Bears #10-18
- Cosmic Powers Unlimited #3
- Count Duckula #1-13
- Foofur #1-3, 5
- Galactic Guardians #1-4
- Guardians of the Galaxy (Vol. 1) #29-62
- Guardians of the Galaxy Annual (Vol. 1) #3-4
- Heathcliff #2-3, 5-7, 9, 11, 14-21, 23, 29-30, 35, 43
- Heathcliff Annual
- Madballs #1-10
- Marvel Comics Presents #91
- Mighty Mouse #1-5, 7-9
- The Flintstone Kids #1-7
- The Impossible Man Summer Vacation Spectacular #1-2
- What If...? (Vol. 2) #42
- What If? Astonishing X-Men (SAY WHAT? comedy strip)
- What If? Daredevil vs. Elektra (SAY WHAT? comedy strip)
- What If? Secret Invasion (SAY WHAT? comedy strip)
- What If? Spider-Man House of M (SAY WHAT? comedy strip)
- What If? World War Hulk (SAY WHAT? comedy strip)

=== Harvey Comics ===
- Beetlejuice Horror Day Special #1
- Beetlejuice In The Neitherworld #1
- Stunt Dawgs #1
- Wendy and The New Kids On The Block #1-7

=== Other publishers ===
- Rex: Zombie Killer #1 (Big Dog Ink)
