= John Gallagher (cartoonist) =

American cartoonist and illustrator

- Born: John Joseph Gallagher; January 24, 1926; Englewood, New Jersey, U.S.
- Died: March 17, 2005 (aged 79); U.S.
- Occupations: Cartoonist, illustrator
- Known for: Winning the National Cartoonist Society Gag Cartoon Award twice
- Children: Michael Gallagher
- Relatives: George Gately (brother)

John Joseph Gallagher (1926–2005) was an American cartoonist and illustrator. He contributed to most major magazines in the 1950s and 1960s, signing his work “Gallagher.” He won the National Cartoonist Society Gag Cartoon Award in 1957 and 1971.

== Early life ==
John Joseph Gallagher was born January 24, 1926, in Englewood, New Jersey. His parents were George and Gertrude Gallagher. He was the eldest of three children. One brother was Gerald, who became an attorney and the other was George “Gately” Gallagher who created the comic strip Heathcliff.

Gallagher’s father, renowned for his sense of humor, was a longshoreman who had always wished to be a cartoonist. He and his wife encouraged John’s and George’s artwork. John Gallagher began drawing Mickey Mouse and Popeye at the age of three. After John and George became professional cartoonists, their father clipped hundreds of cartoons from magazines and glued them in spiral bound notebooks for their reference.

John grew up in Bergenfield, New Jersey and graduated from Bergenfield High School in 1944. He drew cartoons for “The B Hive”, the school newspaper, as well as the school yearbook, “Crossroads.” After he graduated high school, John went into the Navy. He served as a Signalman aboard a destroyer escort which was en route to invade Japan when the war ended.

John attended Syracuse University School of Art on the G.I. Bill. While attending Syracuse, he did illustrations and cartoons for “The Syracusan” the university magazine. It was there he met cartoonist Brad (Marmaduke) Anderson, who became his lifelong friend. Anderson showed him how to put together cartoons for submission to magazines. After two years, John transferred to Pratt Institute, majoring in Illustration.

== Career ==
In 1951, his senior year at Pratt, John sold his first cartoon to The Saturday Evening Post. In January 1951, he married Dorothy “Dot” Lotter, whom he first met while in grammar school. After his graduation from Pratt, they moved to New York City where he became a staff artist for the Howell-Rojin Agency, which helped pioneer TV “green screen” technology, still used today by TV news weathermen. At this time, he began to submit cartoons regularly. When his freelance career began to take off, he and his wife moved back to Bergenfield, New Jersey.

For the next 20 years, Gallagher enjoyed a gag cartoon freelancing career. His cartoons appeared in magazines such as The Saturday Evening Post, Collier’s, American Legion Magazine, Sport, Military Life, True, Golf, Argosy, Parade, 1000 Jokes Magazine, For Laughing Out Loud, Saga and Boys’ Life. He reportedly said his best work appeared in 1000 Jokes Magazine.

In the late 1960s he created a regular feature for Boys’ Life called “The Cartoon Bug.” Aspiring young cartoonists submitted their best work and Gallagher critiqued their work and published it with succinct comments on the art of cartooning. They received $25 for their efforts. After the feature ran its course in Boys’ Life it was syndicated, appearing biweekly in newspapers in the United States and Canada.

When the magazine cartoon markets began to dry up in the late 1960s, John left freelancing and became Art Director for American Kitchen Foods, where he designed packaging and promotional material for their new frozen French fry products, including “Tasti Fries.” Later, he drew more than a hundred oversized industrial safety posters for Marlin Industries, where his cartoonist friend Herb Green was Art Director. During this period, he also began a long association with fellow cartoonist Bob Weber, supplying gags for his syndicated comic strip, Moose.

When his brother, George Gately, launched his syndicated newspaper comic panel, Heathcliff (McNaught/Creator’s Syndicate), in 1973, Gallagher became involved in all creative aspects of the feature. He was Heathcliff’s primary gagwriter and layout penciler until shortly before his death. Today, the comic strip is drawn by their nephew, Peter Gallagher.

He received the National Cartoonist Society Gag Cartoon Award for 1957 and 1971 for his work.

== Later life and death ==
John Gallagher died at age 79 on March 17, 2005, of complications from emphysema. His papers have been donated to The Billy Ireland Cartoon Library and Museum in Columbus, Ohio.

== Bibliography ==
Too Funny for Words: A Book for People Who Can’t Read by Bill Yates Dell Publishing (1954)

Let’s go to Bedlam by Charles Preston Shelley Publishing (1954)

Best Cartoons of the Year by Lawrence Lariar Crown Publishers (1955, 1956, 1958 – 1960–1964, 1968)

Forever Funny by Bill Yates First Edition 93 Dell Publishing (1956)

Hits, Runs and Social Errors: Cartoons from Sports Illustrated by Charles Preston Random House (1956)

One Moment Sir by John Bailey E.P. Dutton (1957)

The Saturday Evening Post Cartoon Festival by Marione R. Nickles E. P. Dutton (1958)

The True Album of Cartoons, Crown Publishers (1960)

Best of the Best Cartoons by Lawrence Lariar Crown (1961)

Still Too Funny For Words by Bill Yates Dell Publishing Co. (1964)

The Classic Cartoons by William Cole & Mike Thaler, World Publishing Company (1966)

Modern Times by Charles Preston, E.P. Dutton (1968)

True Cartoon Parade, Fawcett Publications (1969)

The Fireside Book of Baseball Volumes I – III by Charles Einstein, Simon & Schuster (1956, 1958, 1968)
