= Leora Thatcher =

American actress

- Born: May 12, 1894; Logan, Utah, U.S.
- Died: March 5, 1984 (aged 89); Salt Lake City, Utah, U.S.
- Education: University of Utah
- Occupations: Actress, teacher

Leora Thatcher (May 12, 1894 – March 5, 1984) was an American actress on stage, film, and television, and a teacher.

== Early years ==
Thatcher was born in Logan, Utah, on May 12, 1894, the daughter of Sarah Catherine Hopkins and Moses Thatcher, Jr. She had a brother and two sisters. She attended Brigham Young College, Utah State Agricultural College, and the University of Utah (UU), from which she graduated in 1921. At UU, she studied speech and theater under Maud May Babcock. She taught speech at Logan High School for two years before she became an actress.

== Career ==
Thatcher's career began with her acting with the KSL Players in Utah. She joined the Moroni Olsen Players in 1923 and spent eight years performing with that touring repertory company. For eight years she played Ada Jester in Tobacco Road on Broadway, after which she continued in that role in the play's touring company. Her other Broadway credits included One Bright Day (1952), The Male Animal (1952), The Children's Hour (1952), The Music Man (1957), and J.B. (1958),

Films in which Thatcher appeared included Counsel for Crime (1937), Theodora Goes Wild (1936), and a series of comedies starring Andy Clyde. On radio, Thatcher portrayed Marge Mulvaney on Lora Lawton and Mrs. Kramer on The Right to Happiness and was a supporting player on The Mel Blanc Show. She also was heard on Aunt Jenny's Stories, Ellen Randolph, Good Neighbors, and Second Husband, and she directed some radio programs. Television programs on which Thatcher appeared included I Remember Mama, Kraft Theatre, NBC Matinee Theater, Robert Montgomery Presents, and Studio One.

In 1943, while her parents were ill, Thatcher taught a play production class at USAC.

Thatcher was inducted into the Pioneer State Theatre Hall of Fame in 1976.

== Death ==
Thatcher died on March 5, 1984, in Salt Lake City, aged 89.

== Photographs ==
The Leora Thatcher Photograph Collection is housed at the Utah State Historical Society in Salt Lake City, Utah. It contains 36 photographs, most of which are of Thatcher and her relatives.
