= The Mel Blanc Show =

1946-1947 radio situation comedy

- Other names: The Fix-It Shop; Mel Blanc's Fix-It Shop
- Genre: Situation comedy
- Running time: 30 minutes
- Country of origin: United States
- Language: English
- Syndicates: CBS
- Starring: Mel Blanc
- Written by: David Victor; Herb Little; Mac Benoff
- Directed by: Sam Fuller; Joe Rines
- Produced by: Joe Rines
- Original release: September 3, 1946 – June 24, 1947
- Sponsored by: Colgate

The Mel Blanc Show was a radio situation comedy in the United States. It was broadcast on CBS from September 3, 1946 to June 24, 1947.

== Format ==
Although Mel Blanc "did countless character impersonations on other radio programs, as well as being the voice of many cartoon characters," he used his natural voice in this program and played himself – except that instead of being an entertainer, the Mel Blanc character in the show was "the bumbling owner of a fix-it shop that was never able to fix anything." The show's one regular outlet for another Blanc voice was the character Zookie, a stuttering helper. One website noted, however, "Many episodes required Mel to impersonate an exotic foreigner or other stranger in town, ostensibly for carrying out a minor deception on his girlfriend's father, but of course simply as a vehicle for him to show off his talents."

The June 1947 issue of Radio Mirror magazine provided an insight into the program with this comment in its Recommended Listening column under "Tuesday night": "At 8:30, you'll have to make a choice between the Mel Blanc Show (CBS) and Date with Judy (NBC). If it's impossible-situations-made-to-seem-real that you like, you'll choose Mel and his girl and his fix-it shop".

One old-time radio website commented, "Mel Blanc's natural – and exceptional – voice talent was unquestionably the series' greatest selling factor; and Mel got to show his acting and timing chops to a far greater degree with his own situation comedy."

A signature expression of the program was "ugga-ugga-boo, ugga-boo-boo-ugga," the password for Blanc's (the character's) lodge, the Benevolent Order of Loyal Zebras. Other recurring catchphrases included Mr. Colby's threat to Mel, "I'll break every bone in your body!" and Mr. Cushing's weepy "But I don't know why I'm telling you all this; it's just that I've got no one to talk to!"

== Characters and cast ==
The Mel Blanc Show featured several veteran actors of old-time radio in addition to Blanc as himself and Zookie. The regular characters and actors were as follows:

Character	Actor/actress
Betty Colby (Mel's girlfriend)	Mary Jane Croft
Mr. Colby (Betty's father)	Joseph Kearns
Mr. Cushing (lodge president)	Hans Conried
Mr. Potchnik (piano teacher)	Alan Reed
Mrs. Longneck (rich socialite)	Bea Benaderet

Others who often appeared in the program were Leora Thatcher, Earle Ross, Jerry Hausner, Elvia Allman, and Sandra Gould. The announcer was John "Bud" Hiestand. Victor Miller and his orchestra were the musicians.

== Limited success ==
A review in the trade publication Billboard seemed to portend the program's demise. The review focused on the April 1, 1947, episode, commenting:

After more than five months ... the Mel Blanc program still seems to be groping. Probably most responsible for its failure to come anywhere near the show-type average, or to top programs aired opposite, is the scripting, the production contributing to a lesser extent. Writers seem to have been misled by Blanc's vocal versatility into trying to introduce too many odd characters ...

After citing a number of specific examples, the reviewer concluded:

Blanc still has great potential [sic]. If Colgate [the sponsor], Sherman-Marquette [the advertising agency] or the writers can find the right formula, plus a production with pace, the show will get the cohesion it lacks now. As it stands, it'll take a lot of doing to edge the Hooper higher.

Less than two months later, the same publication announced the end of The Mel Blanc Show. Billboard's May 24, 1947, issue contained a story that reported, "Fate of the Mel Blanc show has reportedly been sealed by bank-roller Colgate-Palmolive Peet, who is understood to have ordered the show dropped at end of the current cycle, June 24." The story briefly referred to "a general retrenchment program now being mulled" by the company.

The Digital Deli Too website cited another factor in the program's fate as follows:

There's no question that Blanc's truest fans would have loved simply 25 minutes of Mel Blanc reading a telephone book in various dialects. But that's not how CBS and Colgate billed The Mel Blanc Show; it was promoted as a situation comedy-variety show, competing with at least twelve other similar situation comedy-variety programs of the era--many of them very highly rated.

The program did, indeed, end its run June 24, 1947.
