= Mel Blanc =

American voice actor and radio personality (1908–1989)

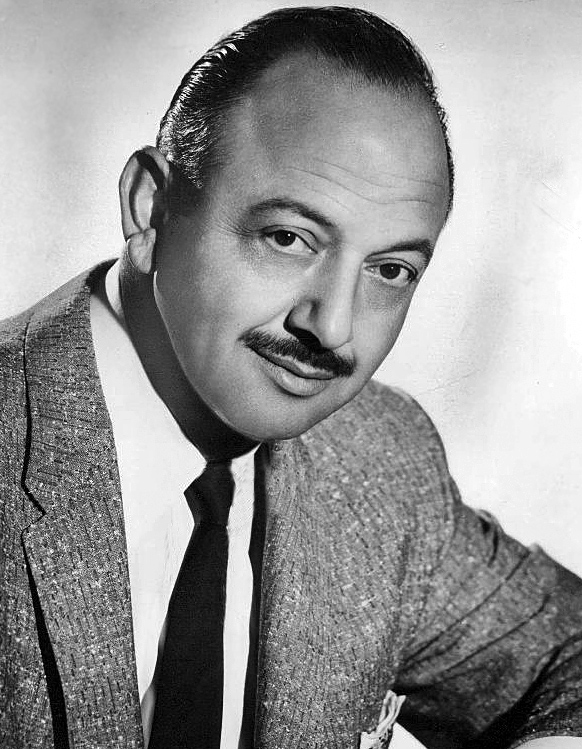
- Blanc in 1959
- Born: Melvin Jerome Blank; May 30, 1908; San Francisco, California, US
- Died: July 10, 1989 (aged 81); Los Angeles, California, US
- Burial place: Hollywood Forever Cemetery
- Other name: "The Man of 1,000 Voices"
- Occupations: Voice actor; radio personality
- Years active: 1927–1989
- Spouse: Estelle Rosenbaum (m. 1933)
- Children: Noel Blanc
- Awards: Inkpot Award (1976)

Melvin Jerome Blanc (né Blank /blæŋk/; May 30, 1908 – July 10, 1989) was an American voice actor and radio personality whose career spanned over sixty years. Referred to as "The Man of a Thousand Voices", he is widely regarded as the greatest and most influential voice actor of all time. Blanc provided many voices for Looney Tunes and Merrie Melodies cartoons released by Warner Bros. during the golden age of American animation.

Blanc began his career during the Golden Age of Radio when he provided character voices and vocal sound effects for comedy radio programs, including those of Jack Benny, Abbott and Costello, Burns and Allen, The Great Gildersleeve, Judy Canova and his own short-lived sitcom. He later expanded to animation, providing the voices of Bugs Bunny, Daffy Duck, Tweety, Sylvester the Cat, Yosemite Sam, Foghorn Leghorn, Marvin the Martian, Pepé Le Pew, Speedy Gonzales, Wile E. Coyote, the Tasmanian Devil, and numerous other characters from the Looney Tunes and Merrie Melodies theatrical cartoons. Blanc also voiced the characters Porky Pig and Elmer Fudd after replacing their respective original performers, Joe Dougherty and Arthur Q. Bryan, although he occasionally voiced Elmer during Bryan's lifetime as well.

Blanc later voiced characters for Hanna-Barbera's television cartoons, including: Barney Rubble and Dino on The Flintstones, Mr. Spacely on The Jetsons, Secret Squirrel on The Atom Ant/Secret Squirrel Show, the title character of Speed Buggy, and Captain Caveman on Captain Caveman and the Teen Angels and The Flintstone Kids. He was also the voice of Gideon's hiccups in Pinocchio, one of his two appearances at Disney. Blanc was also the voice of Woody Woodpecker in the first four animated shorts from 1940 to 1941, his only appearance at Universal Pictures. He also provided the vocal effects for Tom and Jerry in the short films from 1963 to 1967, in 34 short films directed by Chuck Jones, and voiced Heathcliff in Heathcliff and the Catillac Cats.

== Early life ==
Blanc was born on May 30, 1908, in San Francisco, California. His birth name was Melvin Jerome Blank, and his Jewish-American parents were Eva Rivka (born Katz) and Frederick Harvey Blank. Blanc's paternal grandparents, Heinrich Sebastian and Katharine (born Schwarzel), immigrated to Brooklyn from Bavaria in 1860 and 1862, respectively. Eva Katz was born in Vilnius, Lithuania, and immigrated to America with her parents, Nolan Chaim and Laura Golemba Katz, as a child. Blanc also had an older brother, Henry Charles Blank.

He grew up in San Francisco's Western Addition neighborhood, and later in Portland, Oregon, where he attended Lincoln High School. He had an early fondness for voices and dialect, which he began practicing at the age of 10. He claimed that he changed the spelling of his name when he was 16, from Blank to Blanc (meaning White in french), because a teacher told him that he would amount to nothing and be like his name, a "blank". He joined the Order of DeMolay as a young man, and was eventually inducted into its Hall of Fame. After graduating from high school in 1927, he divided his time between leading an orchestra (becoming the youngest conductor in the country at the age of 19) and performing "shtick" in vaudeville shows around Washington, Oregon, and northern California.

== Career ==
=== Radio work ===
Blanc began his radio career at the age of 19 in 1927, when he made his acting debut on the KGW program The Hoot Owls, where his ability to provide voices for multiple characters first attracted attention. He moved to Los Angeles in 1932, where he met Estelle Rosenbaum (1909–2003), whom he married a year later, before returning to Portland. He moved to KEX in 1933 to produce and co-host his Cobweb and Nuts show with his wife Estelle, which debuted on June 15. The program played Monday through Saturday from 11:00 pm to midnight, and by the time the show ended two years later, it appeared from 10:30 pm to 11:00 pm.

Private Snafu

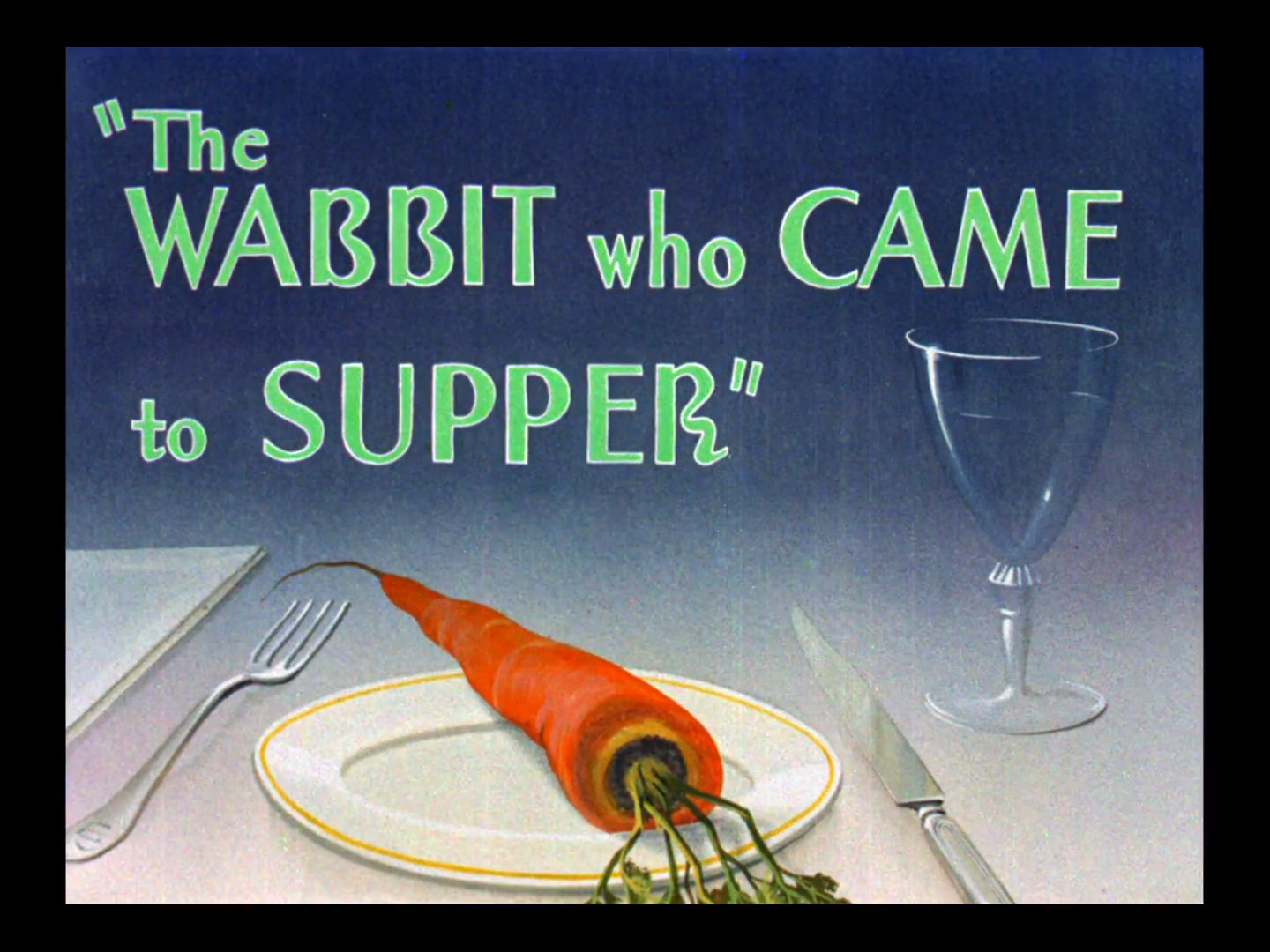
The Wabbit Who Came to Supper

With his wife's encouragement, Blanc returned to Los Angeles and joined Warner Bros.–owned KFWB in Hollywood in 1935. He joined The Johnny Murray Show, but the following year switched to CBS Radio and The Joe Penner Show.

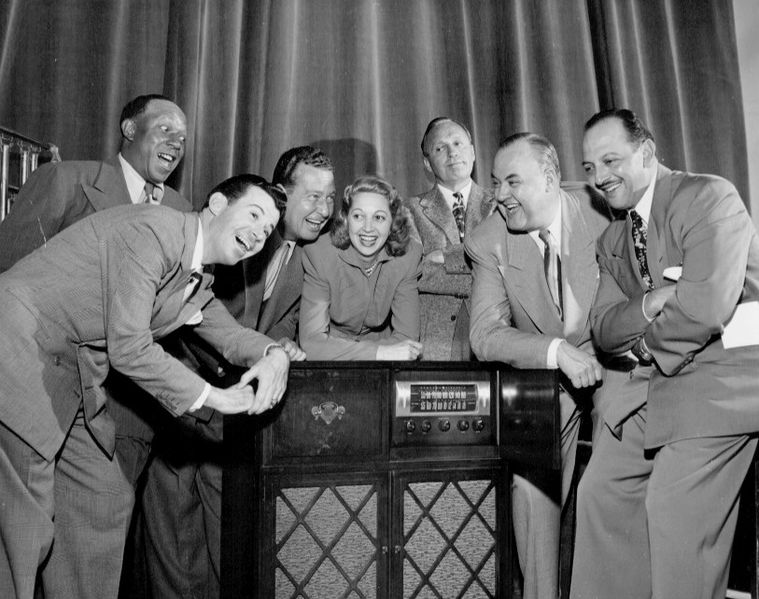
The cast of The Jack Benny Program, from left to right: Eddie "Rochester" Anderson, Dennis Day, Phil Harris, Mary Livingstone, Jack Benny, Don Wilson, and Mel Blanc

Blanc was a regular on the NBC Red Network show The Jack Benny Program in various roles, including voicing Benny's Maxwell automobile (in desperate need of a tune-up), violin teacher Professor LeBlanc, Polly the Parrot, Benny's pet polar bear Carmichael and the train announcer. The first role came from a mishap when the recording of the automobile's sounds failed to play on cue, prompting Blanc to take the microphone and improvise the sounds himself. The audience reacted so positively that Benny decided to dispense with the recording altogether and have Blanc continue in that role. One of Blanc's characters from Benny's radio (and later TV) programs was "Sy, the Little Mexican", who spoke one word at a time. He continued to work with Benny on radio until the series ended in 1955 and followed the program into television from Benny's 1950 debut episode through guest spots on NBC specials in the 1970s.

Radio Daily magazine wrote in 1942 that Blanc "specialize[d] in over fifty-seven voices, dialects, and intricate sound effects", and by 1946, he was appearing on over fifteen programs in various supporting roles. His success on The Jack Benny Program led to his own radio show on the CBS Radio Network, The Mel Blanc Show, which ran from September 3, 1946, to June 24, 1947. Blanc played himself as the hapless owner of a fix-it shop, as well as his young cousin Zookie. Blanc also appeared on such other national radio programs as The Abbott and Costello Show, the Happy Postman on Burns and Allen, and as August Moon on Point Sublime. During World War II, he appeared as Private Sad Sack on various radio shows, including G.I. Journal. Blanc recorded a song titled "Big Bear Lake".

=== Animation voice work during the golden age of Hollywood ===
Private Snafu: Spies, voiced by Blanc in 1943

In December 1936, Mel Blanc joined Leon Schlesinger Productions, which was producing theatrical cartoon shorts for Warner Bros. Pictures. After sound man Treg Brown was put in charge of cartoon voices, and Carl W. Stalling became music director, Brown introduced Blanc to animation directors Tex Avery, Bob Clampett, Friz Freleng, and Frank Tashlin, who loved his voices. The first cartoon Blanc worked on was Picador Porky (1937) as the voice of Porky Pig's drunken friends who dress up as a bull. He soon after received his first starring role when he replaced Joe Dougherty as Porky's voice in Porky's Duck Hunt, which marked the debut of Daffy Duck, also voiced by Blanc.

Following this, Blanc became a very prominent vocal artist for Warner Bros., voicing a wide variety of the Looney Tunes characters. Bugs Bunny, as whom Blanc made his debut in A Wild Hare (1940), was known for eating carrots frequently (especially while saying his catchphrase "Eh, what's up, doc?"). To follow this sound with the animated voice, Blanc would bite into a carrot and then quickly spit into a spittoon. One often-repeated story is that Blanc was allergic to carrots, which Blanc denied.

In Disney's Pinocchio, Blanc was hired to perform the voice of Gideon the Cat. However, it was eventually decided to have Gideon be a mute character (similar to Dopey from Snow White and the Seven Dwarfs), so all of Blanc's recorded dialogue was deleted except for a solitary hiccup, which was heard three times in the finished film.

Blanc also originated the voice and laugh of Woody Woodpecker for the theatrical cartoons produced by Walter Lantz for Universal Pictures, but stopped voicing Woody after the character's first four shorts when he was signed to an exclusive contract with Warner Bros. Blanc had recorded some of Woody's lines for Pantry Panic, but had already left the Lantz studio before the short was released, so Danny Webb was hired to finished Woody's remaining lines for that particular short. Despite this, his laugh was still used in the Woody Woodpecker cartoons until 1951, when Grace Stafford recorded a softer version, while his "Guess who!?" signature line was used in the opening titles until the end of the series and closure of Walter Lantz Productions in 1972.

During World War II, Blanc served as the voice of the hapless Private Snafu in a series of shorts produced by Warner Bros. as a way of training recruited soldiers through the medium of animation.

Throughout his career, Blanc, aware of his talents, protected the rights to his voice characterizations contractually and legally. He, and later his estate, never hesitated to take civil action when those rights were violated. Voice actors at the time rarely received screen credits, but Blanc was an exception; by 1944, his contract with Warner Bros. stipulated a credit reading "Voice characterization(s) by Mel Blanc". According to his autobiography, Blanc asked for and received this screen credit from studio boss Leon Schlesinger after he was denied a salary raise. Initially, Blanc's screen credit was limited only to cartoons in which he voiced Bugs Bunny. This changed in March 1945 when the contract was amended to also include a screen credit for cartoons featuring Porky Pig and/or Daffy Duck. This however, excluded any shorts with the two characters made before that amendment occurred, even if they released after the fact (Book Revue and Baby Bottleneck are both examples of this). By the end of 1946, Blanc began receiving a screen credit in any subsequent Warner Bros. cartoon for which he provided voices.

=== Voice work for Hanna-Barbera and others ===
In 1960, after the expiration of his exclusive contract with Warner Bros., Blanc continued working for them, but also began providing voices for the TV cartoons produced by Hanna-Barbera; his roles during this time included Barney Rubble of The Flintstones and Cosmo Spacely of The Jetsons. His other voice roles for Hanna-Barbera included Dino the Dinosaur, Secret Squirrel, Speed Buggy, and Captain Caveman, as well as voices for Wally Gator and The Perils of Penelope Pitstop.

Blanc also worked with former Looney Tunes director Chuck Jones, who by this time was directing shorts with his own company Sib Tower 12 (later MGM Animation/Visual Arts), doing vocal effects for the Tom and Jerry series from 1963 to 1967. Blanc was the first voice of Toucan Sam in Froot Loops commercials.

Blanc reprised some of his Warner Bros. characters when the studio contracted him to make new theatrical cartoons in the mid- to late 1960s. For these, Blanc voiced Daffy Duck and Speedy Gonzales, the characters who received the most frequent use in these shorts (later, newly introduced characters such as Cool Cat and Merlin the Magic Mouse were voiced by Larry Storch). Blanc also continued to voice the Looney Tunes for the bridging sequences of The Bugs Bunny Show, as well as in numerous animated advertisements and several compilation features, such as The Bugs Bunny/Road Runner Movie (1979). He also voiced Granny on Peter Pan Records in 4 More Adventures of Bugs Bunny (1974) and Holly-Daze (1974), in place of June Foray, and replaced the late Arthur Q. Bryan as Elmer Fudd's voice during the post-golden age era.

=== Car accident and aftermath ===
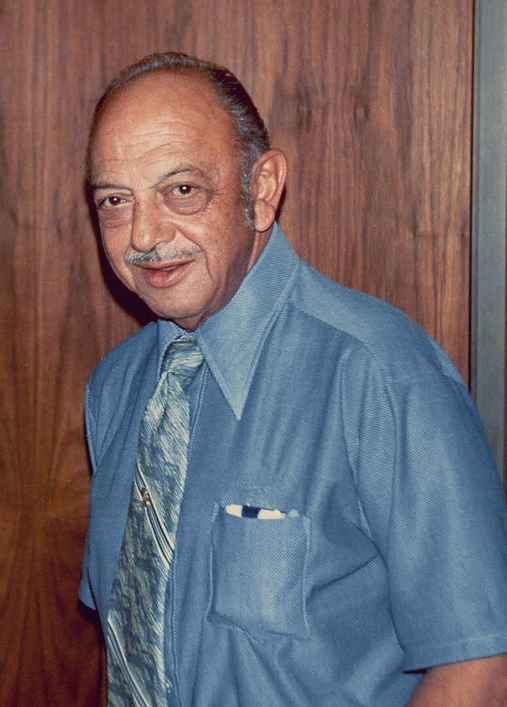
Blanc in 1975

On January 24, 1961, Blanc was driving alone when his sports car was involved in a head-on collision on Sunset Boulevard; his legs and his pelvis were fractured as a result. He was in a coma and completely non-responsive. About two weeks later, one of Blanc's neurologists at the UCLA Medical Center tried a different approach than just trying to address the unconscious Blanc—address his characters instead. Blanc was asked, "How are you feeling today, Bugs Bunny?" After a slight pause, Blanc answered, in a weak voice, "Eh ... just fine, Doc. How are you?" The doctor then asked Tweety if he was there, too. "I tawt I taw a puddy tat", was the reply. Blanc returned home on March 17. Four days later, Blanc filed a US$500,000 lawsuit against the City of Los Angeles. His accident, one of 26 in the preceding two years at the intersection known as Dead Man's Curve, resulted in the city funding the restructuring of curves at the location.

Years later, Blanc's son Noel revealed that he performed some of his father's Warner Bros. characters for some cartoons during his recovery. (Note: Attributed to multiple references:) Warner Bros. had also asked Stan Freberg to provide the voices for Bugs Bunny and Porky Pig, but Freberg declined, out of respect for Blanc. Jerry Hausner briefly filled in for Blanc as Bugs and Yosemite Sam for some commercials and spots for The Bugs Bunny Show and additional lines in Devil's Feud Cake. At the time of the accident, Blanc was also serving as the voice of Barney Rubble in The Flintstones. His absence from the show was relatively brief; Daws Butler provided the voice of Barney for a few episodes, after which the show's producers set up recording equipment in Blanc's hospital room and later at his home to allow him to work from there. Some of the recordings were made while he was in full-body cast as he lay flat on his back with the other Flintstones co-stars gathered around him. Unknown people would arrive at Warner Bros. and Hanna-Barbera and say that they could do Blanc's character voices, but ended up being dismissed. He returned to The Jack Benny Program to film the program's 1961 Christmas show, moving around by crutches and a wheelchair.

=== Later years ===
On January 29, 1962, Mel and his son Noel formed Blanc Communications Corporation, a media company which produced over 5,000 commercials and public service announcements, which remains in operation. Mel and Noel appeared with many stars, including: Kirk Douglas, Lucille Ball, Vincent Price, Phyllis Diller, Liberace and The Who.

In the 1970s, Blanc gave a series of college lectures across the US and appeared in commercials for American Express. In 1972, Chuck McKibben started working as Blanc's personal recording engineer/producer and studio manager. His daily responsibilities at Mel Blanc Audiomedia in Beverly Hills, California included recording Blanc's voice for a variety of film, advertising and theme park projects. In 1982, Mel's production company, Blanc Communications Corporation, collaborated on a special with the Boston-based Shriners' Burns Institute called Ounce of Prevention, which became a 30-minute TV special.

Throughout the late 1970s and 1980s, Blanc performed his Looney Tunes characters for bridging sequences in various compilation films of Golden Age-era Warner Bros. cartoons, such as: The Bugs Bunny/Road Runner Movie, The Looney Looney Looney Bugs Bunny Movie, Bugs Bunny's 3rd Movie: 1001 Rabbit Tales, Daffy Duck's Fantastic Island and Daffy Duck's Quackbusters. His final performance of his Looney Tunes roles was in Bugs Bunny's Wild World of Sports (1989). After spending most of two seasons voicing the diminutive robot Twiki in Buck Rogers in the 25th Century, Blanc's last major original character was Heathcliff, who he voiced from 1980 to 1988.

In the live-action film Strange Brew (1983), Blanc voiced the father of Bob and Doug McKenzie, at the request of comedian Rick Moranis. In the live-action/animated movie Who Framed Roger Rabbit (1988), Blanc reprised several of his roles from Warner Bros. cartoons (Bugs, Daffy, Porky, Tweety, and Sylvester), but left Yosemite Sam to Joe Alaskey (who later became one of Blanc's regular replacements until his death in 2016). The film was one of the few Disney projects in which Blanc was involved. Blanc died just a year after the film's release. His final recording session was for Jetsons: The Movie (1990).

== Personal life ==
Blanc and his wife Estelle Rosenbaum were married on January 4, 1933, and remained married until his death in 1989. Their son and only child, Noel Blanc, was also a voice actor.

Blanc was a Freemason as a member of Mid Day Lodge No. 188 in Portland, Oregon. He held membership at the lodge for 58 years. Blanc was also a Shriner.

== Death ==
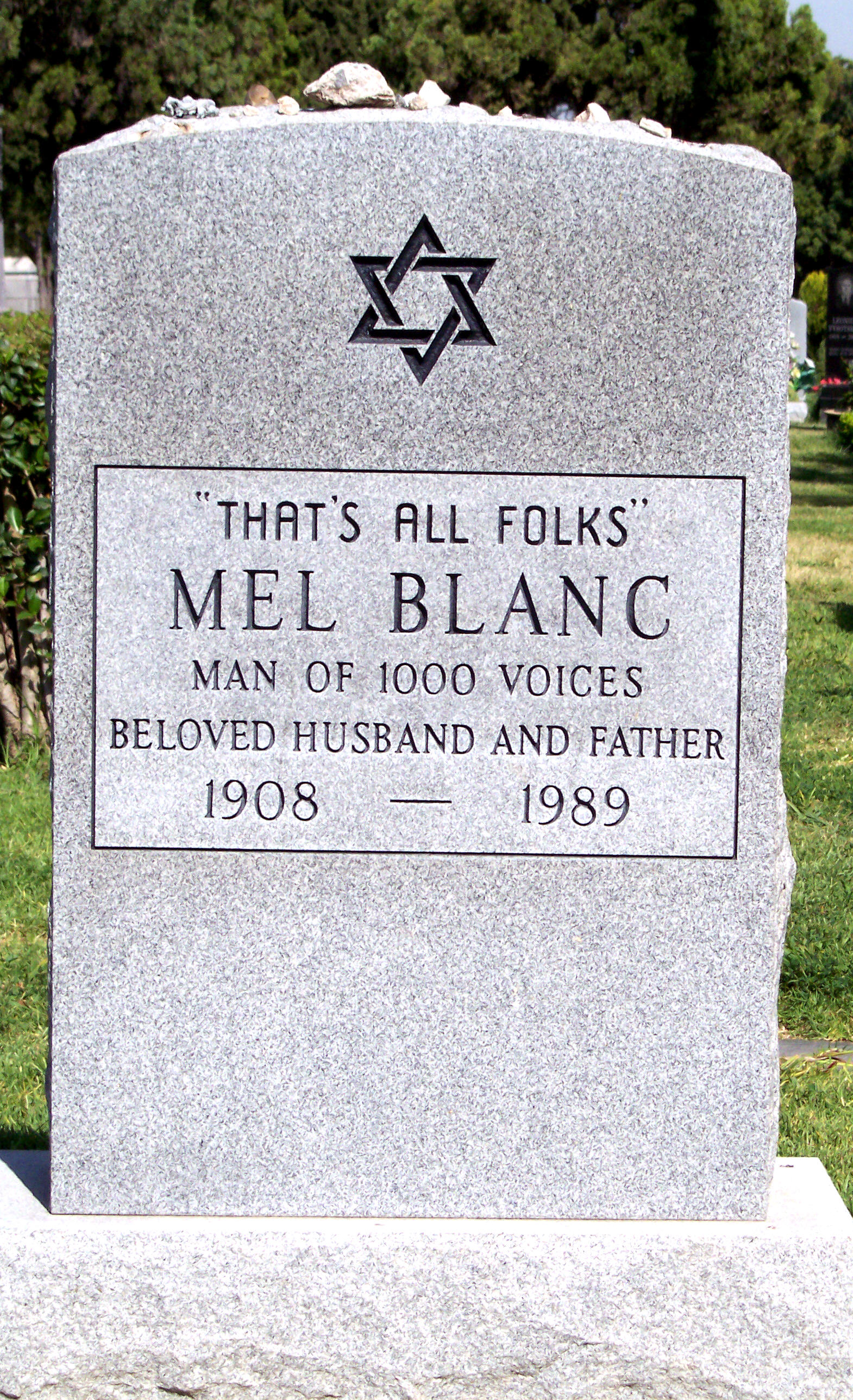
Blanc's tombstone at Hollywood Forever Cemetery

Blanc began smoking at least one pack of cigarettes per day at the age of nine and continued up through 1985, having quit smoking after being diagnosed with emphysema. He was later diagnosed with chronic obstructive pulmonary disease (COPD), after his family checked him into the Cedars-Sinai Medical Center in Los Angeles on May 19, 1989 when they noticed he had been coughing profusely while shooting an Oldsmobile commercial. He was originally expected to recover, but after his health had worsened, doctors discovered that he had advanced coronary artery disease. He also fell from his bed and broke his femur during the stay.

Blanc died at the age of 81 from complications related to both illnesses on July 10, 1989, at 2:30 pm, nearly two months after being admitted into the hospital. His last words to Noel just before his death were, in Yosemite Sam's voice, "Noel, I love you." He is interred in Hollywood Forever Cemetery section 13, Pinewood section, plot No. 149 in Hollywood. His will specified that his memorial marker read "That's all folks"—the phrase with which Blanc's character, Porky Pig, concluded Warner Bros. cartoons from 1937 to 1946.

== Legacy ==
Blanc is regarded as the most prolific voice actor in entertainment history. He was the first voice actor to receive on-screen credit.

Blanc's death was considered a significant loss to the cartoon industry because of his skill, expressive range, and the sheer number of the continuing characters he portrayed, whose roles were subsequently assumed by several other voice talents. As film critic Leonard Maltin observed, "It is astounding to realize that Tweety Bird and Yosemite Sam are the same man!" Darrell Van Citters drew a lithograph titled "Speechless" in tribute to Blanc, which showed a spotlight on a microphone while the Looney Tunes characters somberly bowed their heads in a moment of silence.

Blanc said that Sylvester the Cat was the easiest character for him to voice, because "[he's] just my normal speaking voice with a spray at the end"; and that Yosemite Sam was the hardest, because of his loudness and raspiness. A doctor who examined Blanc's throat found that he possessed unusually thick, powerful vocal cords that gave him an exceptional range, and compared them to those of opera singer Enrico Caruso.

After his death, Blanc's voice continued to be heard in newly released productions, such as recordings of Dino the Dinosaur in the live-action films The Flintstones (1994) and The Flintstones in Viva Rock Vegas (2000). Similarly, recordings of Blanc as Jack Benny's Maxwell were featured in Looney Tunes: Back in Action (2003). In 1994, the Blanc estate and Warner Bros. created the Warner-Blanc Audio Library, consisting of 550 songs and voices of Blanc's Looney Tunes characters, which he had begun setting down at his multi-track studio in 1958. 15 hours of new tapes of Mel's material were discovered in 1996. Noel Blanc stated that they could also rearrange "syllables" of the new recordings to create custom dialogue for the characters. These recordings were also used for toys, watches, video games, commercials, and websites. Later archive recordings of Blanc were featured in computer-generated imagery-animated Looney Tunes theatrical shorts; I Tawt I Taw a Puddy Tat (shown with Happy Feet Two) and Daffy's Rhapsody (shown with Journey 2: The Mysterious Island).

For his contributions to the radio industry, Blanc has a star on the Hollywood Walk of Fame at 6385 Hollywood Boulevard. His character Bugs Bunny was also awarded a star on the Hollywood Walk of Fame on December 10, 1985.

Blanc trained his son Noel in the field of voice characterization. Noel performed his father's characters (particularly Porky Pig) on some programs, but did not become a full-time voice artist. Warner Bros. expressed reluctance to have a single voice actor succeed Blanc, and employed multiple new voice actors to fill the roles since the 1990s, including Noel Blanc, Jeff Bergman, Joe Alaskey, Greg Burson, Bob Bergen, Billy West, Maurice LaMarche, and Eric Bauza.

On September 19, 2017, publisher Penguin Random House released the picture book Melvin the Mouth, written by Mel's daughter-in-law Katherine Blanc and illustrated by Jeffrey Ebbeler. The book follows the daily life of Blanc (here named "Melvin") during his childhood, in which he makes his comical noises and sound effects. An audiobook adaptation was released on December 15, 2017, narrated by Ramón De Ocampo.

== Filmography ==
=== Radio ===
Original air date	Program	Role
1933	The Happy-Go-Lucky Hour	Additional voices
1937	The Joe Penner Show	Additional voices
1938	The Mickey Mouse Theater of the Air	Mayor of Hamelin, Neptune's Son, Priscilly, Royal Herald, additional voices
1939–1943	Fibber McGee and Molly	Hiccuping Man
1939–1955	The Jack Benny Program	Sy, Polly the Parrot, Mr. Finque, Nottingham, Train Announcer, Jack Benny's Maxwell, additional voices
1940–1944, 1947–1948	Point Sublime	August Moon
1941–1943	The Great Gildersleeve	Floyd Munson
1942–1947	The Abbott and Costello Show	Himself, Botsford Twink, Scotty Brown
1943–1947	The George Burns and Gracie Allen Show	The Happy Postman
1943–1955	The Judy Canova Show	Paw, Pedro, Roscoe E. Wortle
1944	Nitwit Court	Bigelow Hornblower
1945	The Life of Riley	Additional voices
1945	It's Time to Smile (The Eddie Cantor Show)	Additional voices
1946–1947	The Mel Blanc Show	Himself, Dr. Christopher Crab, Zookie
1955–1956	The Cisco Kid	Pan Pancho (replacing Harry E. Lang), additional voices

=== Film ===
Year	Film	Role	Notes
1937–1989	Looney Tunes and Merrie Melodies shorts	Numerous voices	Includes the Bugs Bunny, Elmer Fudd (before and after Arthur Q. Bryan voiced Elmer, and even during Bryan's lifetime) Porky Pig, Daffy Duck and Sylvester series (817 cartoons total)
1937–1941	Color Rhapsody theatrical shorts	Various Insects, Fox, Crow, others	uncredited
1937–1938	Krazy Kat theatrical shorts	Krazy Kat, other characters	uncredited
1937–1941	Walter Lantz Cartune theatrical shorts	Woody Woodpecker, Papa Panda, Lil' Eightball, various characters	uncredited
1938–1939	The Captain and the Kids theatrical shorts	John Silver	5 shorts, uncredited
1940	Pinocchio	Gideon (hiccup)	uncredited
1940	Broadway Melody of 1940	Panhandler	uncredited
1941–1942	Speaking of Animals theatrical shorts	Various animals (voices)	uncredited
1942	Horton Hatches the Egg	Horton the Elephant (sneezing), Small Hunter, various characters	uncredited
1942	Rudyard Kipling's Jungle Book	Kaa, Grey Brother (voices)	uncredited
1943–1945	Private Snafu WWII shorts	Private Snafu, Bugs Bunny, additional characters	24 shorts, uncredited
1944	Jasper Goes Hunting	Bugs Bunny	Puppetoon; cameo uncredited
1948	Two Guys from Texas	Bugs Bunny (voice)	Animated cameo
1949	My Dream Is Yours	Bugs Bunny, Tweety (voices)	Animated cameos
1949	Neptune's Daughter	Pancho	
1950	Champagne for Caesar	Caesar (parrot)	
1952	Jack and the Beanstalk	Various animals (voices)	uncredited
1957	Hemo the Magnificent	Squirrel (voice)	uncredited
1961	Snow White and the Three Stooges	Quinto the Puppet (voice)	(uncredited)
1961	Breakfast at Tiffany's	Holly's Drunk Visitor	Cameo
1962	Gay Purr-ee	Bulldog	
1962–1965	Loopy De Loop theatrical shorts	Crow, Braxton Bear, Skunk, Duck Hunter	5 shorts
1963	Palm Springs Weekend	Bugs Bunny doll (voice)	Cameo
1963–1967	Tom and Jerry theatrical shorts	Tom and Jerry's vocal effects	34 shorts directed by Chuck Jones
1964	Kiss Me, Stupid	Dr. Sheldrake	
1964	Hey There, It's Yogi Bear!	Grifter Chizzling, Southern-Accented Bear on Train, Mugger (grumbling sounds)	
1965	The Pink Panther theatrical short	Drunk Man, Wife	
1966	The Man Called Flintstone	Barney Rubble, Dino	Based on The Flintstones series
1970	The Phantom Tollbooth	Officer Short Shrift, The Dodecahedron, The Demon of Insincerity	
1974	Journey Back to Oz	Crow	
1974	A Political Cartoon	Bugs Bunny (voice)	Cameo
1976	Son of Football Follies	Various characters (voices)	
1979	The Bugs Bunny/Road Runner Movie	Bugs Bunny, Daffy Duck, Porky Pig, Marvin the Martian, Wile E. Coyote, Pepé Le Pew, Dr. I.Q High, Hassan	
1981	The Looney, Looney, Looney Bugs Bunny Movie	Bugs Bunny, Daffy Duck, Yosemite Sam, Porky Pig, Pepé Le Pew, Sylvester, Tweety, Rocky, Mugsy, King Arthur, Sir Osis of Liver, Sir Loin of Beef, Gerry the Idgit Dragon, Treasury Director, Judge, Cops, Clancy, Clarence, O'Hara, Cats in B.A. (voice)	
1982	Bugs Bunny's 3rd Movie: 1001 Rabbit Tales	Bugs Bunny, Daffy Duck, Porky Pig and Yosemite Sam (voice)	
1983	Daffy Duck's Fantastic Island	Daffy Duck, Porky Pig, Sylvester, Yosemite Sam, Speedy Gonzales, Bugs Bunny, Tasmanian Devil, Foghorn Leghorn, Pepé Le Pew, Spike, Crows	
1983	Strange Brew	Father McKenzie (voice)	
1986	Heathcliff: The Movie	Heathcliff	
1988	Who Framed Roger Rabbit	Bugs Bunny, Daffy Duck, Porky Pig, Tweety, Sylvester	
1988	Daffy Duck's Quackbusters	Bugs Bunny, Daffy Duck, Porky Pig and J.P. Cubish	
1989	The Super Duper Football Follies	Various characters (voices)	Credited under "Special Thanks To"; posthumous release
1990	Jetsons: The Movie	Cosmo Spacely	Additional lines by Jeff Bergman; dedicated in memory; posthumous release
1994	The Flintstones	Dino	Archival recordings; posthumous release
2000	The Flintstones in Viva Rock Vegas	Puppy Dino	Archival recordings; posthumous release
2003	Looney Tunes: Back in Action	Gremlin Car	Archival recordings; posthumous release
2011	I Tawt I Taw A Puddy Tat	Tweety, Sylvester	Archival recordings; posthumous release
2012	Daffy's Rhapsody	Daffy Duck	Archival recordings; posthumous release
2014	Flash in the Pain	Tweety	Archival recordings; posthumous release

=== Television ===
Year	Title	Role	Notes
1950–65	The Jack Benny Program	Professor LeBlanc, Sy, Department Store Clerk, Gas Station Man, Mr. Finque, additional characters	62 episodes
1958	Perry Mason	Casanova (voice)	Episode: "The Case of the Perjured Parrot"
1959	The Many Loves of Dobie Gillis	Mr. Ziegler	Episode: "The Best Dressed Man"
1960–1966	The Flintstones	Barney Rubble, Dino, additional voices	163 episodes
1960	Mister Magoo	Additional voices	37 episodes
1960	The Three Stooges Scrapbook	Christopher Columbus, Manuel, Chief	Unaired pilot, uncredited
1961	Dennis the Menace	Leo Trinkle	Episode: "Miss Cathcart's Friend"
1962–1963; 1985–1987	The Jetsons	Cosmo Spacely, additional voices	55 episodes
1962–1963	Lippy the Lion & Hardy Har Har	Hardy Har Har, additional voices	52 episodes
1963	Wally Gator	Colonel Zachary Gator	Episode: "Carpet Bragger"
1964–1965	Ricochet Rabbit & Droop-a-Long	Droop-a-Long Coyote, additional voices	23 episodes
1964–1966	Breezly and Sneezly	Sneezly Seal	23 episodes
1964–1966	The Munsters	Cuckoo Clock (voice)	6 episodes
1964	The Beverly Hillbillies	Dick Burton	1 episode
1965–1966	The Atom Ant/Secret Squirrel Show	Secret Squirrel	26 episodes
1965–1966	Sinbad Jr. and His Magic Belt	Salty the Parrot	81 episodes
1966	The Monkees	Monkeemobile engine (voice)	1 episode
1969–1970	The Perils of Penelope Pitstop	Yak Yak, The Bully Brothers, Chug-A-Boom	7 episodes
1970	Where's Huddles?	Bubba McCoy	11 episodes
1970	Tales of Washington Irving	Brom's Dog, Nicholas Vedder, Lead Dwarf, Ninepin Bowlers, Mayor Elect, Candidate, Baby Rip, additional voices	TV special
1971–1972	Curiosity Shop	Ole Factory the Bloodhound, Halcyon the Hyena, Computer, additional voices	17 episodes
1971–1972	The Pebbles and Bamm-Bamm Show	Barney Rubble, additional voices	15 episodes
1972–1989	Looney Tunes TV specials	Bugs Bunny, Daffy Duck, Porky Pig, Elmer Fudd, Sylvester, Tweety, Wile E. Coyote, Pepé Le Pew, Marvin the Martian, Tasmanian Devil, Yosemite Sam, Foghorn Leghorn, Speedy Gonzales, additional voices	20 specials
1972–1973	The Flintstone Comedy Hour	Barney Rubble, Dino, Zonk, Stub	18 episodes
1973	Speed Buggy	Speed Buggy	16 episodes
1973	The New Scooby-Doo Movies	Speed Buggy	Episode: "The Weird Winds of Winona"
1973	A Very Merry Cricket	Tucker R. Mouse, Alley Cat	TV special
1975	Yankee Doodle Cricket	Tucker R. Mouse, Rattlesnake, Bald Eagle	TV special
1977–1978	Scooby's All-Star Laff-A-Lympics	Speed Buggy, Captain Caveman, Barney Rubble	4 episodes
1977–1980	Captain Caveman and the Teen Angels	Captain Caveman	40 episodes
1977–1986	Flintstones TV specials	Barney Rubble, Dino	6 specials
1978	Hanna-Barbera's All-Star Comedy Ice Revue	Barney Rubble, Dino	TV special
1978–1979	Galaxy Goof-Ups	Quack-Up	13 episodes
1979	The New Fred and Barney Show	Barney Rubble, Dino, additional voices	17 episodes
1979–1981	Buck Rogers in the 25th Century	Twiki (voice)	25 episodes
1980–1982	Heathcliff	Heathcliff	26 episodes
1980–1982	The Flintstone Comedy Show	Barney Rubble, Dino, Captain Caveman	36 episodes
1980	Murder Can Hurt You	Chickie Baby (voice)	TV movie
1981–1982	Trollkins	Additional voices	13 episodes
1982	Yogi Bear's All Star Comedy Christmas Caper	Barney Rubble, additional voices	TV special
1984–1986	Heathcliff and the Catillac Cats	Heathcliff	86 episodes
1984	Saturday's the Place!	Bugs Bunny	TV special
1985	Press Your Luck	Sylvester, Speedy Gonzales, Porky Pig	1 episode
1986–1988	The Flintstone Kids	Dino, Robert Rubble, Captain Caveman, Piggy McGrabit	26 episodes
1987	Sparky's Magic Piano	Max, Sam, Laughing Audience Member	TV special
1987	The Jetsons Meet the Flintstones	Barney Rubble, Dino, Cosmo Spacely	TV movie
1988	Rockin' with Judy Jetson	Cosmo Spacely	TV movie
1989	Dance Party USA	Bugs Bunny, Elmer Fudd, Daffy Duck, Porky Pig	1 episode
1989	Hanna-Barbera's 50th: A Yabba Dabba Doo Celebration	Barney Rubble	TV special; posthumous release

=== Video games ===
Year	Title	Role	Notes
1990	Bugs Bunny's Birthday Ball	Sylvester	Archival recording
1999	Bugs Bunny: Lost in Time	Pirate Yosemite Sam, Daffy Duck	Archival recordings

=== Theme park attractions ===
Year	Title	Role	Notes
1964	Carousel of Progress	Uncle Orville, Parrot, Cuckoo Clock, Radio Personalities	Mel Blanc's voices for the Cuckoo Clock and Radio Personalities were re-recorded by his son Noel Blanc in 1993.
1980	The Bugs Bunny Merrie Holiday Revue	Bugs Bunny, Daffy Duck, Porky Pig, Sylvester, Tweety, Foghorn Leghorn	Live show at Six Flags AstroWorld
1981–1984	Foghorn Leghorn	Foghorn Leghorn	10-minute animatronic show at Six Flags Great America's Snowshoe Saloon, designed by Creative Presentations
1982–1984	The Looney Tunes Revue	Bugs Bunny, Daffy Duck, Porky Pig, Pepé Le Pew, Yosemite Sam, Sylvester, Sylvester Jr., Tweety, Speedy Gonzales, Foghorn Leghorn, Henery Hawk, Tasmanian Devil	Animatronic show at Gadgets restaurants, designed by Advanced Animations (later Warner Technologies)
1991	Looney Tunes River Ride	Tasmanian Devil	Archival recordings
1992	Yosemite Sam and the Gold River Adventure!	Tasmanian Devil, Tasmanian She-Devil	Archival recordings from Devil May Hare
1992	Bugs Bunny Goin' Hollywood	Tasmanian Devil	Archival recordings

=== Discography ===
- Yah, Das Ist Ein Christmas Tree and I Tan't Wait Til Quithmuth Day (Capitol, 1950, Album CAS-3191)
- Clink, Clink, Another Drink (Bluebird, 1942) as Drunk
- Bugs Bunny Stories for Children (Capitol, 1947) as Bugs Bunny, Daffy Duck, Porky Pig, additional voices
- The Woody Woodpecker Song (Capitol, 1948) as Woody Woodpecker
- Bugs Bunny and the Tortoise (Capitol, 1948) as Bugs Bunny, Cecil Turtle, Daffy Duck, Henery Hawk, additional voices
- That's All Folks! (Capitol, 1948) as Porky Pig
- Won't You Ever Get Together With Me (Capitol, 1948) as Tweety, Sylvester
- Bugs Bunny in Storyland (Capitol, 1949) as Bugs Bunny, Daffy Duck, Porky Pig, Beaky Buzzard, Old King Cole, Fiddlers Three, Mary's Lamb, Bo Peep's Sheep, Big Bad Wolf
- "Clink, Clink, Another Drink" (with Spike Jones and His City Slickers) (Bluebird Records, 1949), sings the bridge and hiccups
- Woody Woodpecker and His Talent Show (Capitol, 1949) as Woody Woodpecker, Stanley Squirrel, Billy Goat, Plato Platypus, Fido, Happy Hedgehog, Harry Humbug
- Bugs Bunny Sings with Daffy Duck, Tweety Pie, Yosemite Sam, Sylvester (Capitol, 1950) as Bugs Bunny, Daffy Duck, Yosemite Sam, Tweety, Sylvester
- Bugs Bunny Meets Hiawatha (Capitol, 1950) as Bugs Bunny
- Daffy Duck Meets Yosemite Sam (Capitol, 1950) as Daffy Duck, Yosemite Sam
- Tweety Pie (Capitol, 1950) as Tweety, Sylvester
- Woody Woodpecker's Picnic (Capitol, 1951) as Woody Woodpecker, Tommy Turtle, English Bulldog, German Shepherd, Irish Setter, Scotty
- Henery Hawk (Capitol, 1951) as Henery Hawk, Foghorn Leghorn, Daffy Duck
- Tweety's Puddy Tat Twouble (Capitol, 1951) as Tweety, Sylvester
- Tweet, Tweet, Tweety (Capitol, 1952) as Tweety, Sylvester
- Bugs Bunny and the Grow-Small Juice (Capitol, 1952) as Bugs Bunny, Daffy Duck
- Henery Hawk's Chicken Hunt (Capitol, 1952) as Henery Hawk, Foghorn Leghorn, additional voices
- Bugs Bunny and Aladdin's Lamp (Capitol, 1952) as Bugs Bunny, Genie
- Woody Woodpecker and the Scarecrow (Capitol, 1952) as Woody Woodpecker, additional voices
- Daffy Duck's Feathered Friend (Capitol, 1952) as Daffy Duck
- Sylvester and Hippety Hopper (Capitol, 1952) as Sylvester, Sylvester Jr., additional voices
- Woody Woodpecker and the Animal Crackers (Capitol, 1953) as Woody Woodpecker, additional voices
- Woody Woodpecker and the Lost Monkey (Capitol, 1953) as Woody Woodpecker, additional voices
- Bugs Bunny and Rabbit Seasoning (Capitol, 1953) as Bugs Bunny
- Snowbound Tweety (Capitol, 1953) as Tweety, Sylvester
- Woody Woodpecker and His Spaceship (Capitol, 1953) as Woody Woodpecker, additional voices
- Wild West Henery Hawk (Capitol, 1953) as Henery Hawk, Foghorn Leghorn, additional voices
- Pied Piper Pussycat (Capitol, 1953) as Sylvester, additional voices
- Daffy Duck's Duck Inn (Capitol, 1954) as Daffy Duck, Dog
- Bugs Bunny and the Pirate (Capitol, 1954) as Bugs Bunny, Yosemite Sam
- Woody Woodpecker and the Truth Tonic (Capitol, 1954) as Woody Woodpecker, additional voices
- Tweety's Good Deed (Capitol, 1954) as Tweety, Sylvester, additional voices
- Woody Woodpecker's Fairy Godmother (Capitol, 1955) as Woody Woodpecker, additional voices
- Woody Woodpecker in Mixed-Up Land (Capitol, 1955) as Woody Woodpecker, additional voices
- Woody Woodpecker Meets Davy Crockett (Capitol, 1955) as Woody Woodpecker, additional voices
- Woody Woodpecker's Family Album (Decca, 1957) as Pepito, sailor, Malamute, Andy Panda, Fluten Bluten, Heinie the Hyena, Homer Pigeon, Cuckoo, Oswald the Lucky Rabbit
- "There's a Hole in the Iron Curtain" (with Mickey Katz and His Orchestra) (Capitol, 1960, Album 45–5425)
- Bugs Bunny Songfest (Golden, 1961) as Bugs Bunny, Sylvester, Tweety, Daffy Duck, Porky Pig, Henery Hawk, Pepé Le Pew, Speedy Gonzales, Hippety Hopper, Foghorn Leghorn, Cicero Pig
- Speedy Gonzales (Dot, 1962) as Speedy Gonzales
- Magilla Gorilla and His Pals (Golden, 1964) as Droop-A-Long
- The Flintstones: Flip Fables (Hanna-Barbera, 1965) as Barney Rubble, Chubby, Tubby, Stubby, Landlord, Beowolfe
- The Flintstones: Hansel and Gretel (Hanna-Barbera, 1965) as Barney Rubble, Hansel, Gretel, Strudelmeyer, Fang, Witch, Reporter
- Treasure Island Starring Sinbad, Jr. (Hanna-Barbera, 1965) as Salty
- Secret Squirrel and Morocco Mole in: Super Spy (Hanna-Barbera, 1965) as Secret Squirrel, Tyrone
- The New Alice in Wonderland or What's a Nice Kid Like You Doing in a Place Like This? (Hanna-Barbera, 1966) as Barney Rubble, March Hare, Prosecuting Attorney/King's Son
- The Flintstones Meet the Orchestra Family (Sunset, 1968) as Barney Rubble
- The New Adventures of Bugs Bunny (Peter Pan, 1973) as Bugs Bunny, Daffy Duck, Porky Pig, Elmer Fudd, Yosemite Sam, Petunia Pig, Speedy Gonzales, Pablo, Wile E. Coyote, Road Runner, additional voices
- Four More Adventures of Bugs Bunny (Peter Pan, 1974) as Bugs Bunny, Daffy Duck, Porky Pig, Elmer Fudd, Yosemite Sam, Petunia Pig, Speedy Gonzales, Tweety, Sylvester, Granny, Road Runner, additional voices
- Holly Daze (Peter Pan, 1974) as Bugs Bunny, Porky Pig, Speedy Gonzales, Daffy Duck, Elmer Fudd, Granny, Yosemite Sam, Foghorn Leghorn, Sylvester, Junior, Santa Claus, narrator, Radio Announcer
- Bugs Bunny Goes To Sea (Fisher-Price, 1978) as Bugs Bunny, Yosemite Sam, additional voices
- The Desert Island (Fisher-Price, 1978) as Bugs Bunny, Yosemite Sam
- Looney Tales (Fisher-Price, 1978) as Bugs Bunny, Daffy Duck, Porky Pig, Elmer Fudd, Tweety, Sylvester, Granny, additional voices
- Looney Tunes Learn About Numbers (Warner Audio Publishing, 1986) as Bugs Bunny, Elmer Fudd, Yosemite Sam, additional voices
- Looney Tunes Learn About The Alphabet (Warner Audio Publishing, 1986) as Bugs Bunny, Daffy Duck, Yosemite Sam, additional voices
- Looney Tunes Learn About Going To School (Warner Audio Publishing, 1986) as Bugs Bunny, Sylvester, Sylvester Jr., Tweety, additional voices
- Looney Tunes Learn About Sing-Along Songs (Warner Audio Publishing, 1986) as Bugs Bunny, Daffy Duck, Porky Pig, Tweety, Sylvester, Elmer Fudd, Yosemite Sam, additional voices
- Looney Tunes Learn About Colors (Warner Audio Publishing, 1986) as Bugs Bunny, Porky Pig, additional voices
- Looney Tunes Learn About Shapes and Sizes (Warner Audio Publishing, 1986) as Bugs Bunny, Cecil Turtle, Daffy Duck, Porky Pig, Elmer Fudd, additional voices
- Space Jam: Music from and Inspired by the Motion Picture (Warner Sunset/Atlantic, 1996) as Porky Pig (archive recording)
