= G. Stanley Jones =

Canadian actor (1926–1998)

- Born: October 23, 1926; Toronto, Ontario, Canada
- Died: December 30, 1998 (aged 72); Los Angeles, California, U.S.
- Other names: G. Stanley Jones; Staley Jones; Stanley Jones
- Occupation: Actor
- Years active: 1955–1997

Gordon Stanley Jones (October 23, 1926 – December 30, 1998), sometimes credited as G. Stanley Jones, Stanley G. Jones or Stanley Jones, was a Canadian-born radio, film and television actor.

== Early life ==
Jones was born in Toronto, Ontario.

== Career ==
Jones appeared in over thirty television series productions and in eight films. He did extensive voice acting, including an imitation of Peter Lorre with a French accent on the radio program Yours Truly, Johnny Dollar. He was the narrator of the film Little Shop of Horrors (1986). One of his few non-voice roles was as a teller in an episode of the television series Beverly Hills, 90210.

Stan Jones is best known as the voice of Lex Luthor, the Superman villain and leader of The Legion of Doom, in the Hanna-Barbera television series Challenge of the Superfriends, as well as voicing the characters Scourge, Lord Zarak and Weirdwolf in the television series The Transformers. He also played the voices of Kingpin and Doctor Octopus in the 1981 Spider-Man animated series. He voiced the Milkman, Wordsworth and Riff Raff in the television series Heathcliff (also known as Heathcliff and The Catillac Cats). He also voiced McAlister in the 1995 Don Bluth film The Pebble and the Penguin.

== Death ==
Jones died of complications from cancer in Los Angeles, California at the age of 72.

== Selected filmography ==
- Alfred Hitchcock Presents (1959) (Season 4 Episode 31: "Your Witness") as Dan Irwin
- The Alfred Hitchcock Hour (1962) (Season 1 Episode 14: "The Tender Poisoner") as Drug Clerk
