= Heathcliff (comic strip) =

American comic strip

- Author(s): George Gately (1973–1998); Peter Gallagher (1998–present)
- Website: heathcliff.com
- Current status/schedule: Running/daily
- Launch date: September 3, 1973; 53 years ago
- Syndicate(s): Creators Syndicate (since 1988); McNaught Syndicate (former)

Heathcliff is an American comic strip created by George Gately in 1973, featuring the title character, Heathcliff the orange cat. Now written and drawn by Gately's nephew, Peter Gallagher, it is distributed to over 1,000 newspapers by Creators Syndicate, which took over the comic from McNaught Syndicate in 1988.

The strip and its title character show some resemblance to the more famous Garfield, and as such, people commonly misconstrue Heathcliff to be a knockoff; however, Heathcliff was published five years before the first nationally-syndicated Garfield strip.

The strip is usually presented in single-panel gag cartoons on weekdays. On Sundays, however, the strip is expanded to multiple panels (usually 6–8) and titled Sunday with Heathcliff. A regular feature in the Sunday strips is Kitty Korner, which illustrates single-panel reader-submitted stories about real-world cats and is placed in the bottom right corner, hence the name.

== History ==
After drawing less popular comic strips Hapless Harry and Hippy for several years, George Gately found success with his single panel comic Heathcliff, first published on September 3, 1973. The orange cat was named after the antiheroic character Heathcliff from Emily Bronte's novel Wuthering Heights.

By the 1990s, Gately's brother, cartoonist John Gallagher regularly contributed to the strip, as did inker Bob Laughlin.

Peter Gallagher, the nephew of Gately and John Gallagher, began working with his uncles in an unofficial apprenticeship in 1994 and took over writing and illustrating the strip with their retirement in 1998. Gately died three years later in 2001.

== Characters and themes ==
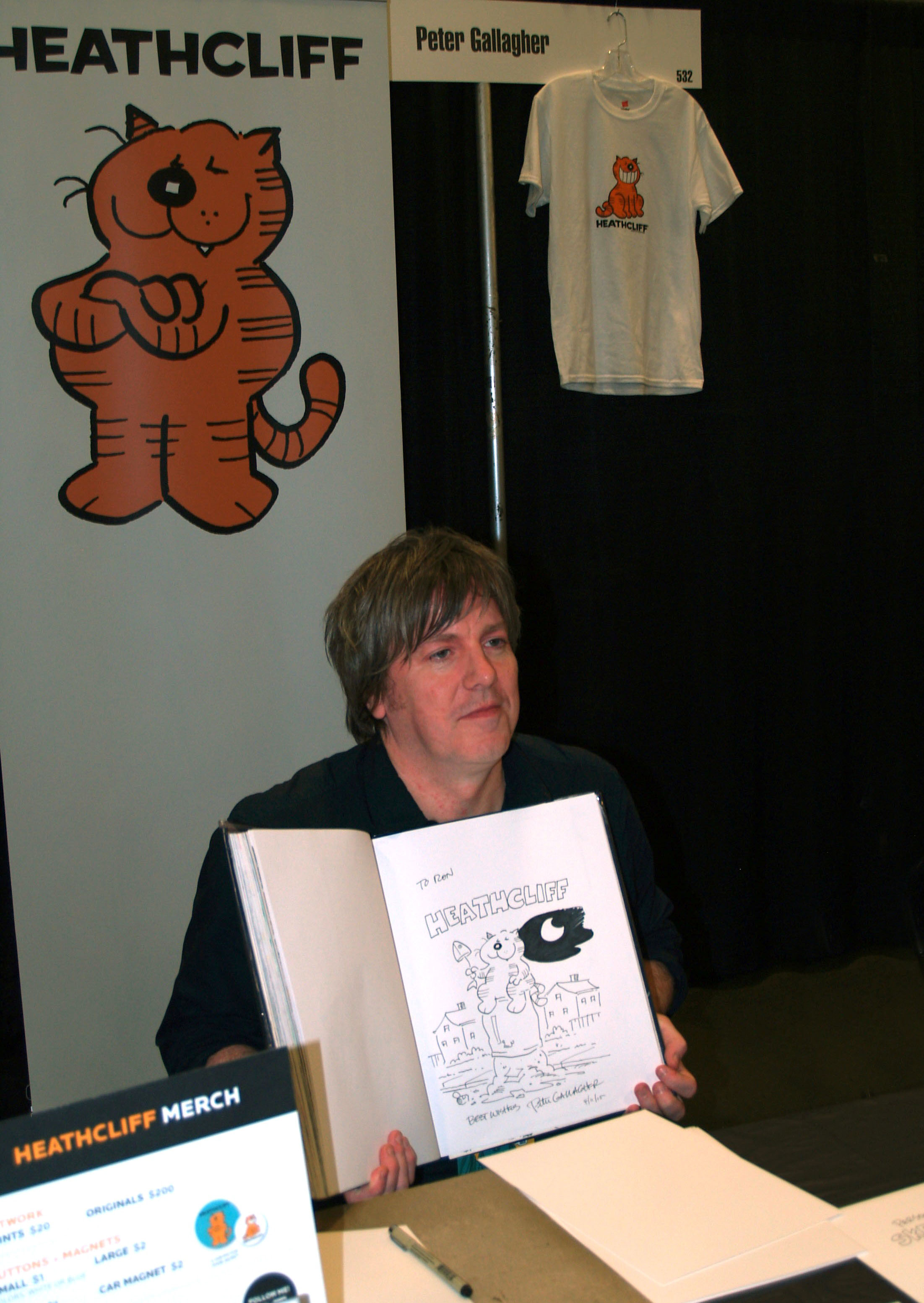
Writer/artist Peter Gallagher at the 2015 East Coast Comicon in Secaucus, New Jersey

The strip takes place in a port town called Westfinster. The title character is Heathcliff, an orange housecat owned by an elderly couple named Mr. and Mrs. Nutmeg and their grandson Iggy. Heathcliff's typical activities include fighting neighborhood dogs and mice in humorous ways, attempting to eat pet fish and birds, and causing mischief with the town's fishmongers, butchers, dog catchers, and sanitation workers. Other long-running characters include Sonja, a fluffy white cat who is Heathcliff's girlfriend; Heathcliff's nemesis Spike the bulldog; Marcy, a neighborhood girl who dresses up Heathcliff in baby clothes; Willy, Iggy's best friend; and "Pops", Heathcliff's father who is a career criminal.

After taking over authorship, Peter Gallagher introduced recurring elements of surreal humor. A profile in The New York Times identifies a comic published on Oct. 24, 2007 as a turning point toward "surreal, logic-defying" comedy. It depicts the Nutmeg family preparing to eat a ham at the dinner table while Heathcliff wears a helmet labeled with the word "ham" without explanation. The caption reads "Watch out — he's wearing the helmet." Subsequently, helmets emblazoned with words such as "meat" and "ham" appeared frequently. Other recurring gags from Peter Gallagher's era include bubble gum that allows characters to float in the air, Bro Fish (fish who only say "bro"), a fire-breathing Chihuahua, robots, and unauthorized parodic cameo appearances by characters such as Garfield.

Gallagher's first new character to gain an internet following was the Garbage Ape, a hopping ape who appears in the neighborhood on garbage night, introduced as a mythical being that cats would believe in instead of the Easter Bunny. Another recurring character is Jimmy, a small frog whom Heathcliff promotes as a celebrity and entertainer. However, Jimmy is met by almost complete indifference from the public, despite Heathcliff's undying belief in him. Ironically, Jimmy has become a popular character among the comic strip's fans on social media.

== Writing ==
After taking over Heathcliff in 1998, Peter Gallagher planned to maintain the traditional appearance of the comic while gradually inserting his own sense of humor. Later, Gallagher fully committed to this change, stating that his philosophy became, "I'd rather go down with my own humor than trying to be like, this middle of the road, kind of safe comic..."

Writing for The Outline, Max Genecov identifies a "Weird Heathcliff" internet fandom that has arisen around the surreal humor introduced by Gallagher and compares the comic to anti-comedy and Dadaism hidden amongst the more normal contents of the funny papers. Cartoonist Ward Sutton describes the humor of Heathcliff as "sometimes meta, sometimes head-scratching, but most always surprising".

In an interview with SOLRAD, Gallagher responded to criticisms that his humor was nonsensical, stating that he has reasoning behind his gag writing, but he avoids over-explaining jokes: "If you over-explain it, you ruin it. If you under-explain it, then people are confused ... I think I’ve decided on the under-explaining." In the same interview, Peter Gallagher stated that his uncles Gately and Gallagher told him, "We've done so many ideas about a cat cartoon that you're going to repeat, and so we can’t use those." They encouraged him to use his own sense of humor instead of mimicking theirs.

== In other media ==
=== Comic books ===
Starting in 1985, Star Comics, an imprint of Marvel Comics, began producing comic books titled Heathcliff. The series ran for 56 issues, changing to the Marvel Comics brand with issue #23. Star Comics added an additional spin-off title in 1987 called Heathcliff's Funhouse (which also switched over to Marvel with issue #6). It was a combination of new material and reprinted stories that first appeared in the original Heathcliff title. In the comics, Heathcliff had a far better relationship with Mr. Nutmeg, and much of his adventures were done with Mr. Nutmeg's grandson. Heathcliff's reputation for adventurism was even noted by the local police, who recruited him for a sting operation against a gang of cats stealing purses, in exchange for them forgiving the fact Heathcliff swiped shellfish. Within the Marvel Comics multiverse, Heathcliff's reality is designated as Earth-85481.

- Heathcliff: The Trickiest Cat in Town (1 issue, Marvel Books)
- Heathcliff the Fish Bandit (1 issue, Marvel Books)
- Heathcliff Goes to Hollywood (1 issue, Marvel Books)
- Heathcliff in Outer Space (1 issue, Marvel Books)
- Heathcliff (56 issues, Star/Marvel)
- Heathcliff Annual (1 issue, Star)
- Heathcliff's Funhouse (10 issues, Star/Marvel)
- Heathcliff Spring Special (1 issue, Marvel UK)
- Star Comics Presents: Heathcliff (1 issue, ashcan)
- Star Comics Magazine (AKA Star Comics Digest) (13 issues, Star)

=== Animated series ===
Two animated TV series based on the strip, both simply named Heathcliff, were created. Although Heathcliff does not speak in the comic strip, both animated versions of the character were voiced by Mel Blanc. Heathcliff was one of the last original characters Blanc voiced before his death in 1989.

The first Heathcliff was produced by Ruby-Spears Productions and debuted in 1980. The first season featured segments with Dingbat and the Creeps (Dingbat is the vampire dog, who was voiced by Frank Welker, accompanied by Spare Rib the skeleton and Nobody the jack-o-lantern who were both voiced by Don Messick), which were created by Ruby-Spears for the show, and the second season featured fellow comic strip character Marmaduke (voiced by Paul Winchell). This version is sometimes seen on Boomerang.

In 1984, the second Heathcliff debuted, which was produced by DIC Entertainment. This series featured segments with the Catillac Cats (AKA Cats and Co. by the end credits of the show), which is why this version is sometimes referred to as Heathcliff and the Catillac Cats. In 2005, Shout! Factory released a Volume 1 DVD for the show, featuring the first 24 episodes of the series. Since then, Mill Creek Entertainment has gained the license and released the show on DVD, with a ten-episode best-of compilation entitled King of the Beasts and two volumes that cover Season 1; volume 1 contains 32 episodes, while volume 2 has the remaining 33.

In 2021, the film and TV rights of Heathcliff were acquired by Legendary.

=== Film ===
In 1986, Heathcliff: The Movie debuted in theaters. It was an anthology film which consisted of seven episodes from the 1984 series. The film was released on VHS by Paramount Home Video in 1988.

A CGI-animated Heathcliff film was in development for several years. In 2010, a trailer for Heathcliff in Bad Kitty was released, but the movie itself never materialized.

As of 2021, Legendary Entertainment has plans to simultaneously develop a TV series and film based on the Heathcliff comics. Gallagher will produce the film alongside Steve Waterman.

=== Video games ===
- Heathcliff: Fun with Spelling, published by Datasoft for Atari 8-bit computers and Commodore 64 (1984)
- Heathcliff: Frantic Foto, published by Storm City Games, Nintendo DS (2010)
- Heathcliff: The Fast and the Furriest, published by Storm City Games, Wii (2010)
- Heathcliff: Spot On, published by Enjoy Gaming, Nintendo DS (DSiWare; 2013)
