= Heathcliff (1980 TV series) =

1980 animated series

- Also known as: Heathcliff and Dingbat; Heathcliff and Marmaduke
- Genre: Animated series
- Created by: George Gately (Heathcliff character); Brad Anderson (Marmaduke character); Joe Ruby; Ken Spears
- Story by: Tony Benedict; Tom Dagenais; Paul Haggis; Gordon Kent; Michael Maurer; Dalton Sandifer; Buzz Dixon; Elana Lesser; Cliff Ruby; Jack Enyart; Jack Hanrahan; Mark Jones; Don Jurwich; Kayte Kuch; Jim McNamara; Mark Shiney; John Dunn (uncredited)
- Directed by: Charles A. Nichols; John Kimball
- Voices of: Mel Blanc; Henry Corden; June Foray; Don Messick; Russi Taylor; Frank Welker; Paul Winchell
- Opening theme: "Heathcliff and Marmaduke Theme" by Scatman Crothers (season 2)
- Ending theme: "Heathcliff and Marmaduke Theme" (instrumental, season 2)
- Country of origin: United States
- Original language: English
- No. of seasons: 2
- No. of episodes: 26 (90 segments)

Production
- Executive producers: Joe Ruby; Ken Spears
- Producer: Jerry Eisenberg
- Running time: 30 minutes
- Production companies: Ruby-Spears Productions; McNaught Syndicate; United Features Syndicate (season 2)

Original release
- Network: ABC
- Release: October 4, 1980 – December 5, 1981

Related
- Heathcliff (1984)

Heathcliff is a half-hour Saturday morning animated series based on the Heathcliff comic strip created by George Gately and produced by Ruby-Spears Productions. It premiered on ABC on October 4, 1980, with a total of 26 episodes produced under the titles Heathcliff and Dingbat and Heathcliff and Marmaduke.

== History ==
The series began production on November 10, 1979.

The first season, called Heathcliff and Dingbat, ran for 13 episodes and included backup segments with Dingbat and the Creeps, who were created for the show.

Dingbat and the Creeps revolved around the adventures of three monstrous characters who were self-employed as "Odd Jobs, Inc." which consisted of Dingbat, a vampire dog who used a bat-shaped novelty straw to eat most foods; Sparerib, a strangely rotund skeleton with the ability to change himself into useful items (such as a floor lamp, which he did in the opening credits); and Nobody, a gravelly-voiced jack-o-lantern who led the team and often found them various work.

The second season, called Heathcliff and Marmaduke, ran for 13 episodes and featured backup segments with fellow comic strip character Marmaduke (although the Marmaduke segments are actually the first to be seen in each half-hour show).

Reruns of the second season (Heathcliff and Marmaduke) were seen occasionally on Boomerang and are sometimes seen on MeTV Toons.

In 1983, NBC reran the show as a segment on Thundarr the Barbarian reruns.

Two years after this show ended, another one based on Heathcliff was produced by DIC Entertainment, which was called simply Heathcliff, although for distinction this series is usually referred to by the expanded title of Heathcliff and the Catillac Cats.

Dingbat has appeared as a cameo in a Yogi Bear comic with many Hanna-Barbera animal characters captured. He was the only Ruby-Spears character there.

== Cast ==
- Mel Blanc as Heathcliff, Spike, Mr. Nutmeg, Mr. Schultz, Milkman
- Henry Corden as Clem, Digby, Dogcatcher, Officer Casey
- June Foray as Iggy, Muggsy, Mrs. Nutmeg, Sonja, Marcy
- Don Messick as Sparerib, Nobody, Mr. Post, Mr. Snyder
- Russi Taylor as Barbie Winslow, Billy Winslow, Dottie Winslow
- Frank Welker as Dingbat
- Paul Winchell as Marmaduke, Phil Winslow

=== Additional voices ===
- Takayo Doran – (season 1)
- Clare Peck – (season 1)
- Marilyn Schreffler – (seasons 1 & 2)
- Judy Strangis – (season 1)
- Janet Waldo – (season 1)
- Alan Dinehart – (season 2)
- Avery Schreiber – (season 2)
- Hal Smith – (season 2)

== Episodes ==
=== Season 1: Heathcliff and Dingbat (1980) ===
Each episode consists of two 4-6-minute Heathcliff cartoons and two 4-6-minute "Dingbat and the Creeps" cartoons.

Nº	Heathcliff	Dingbat and the Creeps	Air date
1	Feline Fugitive / Doggone Dogcatcher	Football Flunkies / Lumbering Loonies	October 4, 1980
2	The Watchcat / Pumping Irony	It's a Snow Job for a Creep / Knutty Knights	October 11, 1980
3	Great Cop 'n Cat Chase / Milk Run Mayhem	Heir Today Gone Tomorrow / U.F. Oafs	October 18, 1980
4	Mascot Rumble / Heathcliff of Sherwood Forest	Safari Saps / Prized Pooch	October 25, 1980
5	Angling Anglers / Cake Flakes	Health Nutz / Retail Ruckus	November 1, 1980
6	The Mouse Trapper / Lion Around the House	Window Washouts / Door to Door Sales Creeps	November 8, 1980
7	Robinson Cruise Ho / Heathcliff & the Sleeping Beauty	Creep Crop Crack-ups / Nautical Noodnicks	November 15, 1980
8	Gold-Digger Daze / Hives	Batty Boo-ticians / Carnival Cut-ups	November 22, 1980
9	Rodeo Dough / Pinocchio Rides Again	Bungling Baby Sitters / Treasure Haunts	November 29, 1980
10	Cat In The Beanstalk / The Great Chase	LeMans-ter Rally / Beach Blanket Bozos	December 6, 1980
11	Kitty a la Carte / Mystery Loves Company	French Fried Fracas / Showbiz Shenanigans	December 13, 1980
12	Red Hot Riding Hooded Heathcliff / The Great Milk Factory Fracas	Service Station Screwballs / No News Is Ghoul News	December 20, 1980
13	Star Trick / The Big Fish Story	Detective Ding-a-Lings / High Flying Fools	December 27, 1980

=== Season 2: Heathcliff and Marmaduke (1981) ===
Each episode consists of a 4-6-minute Heathcliff cartoon sandwiched between two (or 3) 4-6-minute Marmaduke cartoons. Scatman Crothers sang its theme song. It competed with The Smurfs on NBC.

Nº	Marmaduke	Heathcliff	Marmaduke	Air date
1	Home Run Rover	Gator Go Round	Play Grounded	September 12, 1981
2	Missy Miseque	Crazy Daze	Shuttle Off to Buffalo	September 19, 1981
3	Wish Bones	Caught Cat Napping	Wondermutt	September 26, 1981
4	Gone with the Whim	Dud Boat	Seagoing Watchdog	October 3, 1981
5	Beach Brawl	Of Mice and Menace	Tricky Treat	October 10, 1981
6	Ghostly Goof Up	A Briefcase of Cloak and Dagger	Fret Vet	October 17, 1981
7	Bearly Camping	Tabby and the Pirate	Gold Fever Fracas	October 24, 1981
8	Police Pooch	Mush Heathcliff Mush	Bone to Pick with Marmaduke	October 31, 1981
9	Surburden Cowboy	A Close Encounter	Marmaduke of the Movies	November 7, 1981
10	Baby Sitting Shenanigans	A New Kit on the Block	Kitty Sitter	November 14, 1981
11	Leapin' Leprechaun	Clon'en Around	School Daze	November 21, 1981
12	Caper Cracker	Cat Kit	Barking for Dollars	November 28, 1981
13	The Lemonade Kid	The Great Milk Factory Fracas (repeat from Dingbat)	Double Trouble Maker	December 5, 1981

== Home media ==
Warner Bros. Home Entertainment released The Heathcliff and Dingbat Show on DVD in region 1 via their Warner Archive Collection in August 2012. This is a Manufacture-on-Demand (MOD) release, available exclusively in the US and only through Warner's online store or Amazon.com.
