= Heathcliff (1984 TV series) =

1984 children's animated television series

- Also known as: Heathcliff and the Catillac Cats; Les Entrechats (France); Heathcliff Cats & Co. (United Kingdom)
- Genre: Animated series Comedy; Slapstick
- Created by: George Gately (Heathcliff); Bruno Bianchi (The Catillac Cats)
- Based on: Heathcliff by George Gately
- Developed by: Jean Chalopin; Alan Swayze; Chuck Lorre
- Written by: Alan Swayze
- Directed by: Michael Maliani; Marsha Goodman; Victor Villegas (season 2)
- Voices of: Mel Blanc
- Theme music composer: Haim Saban; Shuki Levy
- Opening theme: "Heathcliff" (long version)
- Ending theme: "Heathcliff" (short version)
- Composers: Haim Saban; Shuki Levy
- Countries of origin: United States; France (season 1)
- Original languages: English; French
- No. of seasons: 2
- No. of episodes: 86

Production
- Executive producers: Andy Heyward (season 1); Tetsuo Katayama (season 1); Jean Chalopin (season 2); Andy Heyward (season 2)
- Producers: Jean Chalopin (season 1); Denys Heroux (season 1); Lori Crawford (season 1); Andy Heyward (season 2); Tetsuo Katayama (season 2)
- Running time: 22 minutes
- Production companies: DIC Audiovisuel; McNaught Syndicate; LBS Communications; ICC TV Productions (season 1); Chris-Craft Television (season 2); United Entertainment Group (season 2)

Original release
- Network: First-run syndication (U.S.); FR3 (France)
- Release: September 3, 1984 – September 30, 1985

Related
- Heathcliff (1980)

Heathcliff (a.k.a. Heathcliff and the Catillac Cats, known as Les Entrechats in French) is a children's animated television series that debuted on September 3, 1984. Produced by DIC Audiovisuel (and later DIC Enterprises), it was the second animated series based on the Heathcliff comic strip (after Ruby-Spears' Heathcliff from 1980). 65 half-hour episodes aired in first-run syndication in the fall of 1984, followed by a second season of 21 episodes in 1985. The show continued to air in syndication until 1988. The Catillac Cats characters (identified in the end credits as Cats and Co.) were created by Jean Chalopin and Bruno Bianchi.

Mel Blanc, who provided the voice of Heathcliff in the Ruby-Spears series, reprised his role as the titular cat.

== Premise ==
Each episode featured two segments, one being about Heathcliff and his friends, while the other featured The Catillac Cats. At the end of every episode and before the end credits, Heathcliff or many other characters from the show would give out tips to viewers that are related to pet care.

The year after the series ended, the film Heathcliff: The Movie was released, which consisted of a compilation of segments.

== Cast ==
- Mel Blanc as Heathcliff
- Donna Christie as Cleo / Iggy
- Jeannie Elias as Marcy / Willie
- Stanley Jones as Riff-Raff / Wordsworth / Milkman
- Marilyn Lightstone as Sonja / Mrs. Nutmeg
- Danny Mann as Hector, Mr. Schultz
- Derek McGrath as Spike / Muggsy / Knuckles / Lefty
- Danny Wells as Bush / Raul
- Ted Zeigler as Leroy / Mungo / Mr. Nutmeg
- Peter Cullen as Pop / Additional Voices

== Crew ==
- Head writer: Alan Swayze
- Writers: Ann Elder, Doug Booth, Cynthia Chenault, Dan Dalton, Eliot Daro, Mike Dirham, Wilma Fraser, Evelyn Gabai, Mel Gilden, Chuck Lorre, George Hampton, Jack Hanrahan, Pamela Hickey, Walt Kubiak, Drew Laurence, Jim Makichuk, Dennys McCoy, Mike Moore, Charles Mulholland, Laura Numeroff, Mike O’Mahony, Leslie Page, Larry Parr, Bob Rosenfarb, David Schwartz, Mike Silvani, Bob Wilson
- Voice directors: Marsha Goodman, Victor Villegas (season 2)

== Episodes ==
=== Series overview ===
Season	Episodes	Originally released	
Season	Episodes	First released	Last released
1	65	September 3, 1984	November 30, 1984
2	21	September 2, 1985	September 30, 1985

=== Season 1 (1984) ===
No. overall	No. in season	Title	Original release date
1	1	"The Great Pussini" "Kitty Kat Kennels"	September 3, 1984
2	2	"Chauncey's Great Escape" "Carnival Capers"	September 4, 1984
3	3	"Mad Dog Catcher" "Circus Beserkus"	September 5, 1984
4	4	"Rebel Without a Claws" "The Farming Life Ain't for Me"	September 6, 1984
5	5	"Heathcliff's Middle Name" "Wishful Thinking"	September 7, 1984
6	6	"King of the Beasts" "Cat Can Do"	September 10, 1984
7	7	"Smoke Gets in my Eyes" "Much Ado About Bedding"	September 11, 1984
8	8	"City Slicker Cat" "House of the Future"	September 12, 1984
9	9	"Spike's Cousin" "For the Birds"	September 13, 1984
10	10	"Heathcliff's Pet" "Swamp Fever"	September 14, 1984
11	11	"Teed Off" "Monstro vs. the Wolf Hound"	September 17, 1984
12	12	"Say Cheese" "Cat's Angels"	September 18, 1984
13	13	"Meow Meow Island" "Iron Cats"	September 19, 1984
14	14	"Family Tree" "Who's Got the Chocolate?"	September 20, 1984
15	15	"Be Prepared" "Cruisin' for a Bruisin'"	September 21, 1984
16	16	"Heathcliff Gets Canned" "Whackoed Out"	September 24, 1984
17	17	"Brain Sprain" "Cat Balloon"	September 25, 1984
18	18	"May the Best Cat Win" "Comedy Cats"	September 26, 1984
Note: The DVD lists the episode May the Best Cat Win as first, and titles the episode Pilot.
19	19	"Revenge of the Kitty" "Jungle Vacation"	September 27, 1984
20	20	"Hospital Heathcliff" "Hector's Takeover"	September 28, 1984
21	21	"Going Shopping" "Cat in the Fat"	October 1, 1984
22	22	"Wild Cat Heathcliff" "Kitten Around"	October 2, 1984
23	23	"Cat Burglar Heathcliff" "Lucky's Unlucky Day"	October 3, 1984
24	24	"The Blizzard Bandit" "Harem Cat"	October 4, 1984
25	25	"Kitten Smitten" "Young Cat with a Horn"	October 5, 1984
26	26	"The Gang's All Here" "The Meowsic Goes Round & Round"	October 8, 1984
27	27	"Snow Job" "Condo Fever"	October 9, 1984
28	28	"Heathcliff Pumps Iron" "Mungo's Dilemma"	October 10, 1984
29	29	"Heathcliff's Double" "Big Foot"	October 11, 1984
30	30	"Terrible Tammy" "The Games of Love"	October 12, 1984
31	31	"Big Top Bungling" "Space Cats"	October 15, 1984
32	32	"Lard Times" "The Merry Pranksters"	October 16, 1984
33	33	"Spike's Slave" "Scaredy Cats"	October 17, 1984
34	34	"Gopher Broke" "A Camping We Will Go"	October 18, 1984
35	35	"Where There's an Ill, There's a Way" "Yes Sewer That's my Baby"	October 19, 1984
36	36	"Soap Box Derby" "A Better Mousetrap"	October 22, 1984
37	37	"Bamboo Island" "Superhero Mungo"	October 23, 1984
38	38	"Butter Up!" "Mungo Gets No Respect"	October 24, 1984
39	39	"Sonja's Nephew" "Dr. Mousetus"	October 25, 1984
40	40	"Cat Food for Thought" "Going South"	October 26, 1984
41	41	"Phantom of the Garbage" "Junkyard Flood"	October 29, 1984
42	42	"Trombone Terror" "The Other Woman"	October 30, 1984
43	43	"Pop on Parole" "The Babysitters"	October 31, 1984
44	44	"The Siamese Twins" "The Mungo Mash"	November 1, 1984
45	45	"Copa-ca-Heathcliff" "Leroy's in Love"	November 2, 1984
46	46	"Used Pets" "Search for a Star"	November 5, 1984
47	47	"An Officer and an Alley-Cat" "Hector Spector"	November 6, 1984
48	48	"Service with a Smile" "Junk Food"	November 7, 1984
49	49	"Boom Boom Pussini" "Beach Blanket Mungo"	November 8, 1984
50	50	"Sealand Mania" "Riff Raff the Gourmet"	November 9, 1984
51	51	"The Super M.A.C. Menace" "Journey to the Center of the Earth"	November 12, 1984
52	52	"A Piece of the Rock" "Divide and Clobber"	November 13, 1984
53	53	"Heathcliff Reforms" "Prehysteric Riff Raff"	November 14, 1984
54	54	"Flying High" "Debutante Ball"	November 15, 1984
55	55	"Heathcliff's Surprise" "The Big Break In"	November 16, 1984
56	56	"The Catfather" "The Big Swipe"	November 19, 1984
57	57	"Tally-Ho Heathcliff" "Cleo Moves In"	November 20, 1984
58	58	"Grandpa vs. Grandpa" "The Big Game Hunter"	November 21, 1984
59	59	"The Great Tuna Caper" "Peco's Treasure"	November 22, 1984
60	60	"The Baby Buggy Bad Guys" "Riff Raff's Mom"	November 23, 1984
61	61	"Momma's Back in Town" "Trash Dance"	November 26, 1984
62	62	"Claws" "Hector the Detector"	November 27, 1984
63	63	"Raiders of the Lost Cat" "Mungo Lays an Egg"	November 28, 1984
64	64	"The Home Wrecker" "In Search of Catlantis"	November 29, 1984
65	65	"Star of Tomeow-meow" "Soccer Anyone?"	November 30, 1984

=== Season 2 (1985) ===
No. overall	No. in season	Title	Original release date
66	1	"The Whitecliffs of Dover" "Life Saver"	September 2, 1985
67	2	"Nightmare in Beverly Hills" "The Cat in the Iron Mask"	September 3, 1985
68	3	"The Shrink" "Brushing Up"	September 4, 1985
69	4	"Dr. Heathcliff and Mr. Spike" "Time Warped"	September 5, 1985
70	5	"Spike's New Home" "Mungo's Big Romance"	September 6, 1985
71	6	"The Cat and the Pauper" "Mungo of the Jungle"	September 9, 1985
72	7	"In the Beginning" "Catlympic Cats"	September 10, 1985
73	8	"Rear Cat Window" "Cat Days, Ninja Nights"	September 11, 1985
74	9	"Something Fishy" "Christmas Memories"	September 12, 1985
75	10	"Heathcliff's Mom" "Hockey Pucks"	September 13, 1985
76	11	"Cat Day Afternoon" "Hector Protector"	September 16, 1985
77	12	"Feline Good" "Off-Road Racer"	September 17, 1985
78	13	"Spike's Coach" "The Trojan Catillac"	September 18, 1985
79	14	"Heathcliff Gets Framed" "Repo Cat"	September 19, 1985
80	15	"Missing in Action" "Bag Cat Sings the Blues"	September 20, 1985
81	16	"It's a Terrible Life" "Leroy Gets Canned"	September 23, 1985
82	17	"Hair of the Cat" "Tenting Tonight"	September 24, 1985
83	18	"The Fortune Teller" "Cottontails, Chickens, & Colored Eggs"	September 25, 1985
84	19	"Break an Egg" "A Letter to Granny"	September 26, 1985
85	20	"The New York City Sewer System" "High Goon"	September 27, 1985
86	21	"North Pole Cat" "He Ain't Heavy, He's My Brother"	September 30, 1985

== Theme song ==
The theme was composed and written by Haim Saban and Shuki Levy and sung by Noam Kaniel.

== Broadcast history ==
In the United States, the series was aired in national first-run syndication from September 3, 1984 to 1988, and then reruns of the series were aired on Nickelodeon from 1988 until 1993. The series then reran on Family Channel from 1993 to 1998 and Fox Family Channel for only a year from 1998 until 1999. From September 27, 2010 until September 23, 2011, reruns of the series were aired in the United States on the This Is for Kids block on This TV. Outside of Canada and the United States, the series was broadcast internationally on KidsCo, Fox Kids, and Jetix.

In the United Kingdom, the series first aired on the Children's BBC block on BBC One and was usually billed under the title Heathcliff Cats & Co. from 1988 until 1991. The "Cats & Co." name lasted until its last run on the BBC in 1991. The show then went over to Channel 4 and aired the show in the morning hours from 1990 until 1995. In 2000, the show went over to Toon Disney and began running the show shortly after its launch in the UK. However, during the same year back in the states, the show was aired in syndication on North American local stations in 2000 for a very short period of time, and went under its former BBC title Heathcliff Cats & Co. The series also aired in Japan. Back in the states, the series was aired on weekdays on Starz Encore Family (as of 2016). The show was also formerly broadcast in Colombia through the digital channel Tacho Pistacho until the channel's shutdown in 2019, and on Light TV in the United States from October 6, 2018 until September 30, 2019. As of 2026, the series began airing on MeTV Toons.

According to an interview with Donna Christie, the voice for Iggy Nutmeg and Cleo, the series did not continue because of Mel Blanc's failing health.

== Home media ==
In the 1980s, the series was released on VHS from RCA/Columbia Pictures Home Video and Golden Book Video, with releases from the latter being released under the DIC Video banner.

In February 2004, Sterling Entertainment released two VHS/DVD releases titled Terror of the Neighborhood and Fish Tales, each featuring six Heathcliff segments and a Catillac Cats segment. The DVD versions featured two additional Catillac Cats segments. On May 25, Sterling released Heathcliff: The Movie on DVD.

In 2004, General Mills offered free DVDs of DiC series with assorted episodes in cereal boxes, including Heathcliff.

In the UK, Maximum Entertainment released two volumes of the series in 2004. The first DVD/VHS contained 5 episodes, while the other DVD contained 3. A third one, released in 2008, contained 5 more episodes.

In September 2005, Shout! Factory released Heathcliff and The Catillac Cats in a 4-disc boxset featuring the first 24 episodes of the series in its original, complete and uncut television broadcast form. Shout! Factory has lost the rights to the series.

Throughout 2007–2009, NCircle Entertainment released eight Heathcliff DVDs.

In February 2012, Mill Creek Entertainment released Heathcliff- Season One, Volume 1 on DVD. This 3-disc set features the first 32 episodes from the Season 1 which includes a bonus episode of The Get Along Gang (originally The Busy World of Richard Scarry was meant to be the bonus episode). They also released a 10 episode best-of collection on that same day. Heathcliff- Season 1, Volume 2 was released on October 1, 2013, which contains the remaining 33 episodes from Season 1.

In August 2016, Mill Creek released Heathcliff – The Complete Series on DVD in Region 1. The 9-disc set contains all 86 episodes of the series, including the final 21 episodes which were previously unreleased.

The episode "Going Shopping / Cat in the Fat" was included as a bonus in the DVD release of the first half of the Beverly Hills Teens series.

In France, two more 4-disc sets were released under the French title of the series, Les Entrechats.

DVD name	Ep #	Release date
Heathcliff / Super Mario Bros.	2	2004
Heathcliff: Fish Tales	9	February 24, 2004
Heathcliff: Terror of the Neighborhood	9	February 24, 2004
Heathcliff: The Movie	1	May 25, 2004
Heathcliff & the Catillac Cats	24	September 20, 2005
Heathcliff – Season One, Volume One	32	February 21, 2012
Heathcliff – Season One, Volume Two	33	October 1, 2013
Heathcliff – The Complete Series	86	August 2, 2016

=== Streaming ===
Since August 2019, Heathcliff is available through Paramount+ (previously CBS All Access) in several countries.

== Compilation film ==
Heathcliff: The Movie was theatrically released on January 17, 1986, and subsequently on VHS in 1988 by Paramount Home Video. With an original frame story, it intersperses seven segments from the original series: "Cat Food for Thought", "Heathcliff's Double", "The Siamese Twins", "An Officer and an Alley Cat", "The Catfather", "Boom Boom Pussini", and "Pop on Parole".

== See also ==
- Garfield and Friends
