= George Gately =

American cartoonist (1928–2001)

George Gately Gallagher
- Born: December 21, 1928; Queens Village, Queens, New York, U.S.
- Died: September 30, 2001 (aged 72); Ridgewood, New Jersey, U.S.
- Other name: George Gallagher
- Occupations: Cartoonist, writer
- Relatives: John Gallagher (brother); Michael Gallagher (nephew)

George Gately Gallagher (December 21, 1928 – September 30, 2001), better known as George Gately, was an American cartoonist, best known as the creator of the Heathcliff comic strip.

Born in Queens Village, Queens, Gately came from a family of comics lovers. His father was an amateur doodler, and his elder brother John was also a cartoonist. He grew up and went to school in Bergenfield, New Jersey.

Gately studied art at Pratt Institute. After graduating, he worked at an advertising agency for 11 years, but commercial art gave him little satisfaction. Seeing the success of his elder brother, George decided to enter the cartoon field. In 1957, he sold his first comic. He dropped his last name of Gallagher to avoid confusion with his brother.

== Comic strips ==
In 1964, he created his first strip, Hapless Harry, which ran for a few years in several newspapers. He also created a strip called "Hippy" around 1967 featuring a curvaceous blonde flower child. It only ran until 1969, although it was advertised in E&P until 1970. But his most memorable creation came in 1973 in the form of a fat orange cat, Heathcliff. Heathcliff was an enormous success and was published in newspapers worldwide. To keep up with the demand, he recruited Bob Laughlin, and later his brother John to help draw the daily strips and Sunday color pages.

Heathcliff is distributed to over 1,000 newspapers by Creators Syndicate, who took over the strip from McNaught Syndicate in 1988. Gately gave up drawing in 1998. Heathcliff is now written and drawn by his nephew Peter Gallagher.

A resident of Upper Saddle River, New Jersey, Gately died of a heart attack on September 30, 2001, at the age of 72, at The Valley Hospital in Ridgewood, after months of deteriorating health.
