= The Catillac Cats =

Segment in the 1984 animated TV series Heathcliff

Riff-Raff and his girlfriend Cleo

The Catillac Cats is the name of a group of characters that starred in the secondary segment (officially billed Cats & Co. on the end credits) of the 1984 animated series of Heathcliff.

== Plot ==
Most episodes revolve around Riff-Raff's get-rich-quick schemes or searches for food.

== Main characters ==
=== The Gang ===
The segment stars a group of cats who live in a junkyard.

==== Riff-Raff ====
The group is headed by Riff-Raff (voiced by Stanley Jones), a tan, short, tough, streetwise alley cat. Riff-Raff is a suave cat who fancies himself incredibly debonair. He often has get-famous and/or get-rich-quick schemes, which form the basis of many of the episodes. He is always shown dressed with a blue scarf and a sideways cap.

==== Hector ====
Hector (voiced by Danny Mann), a brown and beige cat who speaks with a New Jersey accent, is sometimes depicted as feeling that he should be the head of the group, and becomes so on some occasions, such as in the episode "Hector's Takeover". Riff-Raff and Hector's conflicts form the basis of a number of episodes. He is always seen wearing a tie and a headband.

==== Wordsworth ====
Wordsworth

Wordsworth (voiced by Stanley Jones), named after poet William Wordsworth, is a light-gray cat who always speaks in rhyme, and wears roller skates, yellow headphones, and sunglasses.

==== Mungo ====
Mungo (voiced by Ted Zeigler) is a large, dim-witted gray cat who acts as a lackey for Riff-Raff. Mungo is often seen wearing a red shirt with a red winter hat. Though unintelligent, Mungo has astounding strength and fighting prowess. Mungo is a "gentle giant" and lighthearted in personality.

==== Cleo ====
Cleo (voiced by Donna Christie) is Riff-Raff's girlfriend, who lives in a music store. She is a cream-colored cat with long blonde hair. Her fur resembles a leotard and she wears a pair of pink legwarmers. In the flashback episode "Christmas Memories", it is revealed that Cleo is, in fact, one of the Catillac Cats herself, even going as far as to indicate that she coined the name. On more than one occasion, Riff-Raff ends up "two-timing" Cleo with another female cat (accidentally or otherwise).

== Association with Heathcliff ==
Although both Heathcliff and The Catillac Cats are set in the fictional city of Westfinster, only Hector, Wordsworth and Mungo appear in both segments. When the trio appears in Heathcliff episodes, Hector is depicted as the leader of the group. Cleo never appears in a Heathcliff episode, and neither Heathcliff nor any other characters from the Heathcliff series ever appear in a The Catillac Cats episode. Riff-Raff appears with Hector and Mungo in a crowd cheering for Heathcliff in season one, episode nine. The only time Heathcliff and Riff-Raff appear on-screen together is in the end credits, when Riff-Raff snatches his hat back from Heathcliff.

=== Appearances in the Heathcliff comics ===
The Catillac Cats (minus Wordsworth) appeared in a Heathcliff comic on July 20, 2016, which shows Heathcliff walking with them to the junkyard.

The Catillac Cats (including Wordsworth) reappeared once again in the Heathcliff comic on February 20, 2018, in which two garbage men witness Heathcliff and the Catillac Cats sharing stories about the 80s.

== Alternate title ==
In the end credits and on home videos, the Catillac Cats series is commonly referred to as Cats & Company, or Cats & Co., as seen in the end credits. Early Heathcliff VHS releases used the spelling "The Cadillac Cats", until DiC put out an all 'Cats & Co' tape, which included the first use of the spelling "The Catillac Cats".
