= Enhanced Traffic Management System =

The Enhanced Traffic Management System (ETMS) is a product for the Federal Aviation Administration (FAA) developed to monitor and react to air traffic congestion in both real time and in the future. The system is capable of issuing ground delay programs (GDPs) and ground stop programs (GSs). Ground delay programs are instituted on a particular airport or group of airports to alleviate volume or if there is severe weather.

The system works much like a hub and spoke system where an ETMS hubsite will send and receive data to and from many remote sites. The hubsites report directly to Air Traffic Control System Command Center in Warrenton, Virginia.

ETMS hubsites generate the data used by ASDI (Aircraft Situation Display to Industry).

Other organizations (e.g., the airlines, Department of Defense, NASA, and international sites) also have access to the ETMS software and/or data.
