= October 2017 Northern California wildfires =

2017 wildfires in Northern California

- Copernicus Sentinel-3A satellite picture, October 9
- Date: October 8–31, 2017 (contained)
- Location: Northern California

Statistics
- Total fires: 250
- Total area: At least 245,000 acres (99,148 ha)

Impacts
- Deaths: 44 civilians
- Injuries: 192
- Structures lost: 8,900
- Cost: ~$14.5 billion (2017 USD)

Location of Northern California wildfires

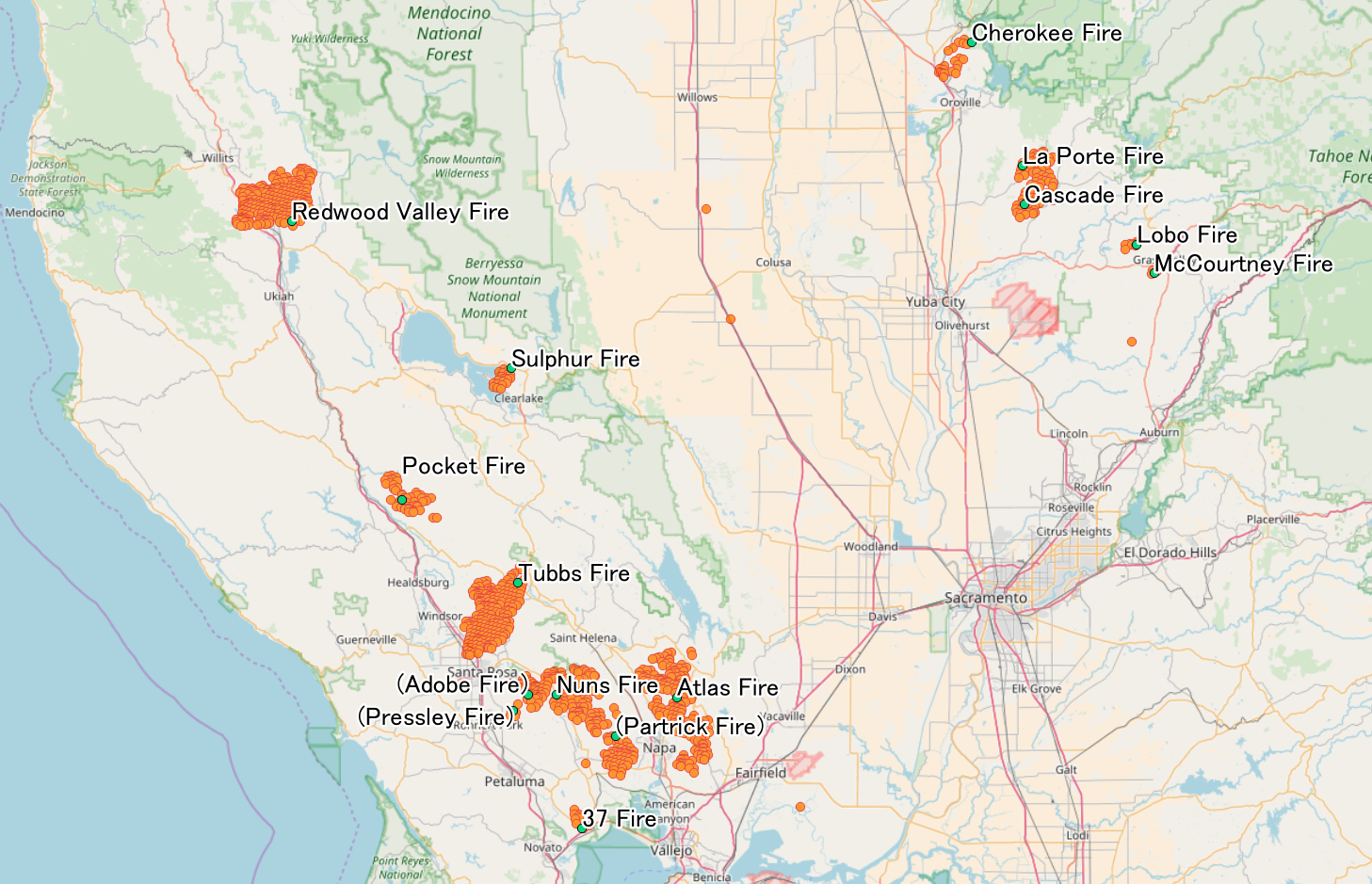
The 2017 Northern California wildfires from October 7 to October 14

The October 2017 Northern California wildfires, also known as the Northern California firestorm, North Bay Fires, and the Wine Country Fires were a series of 250 wildfires that started burning across the state of California, United States, beginning in early October. Twenty-one became major fires that burned at least 245,000 acres (99,148 ha).

The wildfires broke out throughout Napa, Lake, Sonoma, Mendocino, Butte, and Solano Counties during severe fire weather conditions, effectively leading to a major red flag warning for much of the Northern California area. Pacific Gas and Electric reported that red flag conditions existed in 44 of the 49 counties in its service area. Seventeen separate wildfires were reported at that time. These fires included the Tubbs Fire (which grew to become the most destructive wildfire in the history of California up until that time - fires in 2018 were more destructive), the Atlas Fire, Nuns Fire, and others.

These wildfires were also the most destructive ones of the 2017 California wildfire season. The October 2017 fires were the costliest group of wildfires on record at the time, causing around $14.5 billion (2017 USD) in damages, including $11 billion in insured losses and $1.5 billion in fire suppression costs, surpassing the 1991 Oakland firestorm, which until then had been the single costliest fire on record. In addition, the Northern California fires were predicted to cost the US economy at least $85 billion. In 2018, the Camp Fire surpassed the October 2017 fires to become the single-costliest fire on record, causing an estimated $16.5 billion (2018 USD) in property damage.

Owing to the extreme conditions, shortly after the fires ignited on October 8 and 9, they rapidly grew to become extensive, full-scale incidents spanning from 1,000 acres (400 hectares) to well over 20,000 acres (8,100 ha), each within a single day. By October 14, the fires had burned more than 210,000 acres (85,000 ha) while forcing 90,000 people to evacuate from their homes. In total, the Northern California fires killed 44 people and hospitalized at least 192 others, making this one of the deadliest wildfire events in the United States during the past century.

== Weather ==
Days prior to the wildfires, the National Weather Service had begun issuing red-flag warnings throughout much of northern California as conditions were expected to become extremely volatile, with winds expected to be gusting between 25 and 35 miles per hour (40 and 56 km/h) from the north to the south. By the evening of October 8, the Diablo winds were reported gusting up to 70 miles per hour (110 km/h) within the affected areas as over a dozen wildfires began to break out.

== Impact and reaction ==
Many of those killed in the fires are believed to have died late on October 8 or early on October 9, 2017, when most of the fires broke out overnight. Most of the victims were elderly, though the ages of the victims ranged from 14 to 100 years old.

On October 9, California governor Jerry Brown declared a state of emergency for the counties of Napa, Sonoma, Yuba, Butte, Lake, Mendocino, Nevada, and Orange, and sent a letter to the White House requesting a major disaster declaration. President Donald Trump approved the disaster declaration on October 10. That evening, Governor Brown issued an emergency declaration for Solano County. Surveying the region, representative Mike Thompson of California's 5th congressional district said, "I fully expect this will be the worst fire disaster in California history."

More than 10,000 firefighters battled the blaze, using more than 1,000 fire engines and other equipment, with crews arriving from as far away as Canada and Australia.

Pacific Gas and Electric Company (PG&E) reported mobilizing 4,300 workers to restore power. It also said that more than 350,000 customers had lost electric service and 42,000 customers gas service since the wildfires began on October 8. By October 14, PG&E had restored electricity to 92% and gas service to 16,800 of the customers affected.

Reinsurance broker Aon Benfield stated that these are the costliest wildfires in U.S. history, with an estimated eight billion U.S. dollars in insured losses. The largest portion of these losses was to residential property. Additional losses were to automobiles, commercial property including business interruption insurance, and to crops. Many of the losses were in urban areas not historically prone to wildfire exposure.

=== Air pollution ===
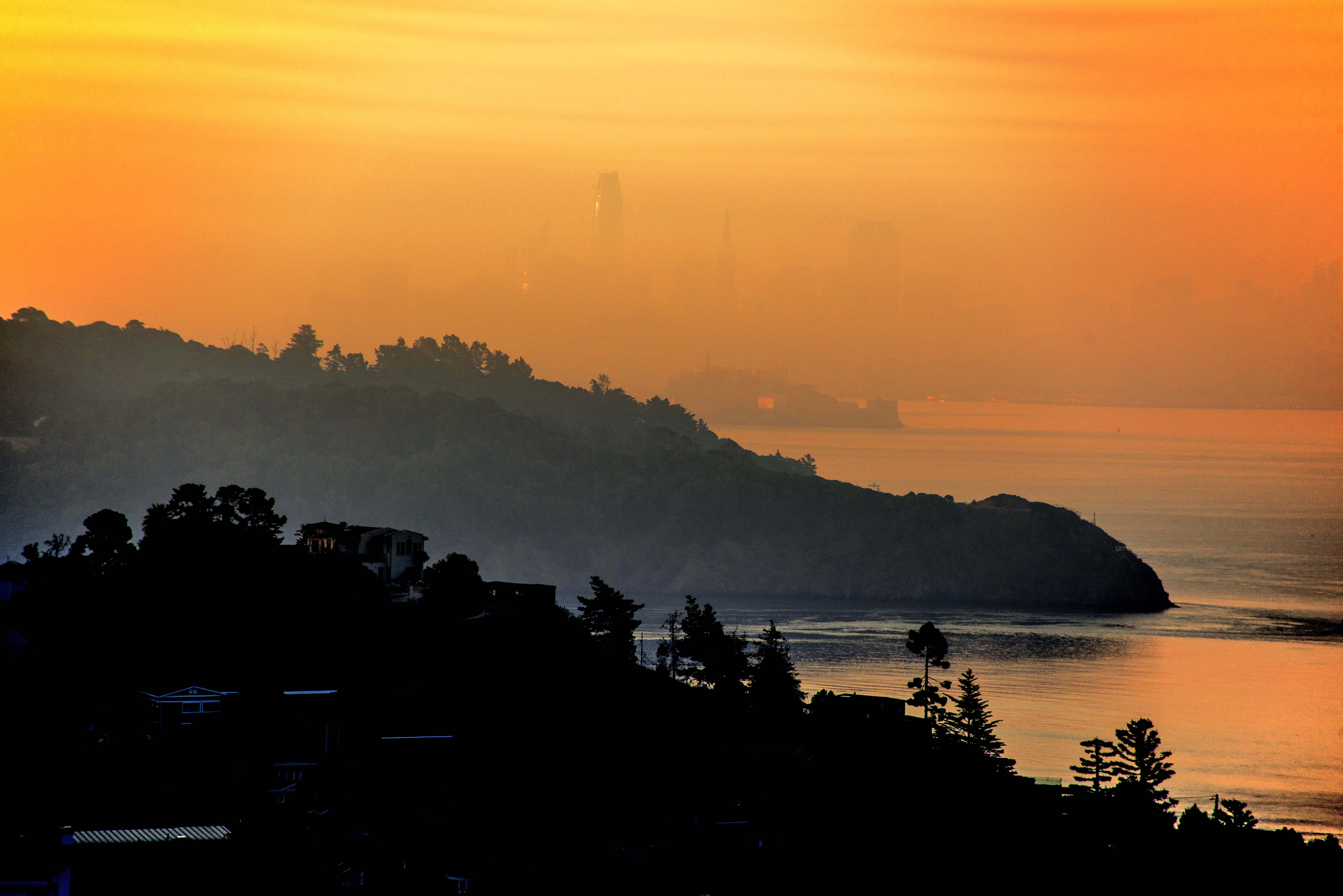
The wildfires caused severe air quality problems around the Bay Area.

By October 12, the air quality in the city of Napa was ranked the poorest in the nation, due to high levels of particulates and ozone. By October 13, air quality in the city reached the "hazardous" level, the most dangerous on the Environmental Protection Agency scale. In Solano County, over 250 people were sickened by smoke inhalation, and sought care at hospitals. Twenty-three were admitted to emergency rooms.

By October 12, smoke from the wildfires had spread nearly 100 miles, with "unhealthy" air quality indices registered in the cities of Oakland, San Francisco, and San Rafael. Due to the poor air quality, San Francisco State University canceled classes, and outdoor activities were canceled in a number of cities, including Danville, Palo Alto, and Walnut Creek. Visibility issues spurred the Federal Aviation Administration to implement a ground delay program at San Francisco International Airport, and nearly 280 flights were canceled over a three-day period. Over a week after the fires started, flights continued to be canceled and delayed due to poor visibility from the smoke.

== Fires ==
Name	County	Acres	Start date	Containment date	Deaths	Notes	Ref
Cherokee	Butte	8,417	October 8, 2017	October 16, 2017			
Atlas	Napa, Solano	51,624	October 8, 2017	October 28, 2017	6	781 structures destroyed, 120 structures damaged	
Tubbs	Napa, Sonoma	36,807	October 8, 2017	October 31, 2017	22	5,643 structures destroyed, 317 structures damaged, 1 injured	
Nuns	Napa, Sonoma	56,556	October 8, 2017	October 30, 2017	3	Merged with the Norrbom, Adobe, Partrick, Pressley, and Oakmont Fires. 1,355 structures destroyed	
Redwood Valley	Mendocino	36,523	October 9, 2017	October 26, 2017	9	545 structures destroyed, 43 injured	
La Porte	Butte	6,151	October 9, 2017	October 19, 2017			
Cascade	Yuba	9,989	October 9, 2017	October 19, 2017	4	143 residential and 123 outbuildings destroyed	
Sulphur	Lake	2,207	October 9, 2017	October 26, 2017		150 structures destroyed	
37 Fire	Sonoma	1,660	October 9, 2017	October 12, 2017		25 structures destroyed, 55 structures damaged	
Pocket	Sonoma	17,357	October 9, 2017	October 31, 2017			
Lobo	Nevada	821	October 9, 2017	October 18, 2017		At least 30 structures destroyed	
Bear	Santa Cruz	391	October 16, 2017	October 27, 2017		4 structures destroyed, 7 injuries	

=== Cherokee Fire ===
The Cherokee Fire broke out on the evening of Sunday, October 8, near Oroville in Butte County just after 9 PM PDT. Reportedly igniting near Cherokee Road, the fire quickly expanded from hundreds to thousands of acres within a few hours of burning as it threatened nearby Oroville and surrounding rural neighborhoods.

=== Atlas Fire ===
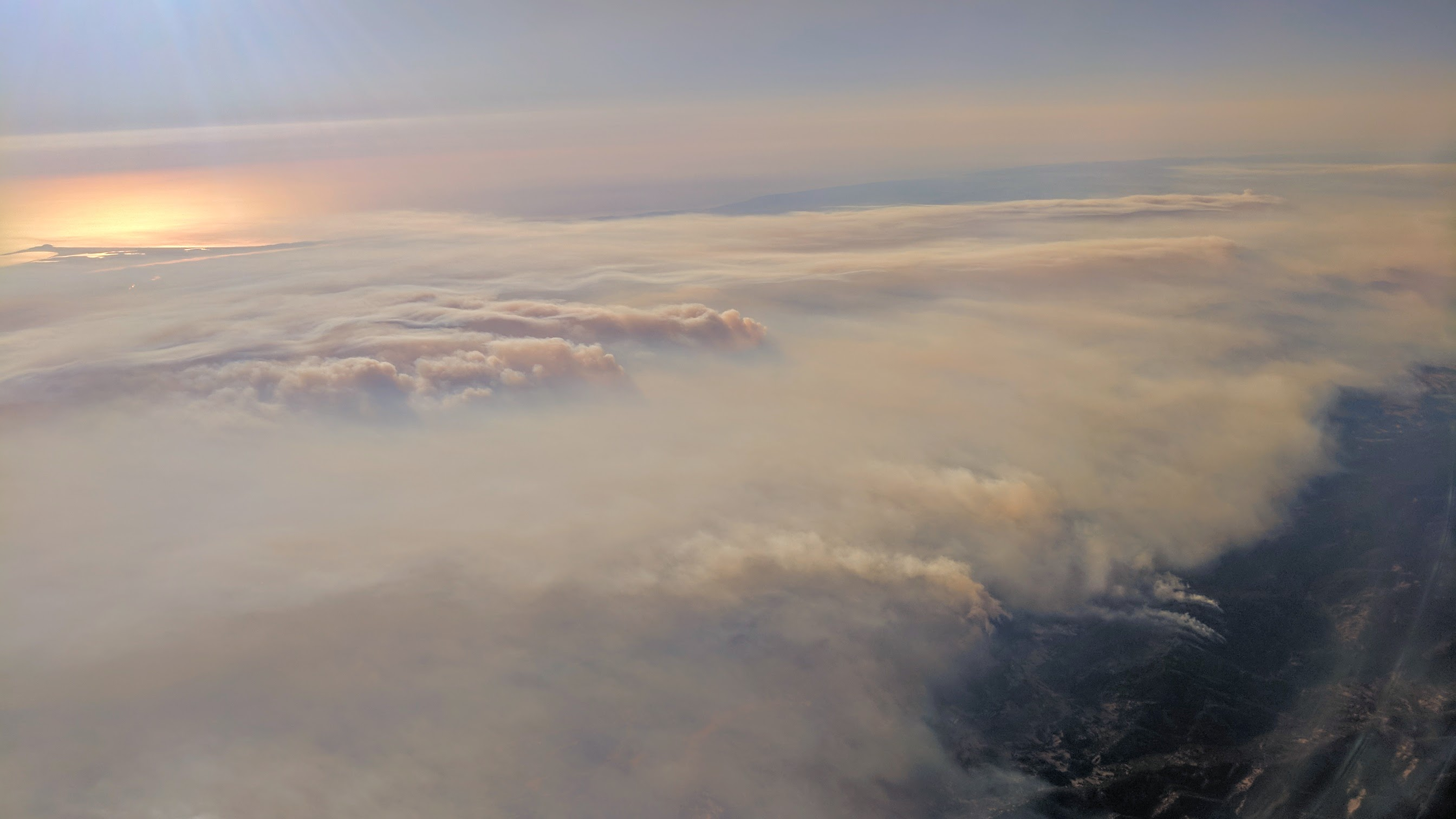
Aerial view of smoke from the 2017 fires in Napa and Sonoma Counties, California, on October 12 from near the south end of Lake Berryessa, nearest to the Atlas fire and looking toward the Nuns fire. Point Reyes is visible in the distance.

The Atlas Fire burned Napa County, north of the city of Napa, near Napa Soda Springs. On October 29, the fire had burned 51,057 acres (20,662 ha) and was 100% contained.

=== Tubbs Fire ===
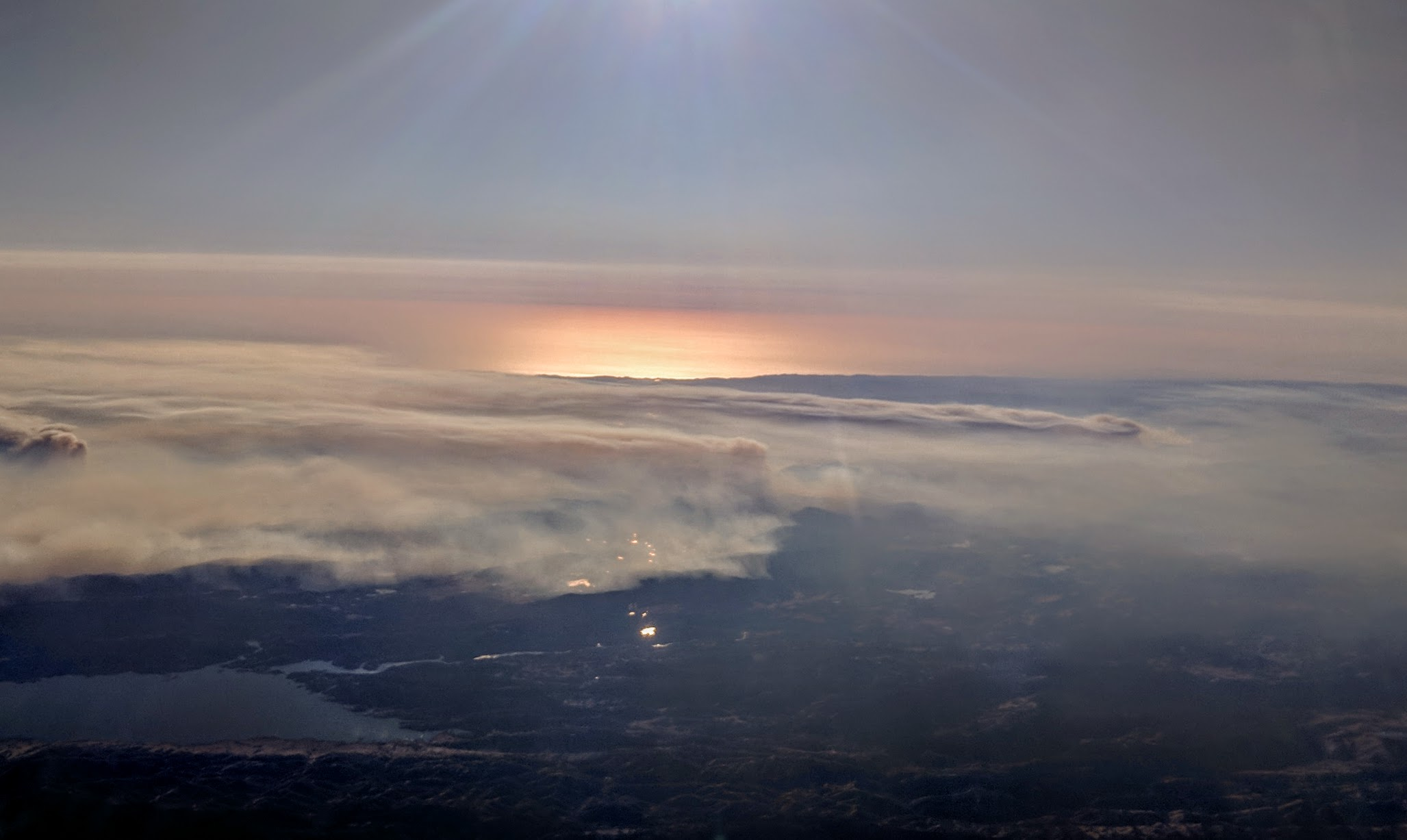
Aerial view of smoke from the Tubbs and Pocket fires, with the north end of Lake Berryessa, October 12

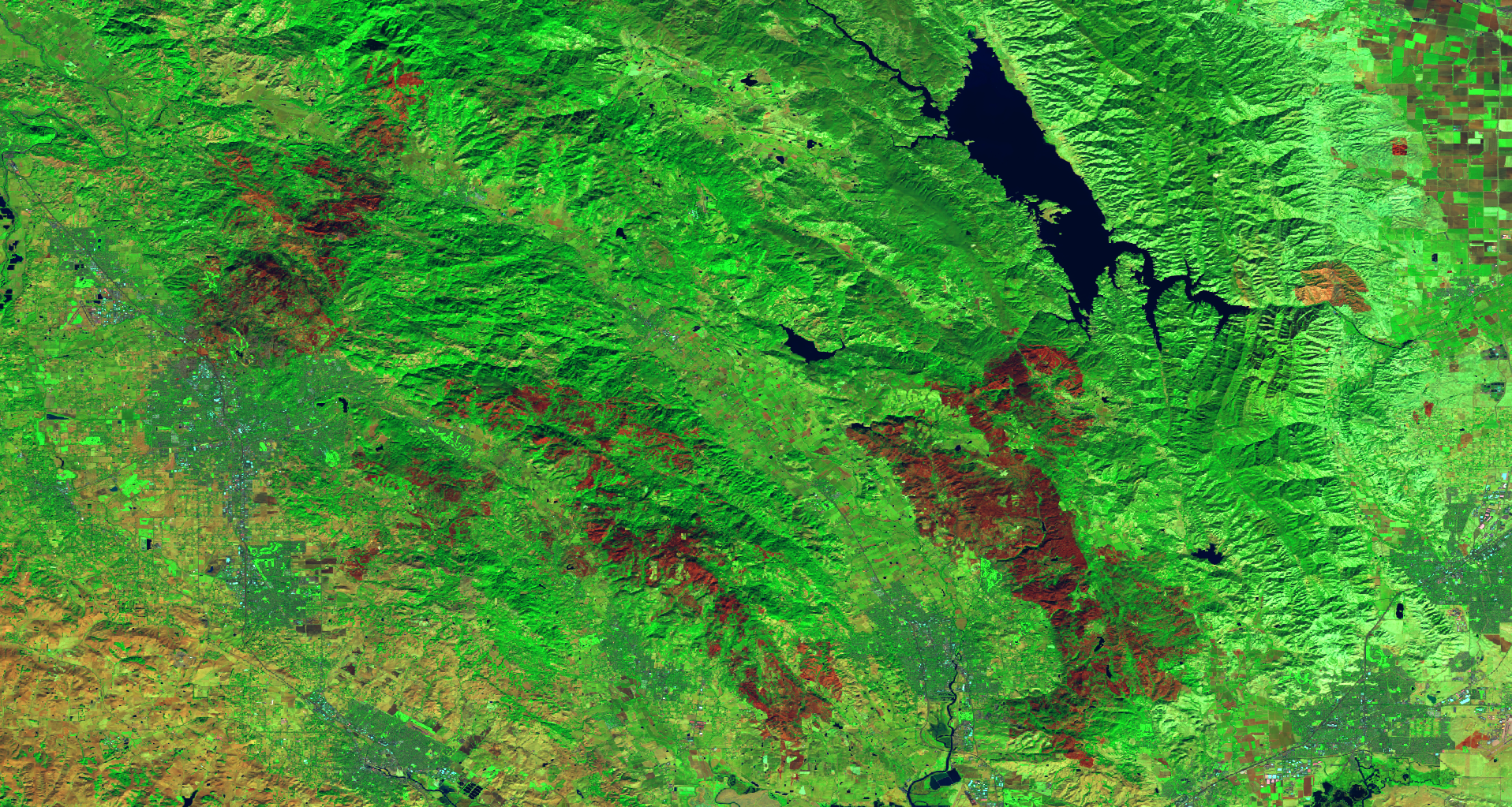
Landsat 8 OLI bands 753, Napa, Sonoma fires of October 2017

The Tubbs Fire started near Tubbs Lane in Calistoga on the evening of October 8, 2017, and burned at least 34,000 acres (13,759 ha). In the Fountain Grove area numerous homes, the Fountaingrove Inn, the historic Round Barn, and a Hilton resort were destroyed. By October 14, the death toll from this fire alone had risen to 20. By October 20, the Tubbs Fire had become the most destructive wildfire in the history of California. This was later surpassed by the Camp Fire (2018).

A filing by PG&E to the judge overseeing PG&E's probation for the 2010 San Bruno fire said that the Tubbs Fire may have started with privately owned equipment on private property for which PG&E was not responsible.

=== Nuns Fire ===
The Nuns Fire, centered in the areas to the east and north of the city of Sonoma, merged with the Norrbom fire on October 11. The Adobe fire merged with Nuns/Norrbom on October 12. The Partrick fire joined the four-fire conflagration on October 13. By October 16, the combined fire, which now also included the Pressley fire, covered over 48,000 acres (19,000 ha). On October 18, the Oakmont Fire merged into the Nuns Fire, and the combined fire grew to over 54,000 acres (22,000 ha) in size.

== Investigation ==
Based on the investigation by CalFire, it has been found that Pacific Gas & Electric equipment was the cause of all of the individual fires except for the Tubbs Fire. In January 2019 CalFire determined the Tubbs Fire was caused by incorrectly maintained electrical equipment owned by a private landowner. However, in August 2019 a fast-track jury trial was scheduled to revisit whether or not PG&E was the cause of the Tubbs Fire.

News media noted reports of wind-damaged power equipment around the time the fires were starting. Pacific Gas & Electric stated that strong winds had affected the utility's power lines in the North Bay area on late October 8 and early October 9. A California Department of Forestry and Fire Protection (CAL FIRE) spokesperson stated that investigators were considering this among other possible causes.

The California Public Utilities Commission sent PG&E a notification to preserve equipment, emails, and documents relevant to the utility's tree-trimming program.

CAL FIRE Director Ken Pimlott discouraged premature speculation of causes, stating that, "The facts will come out when the investigations are done."

== Wildfire victim claims ==
On July 1, 2020, the PG&E Fire Victim Trust (FVT) was established as part of the reorganization plan of the 2019 bankruptcy of PG&E to administer the claims of the wildfire victims. Also on July 1, PG&E funded the Fire Victim Trust (FVT) with $5.4 billion in cash and 22.19% of stock in the reorganized PG&E, which covers most of the obligations of its settlement for the wildfire victims. PG&E has two more payments totaling $1.35 billion in cash, scheduled to be paid in January 2021 and January 2022, to complete its obligations to the wildfire victims.

Claimants are wildfire victims from the 2017 North Bay Fires, 2015 Butte Fire, and 2018 Camp Fire in Northern California. The 2017 Tubbs Fire is considered to be one of the 2017 North Bay Fires. The court case for the Tubbs Fire was superseded by the PG&E Restructuring Support Agreement (RSA) of December 9, 2019 and by the PG&E bankruptcy reorganization plan, wherein PG&E accepted liability for the Tubbs Fire.

== See also ==
- 2017 California wildfires
  - December 2017 Southern California wildfires
- October 2007 California wildfires
- Oakland firestorm of 1991
- Recloser
- Witch Fire
- San Diego Gas and Electric
- Pacific Gas and Electric
- Utility-caused wildfires
