= CTOT =

The abbreviation CTOT can mean:

- The Canadian Trade Office in Taipei
- In aviation, a Calculated Take-Off Time. See Air traffic flow management.
- Constant Torque On Take-off
