= Atlas Fire =

2017 wildfire in Northern California

- Part of the 2017 North Bay wildfires
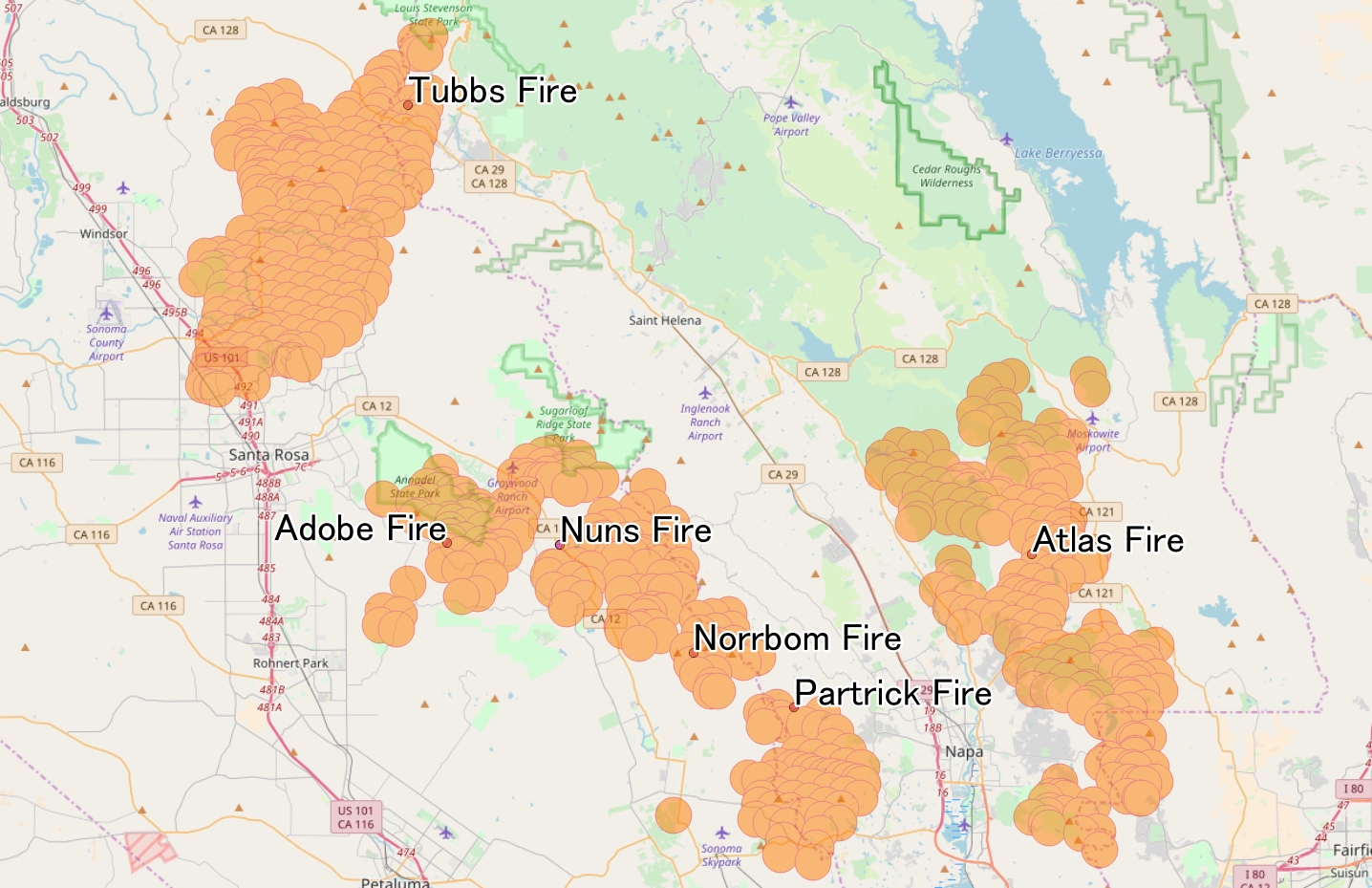
- Atlas fire and adjacent fires
- Date: October 8, 2017 –; October 28, 2017
- Location: Napa County, California
- Coordinates: 38.39206°N 122.24367°W

Statistics
- Burned area: 51,057 acres (207 km^{2})

Impacts
- Deaths: 6
- Structures destroyed: 781

Location of Atlas Fire

The Atlas Fire was a 2017 wildfire burning in Napa County, California north of the city of Napa, near Napa Soda Springs. It was one of fourteen large fires simultaneously burning in eight Northern California counties, in what was called the "Northern California firestorm". Governor Jerry Brown declared a state of emergency.

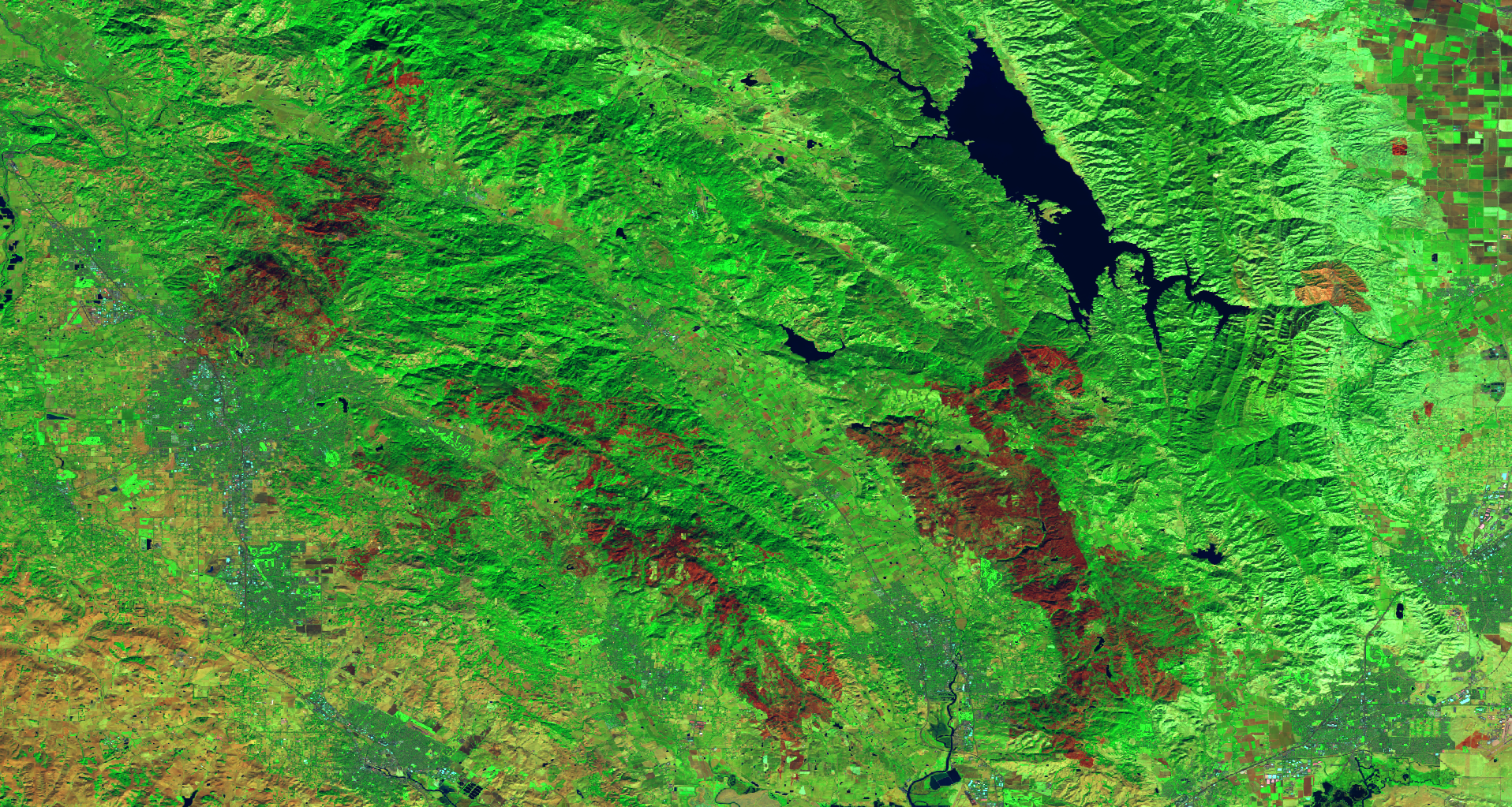
Landsat 8 OLI bands 753, Napa, Sonoma fires of October 2017

The fire, which started on October 8, had by October 12 burned 51,057 acres (207 km^{2}) of land, and was 77% contained. By October 12, the fire stretched from Lake Berryessa south to Napa, but a firebreak was established across Atlas Peak Road. It was contained on October 27, 2017. At that point in state history, the fire was the 14th most destructive and 15th deadliest. It burned a total of 51,624 acres, destroyed 783 structures, and resulted in 6 deaths.

== Progression ==
The fire began about 10 p.m. October 8 on Atlas Peak Road Atlas Peak. It started south, fed by winds, gusting to 28 miles per hour, and low relative humidity at 12%.

On October 12, winds were forecast to reach 40 mph, but were lighter than expected, slowing the growth of the fire.

The fire was eventually contained on the night of October 27.

== Evacuations ==
Evacuations started at Silverado Resort, and at Vichy Avenue and Hagen Road area, then Montecito Boulevard and later at Monte Vista Avenue.

After the evacuation center at Crosswalk Church quickly reached maximum capacity, one was opened at Napa Valley College and St. Apollinaris Catholic Church. There are other evacuations centers such as:

- Allan Witt Park, 1741 W Texas St, Fairfield,
- Solano Community College, 4000 Suisun Valley Rd, Fairfield, and
- Fairfield High School, 205 E. Atlantic Avenue, Fairfield.
- Sonoma Raceway open their campgrounds.

The evacuations for Solano County are Upper and Lower Green Valley, Eastridge, and the community of twin sisters along Suisun Valley road. The advisory is for the Lakes, and The Shopping Centers for Cordelia. In Sonoma, there were mandatory evacuation orders first at Seventh Street East, Castle Road, and Lovall Valley Road; then at East Napa Street. An evacuation advisory was issued for parts of the city of Napa.

== See also ==
- Tubbs Fire
- 2017 California wildfires
- List of California wildfires
- October 2017 Northern California wildfires
