= Air traffic flow management =

Air traffic regulation technique

Air traffic flow management (ATFM) is the strategic process of managing aircraft flow to prevent airports and air traffic control sectors from exceeding their capacity. At its core, ATFM balances air traffic demand against the system's limitations to ensure safety and maximize the efficient use of the entire airspace, a process also known as Air Traffic Flow and Capacity Management (ATFCM).

== Airport Capacity ==
Because only one aircraft can land or depart from a runway at a given time, and because aircraft must be separated by a certain distance or time to avoid collisions, every airport has a finite capacity; it can safely handle only so many aircraft per hour. This capacity depends on many factors, such as the number of runways available, layout of taxi tracks, availability of air traffic control, and current or anticipated weather conditions. The weather can cause large variations in capacity: strong winds may limit the number of runways available, and poor visibility may necessitate greater separation between aircraft.

When an air traffic control unit that will control a flight reaches capacity, arriving aircraft are directed towards holding patterns where they circle until it is their turn to land. However, aircraft flying in holding patterns is an inefficient and costly way of delaying aircraft, so it is preferable to keep them on the ground at their place of departure, called a ground delay program. This way, the delay can be waited out on the ground with engines off, saving considerable amounts of fuel. The careful calculation of en route times for each flight and traffic flow as a whole, which aims to minimize overall delays in the air traffic system, is highly dependent on computers.

== Operation in the U.S. ==
=== Traffic Management System (TMS): 1970 to 1990 ===
In 1969, the FAA established an experimental air flow control center, and in 1970 established the Air Traffic Control Systems Command Center (ATCSCC) to integrate four previously distinct offices.

In 1983, the FAA selected Computer Sciences Corporation to begin a phased upgrading and expansion of the existing Traffic Management System. The system's IBM 9020 central computer at the FAA Technical Center (Pomona, New Jersey) was replaced with an IBM 4321 and connected to computer terminals at ATCSCC, together with installation of dedicated two-way communication lines between ATCSCC and the area control centers. These improvements allowed ATCSCC to anticipate and manage volume at specific airports.

=== Traffic Flow Management System (TFMS): 2010 to present ===
April 2022 overview of Traffic Flow Management (TFMS) shortfalls compared with planned Flow Management Data and Services (FMDS) advantages & opportunities

In 2010, Traffic Flow Management System (TFMS) became the primary automatic system for air traffic flow management in the U.S.

=== Flow Management Data and Services (FMDS): under development ===
Flow Management Data and Services (FMDS) is a planned next-generation decision support system to address known TFMS shortfalls and opportunities for improvement. These have included aging architecture, usability and software integration inefficiencies, availability and reliability limitations, expensive maintenance, fragmented data integration, lack of a comprehensive failover strategy, and deficiencies in situational awareness for air traffic controllers. As of 2022, expected deployment was in 2027.

== Operation in Europe ==
All IFR flight plans are tracked by the Central Flow Management Unit (CFMU). Every airport and air traffic control sector has a published maximum capacity. When capacity is exceeded, measures are taken to reduce the traffic. This is termed regulation. The aim is to use capacity effectively, keeping the average delay as low as possible, while ensuring capacity is not exceeded.

For example, if two flights are scheduled to arrive at an airport at exactly the same time, and the airport can handle one aircraft every five minutes, the aircraft may be assigned delays to ensure that the second aircraft arrives five minutes after the first. Similarly, the first aircraft will be required to depart on schedule and not allowed to depart late. This way, the second aircraft will not need to enter a holding pattern before landing.

== See also ==
- Bay of Bengal Cooperative Air Traffic Flow Management System (BOBCAT)
