= Bobcat (disambiguation) =

Bobcat is a species of wild cat in North America.

Bobcat may also refer to:

== Computing ==
- HP Bobcat, a minicomputer
- Bobcat (microarchitecture), AMD computer processor architecture

== Culture ==
- Bobcat (rapper), American rapper, "Do it"(1989)
- Bobcat (musician), American pop musician, "We Live for the Music" album(2011)
- Bobcat Goldthwait (b. 1962), American actor, comedian, screenwriter, and film and television director
- "Bobcat (Space Ghost Coast to Coast)", an episode of Space Ghost Coast to Coast
- Bubsy the Bobcat, main protagonist of the Bubsy video game series

== Military devices ==
- Beretta 21 Bobcat, a handgun
- Bobcat (armored personnel carrier)

== Transportation ==
- Mercury Bobcat, American subcompact car
- Skid-steer loader, a compact construction/utility vehicle often nicknamed "bobcat"
- Cessna AT-17 Bobcat, aircraft
- Bay of Bengal Cooperative Air Traffic Flow Management System

== Organizations ==
- Bobcat Company, a manufacturer of farm and construction equipment, mainly skid steer loaders

== Sports ==
- Cynthia Lynch (b. 1971) or Bobcat, American professional wrestler
- Bob McCown (b. 1952), or The Bobcat, U.S.-born sports talk show host from Toronto
- Bournemouth Bobcats, English American football team in Bournemouth, Dorset
- Charlotte Bobcats, former name of Charlotte Hornets, professional basketball team in Charlotte, North Carolina
- Ohio Bobcats, several varsity teams at Ohio University
- Montana State Bobcats, varsity sports teams at Montana State University, Bozeman, Montana
- Quinnipiac Bobcats, varsity sports teams of Quinnipiac University
- Texas State Bobcats, varsity sports teams at Texas State University, San Marcos, Texas
- Bobcat, mascot of the NYU Violets, the varsity sports team at New York University

== Other ==
- Bobcat, the joining rank in Cub Scouting (Boy Scouts of America)
- Bobcat (roller coaster), a wooden roller coaster at Six Flags Great Escape
- Bobcat, U.S. Secret Service code name for JD Vance
- "bobtail" is a tractor unit.
