= Tubbs Fire =

2017 wildfire in Northern California

- Part of the 2017 North Bay wildfires
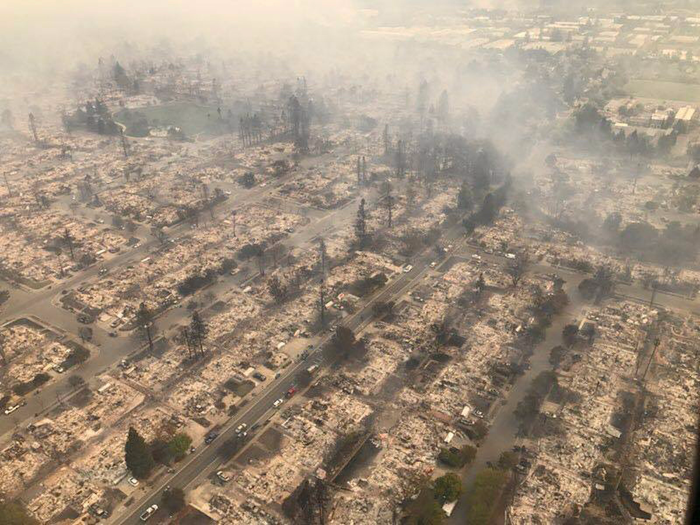
- Destroyed homes in the Coffey Park neighborhood
- Date: October 8, 2017 –; October 31, 2017
- Location: Sonoma County, California, Napa County, California, U.S.
- Coordinates: 38.60895°N 122.62879°W

Statistics
- Burned area: 36,807 acres (149 km^{2})

Impacts
- Deaths: 22
- Injuries: 1
- Structures lost: 5,643 structures
- Cost: ~$1.3 billion (2017 USD)

Ignition
- Cause: Failure of private electrical system

Location of Tubbs Fire

The Tubbs Fire was a wildfire in Northern California during October 2017. At the time, the Tubbs Fire was the most destructive wildfire in California history, burning parts of Napa, Sonoma, and Lake counties, inflicting its greatest losses in the city of Santa Rosa. Its destructiveness was surpassed only a year later by the Camp Fire of 2018. The Tubbs Fire was one of more than a dozen large fires that broke out in early October 2017, which were simultaneously burning in eight Northern California counties, in what was called the "Northern California firestorm". By the time of its containment on October 31, the fire was estimated to have burned 36,810 acres (149 km^{2}); at least 22 people were believed to have been killed in Sonoma County by the fire.

The fire started near Tubbs Lane in the rural northern part of Calistoga, in Napa County. It destroyed more than 5,643 structures, half of which were homes in Santa Rosa. Santa Rosa's economic loss from the Tubbs Fire was estimated at $1.2 billion (2017 USD), with five percent of the city's housing stock destroyed. The Tubbs Fire also incurred an additional $100 million in fire suppression costs.

After an investigation lasting over a year, the California Department of Forestry and Fire Protection (Cal Fire) determined that the Tubbs Fire was "caused by a private electrical system adjacent to a residential structure" and that there had been no violations of the state's Public Resources Code. However, the Pacific Gas and Electric Company (PG&E) later agreed to settle victims' claims as part of a general $13.5 billion bankruptcy plan involving liabilities from other wildfires, and also issued payments to Sonoma County and the city of Santa Rosa as part of a separate settlement with local governments.

== Progression ==
=== October 8 ===
The Tubbs Fire started near Tubbs Lane in Calistoga, around 9:43 p.m. on Sunday, October 8. The first public officer on scene was a police officer from the Calistoga Police Department, who documented the fire. As it and other North Bay fires began to spread, Sonoma County emergency dispatchers sent fire crews to at least 10 reports of downed power lines and exploding transformers. In northern Santa Rosa, the peak wind gusts at 9:29 p.m. hit 30 mph; an hour later, they were 41 mph.

Pushed by strong winds from the northeast, the front of the fire moved more than twelve miles in its first three hours. The Mark West Springs area, north of Santa Rosa in unincorporated Sonoma County, was directly in the path of the fire. Notably, over a thousand animals at the Safari West Wildlife Preserve remained unharmed, saved by owner Peter Lang, who, aged 76, single-handedly fought back the flames for more than 10 hours, using only garden hoses.

Sonoma County officials could have sent out an emergency alert to every cellphone in the region on Sunday night as the fire grew, but chose not to, saying such a widespread alarm would have hampered emergency efforts. Instead, location based SMS and email alerts were broadcast – the first of these text messages going out at 10:51 pm, using a system called SoCo Alerts to notify people via cellphone; both are limited to those who sign up for these services. Officials also used a reverse 911 system that called landlines in certain areas. At 11:58 pm, firefighters called for an evacuation order encompassing the area between the cities of Calistoga and Santa Rosa.

=== October 9 ===
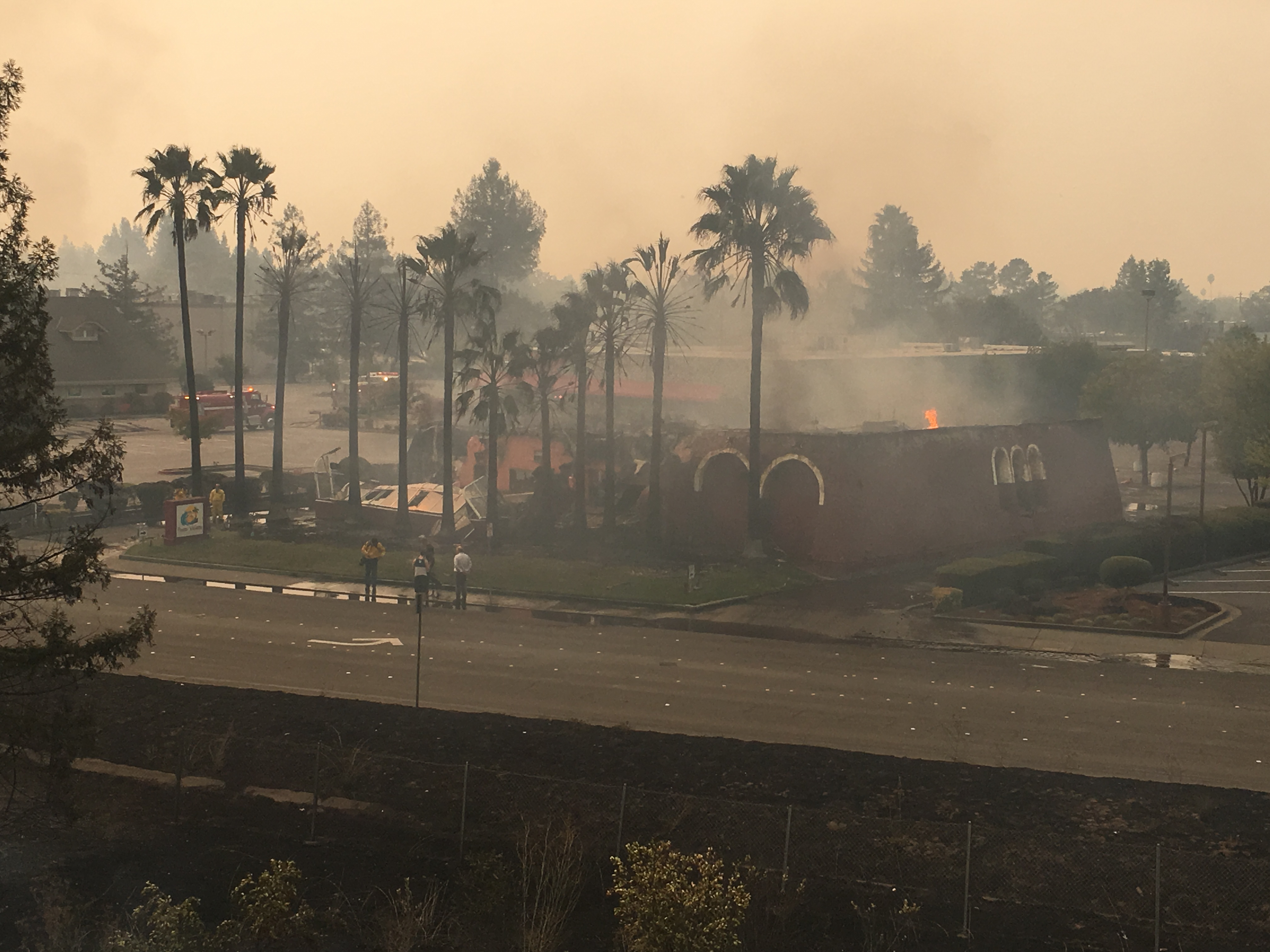
The Puerto Vallarta restaurant burns on October 9, 2017

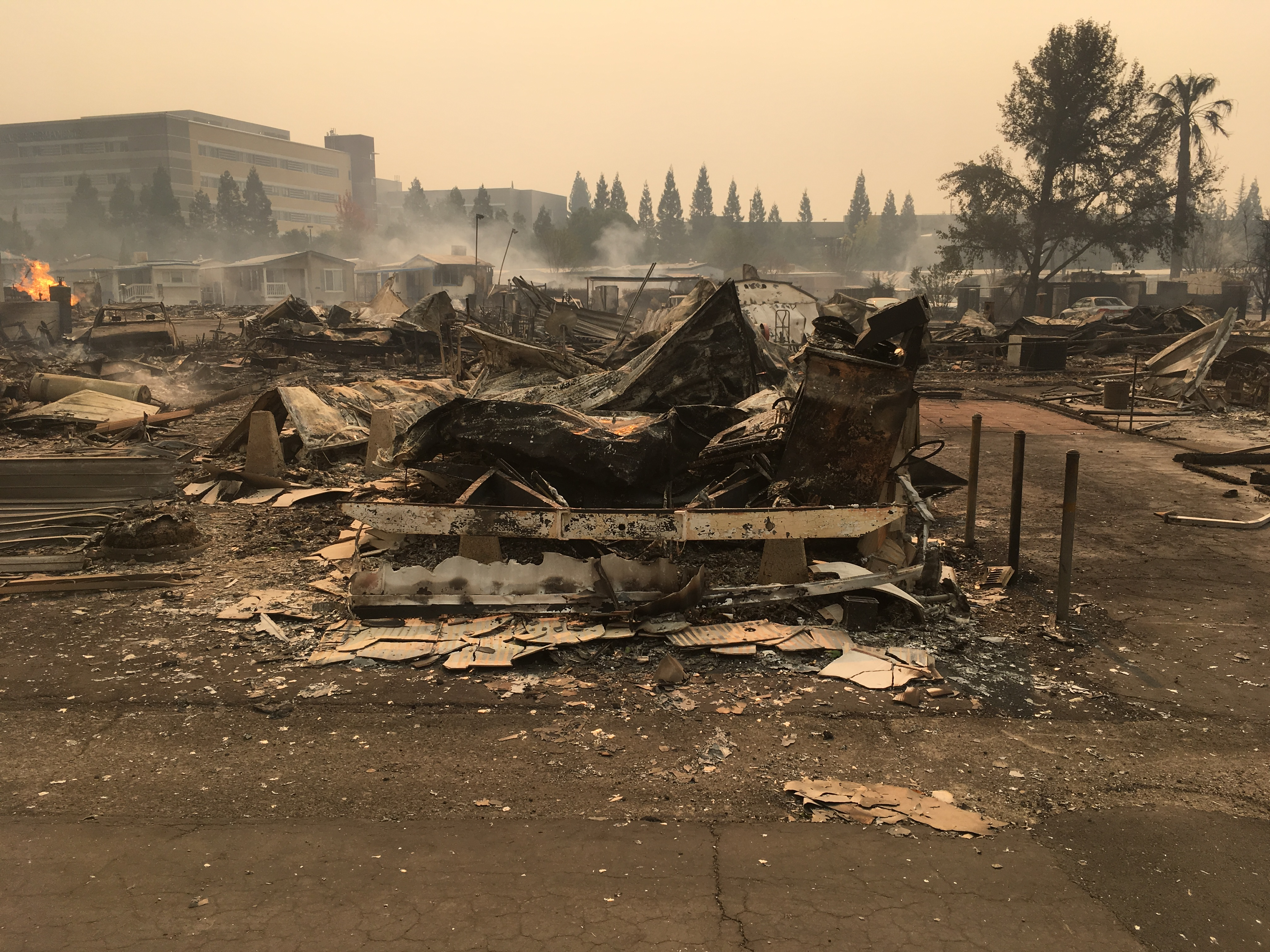
Smoldering remains of the Journey's End Mobile Home Park on October 9, 2017

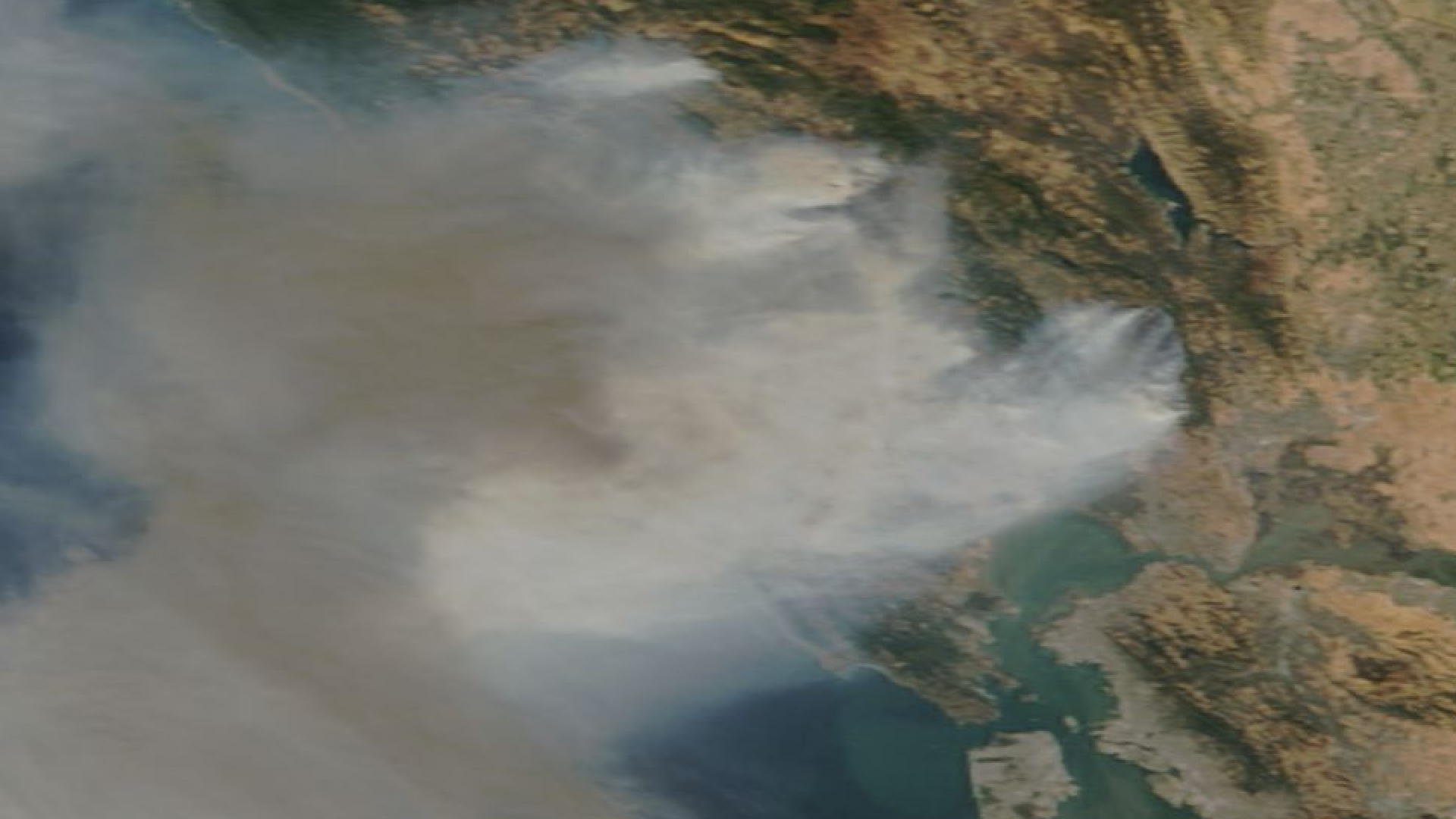
Tubbs Fire, October 9, 2017, MODIS Terra visible satellite image

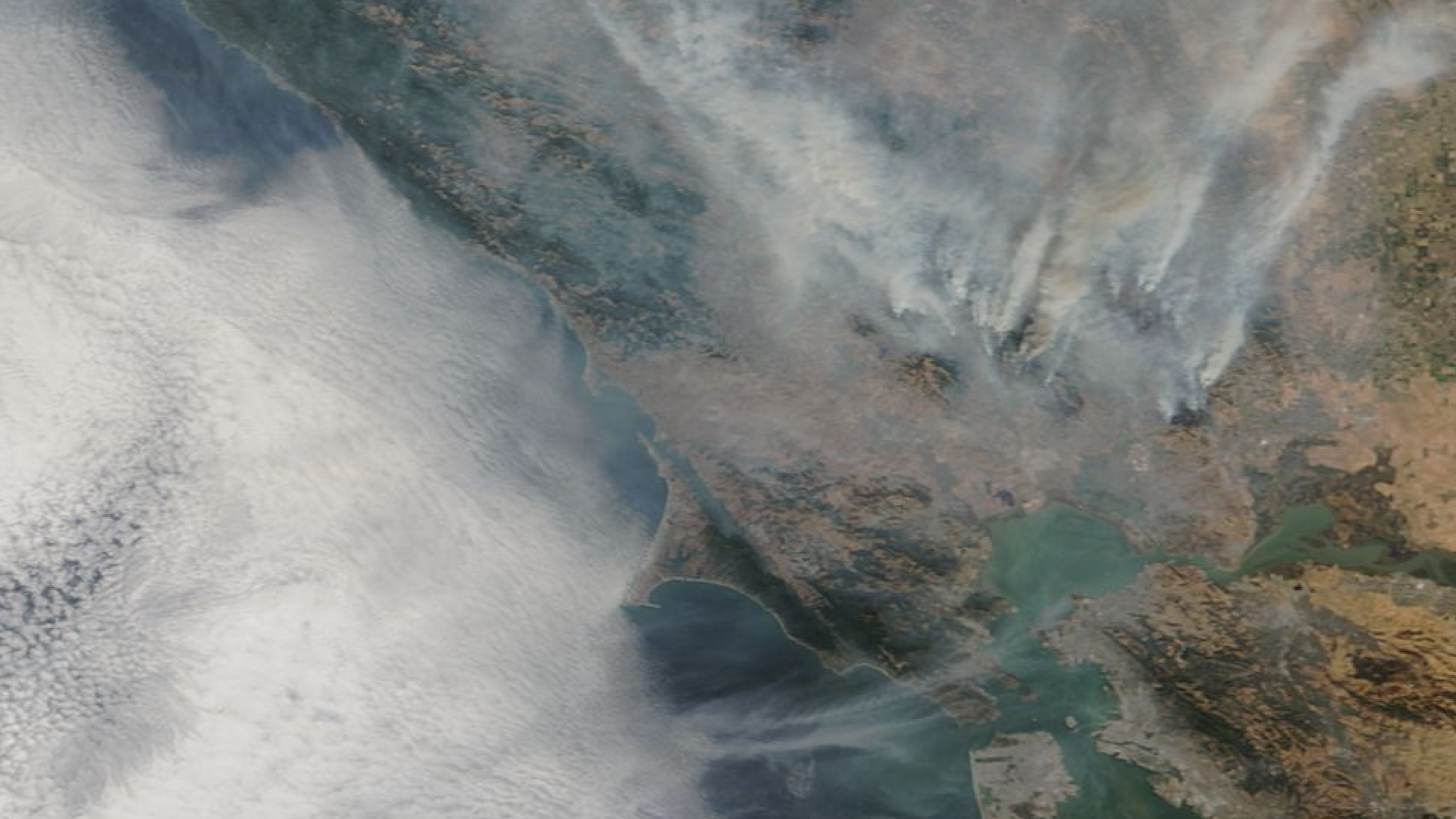
Tubbs Fire, October 10, 2017, MODIS Terra visible satellite image

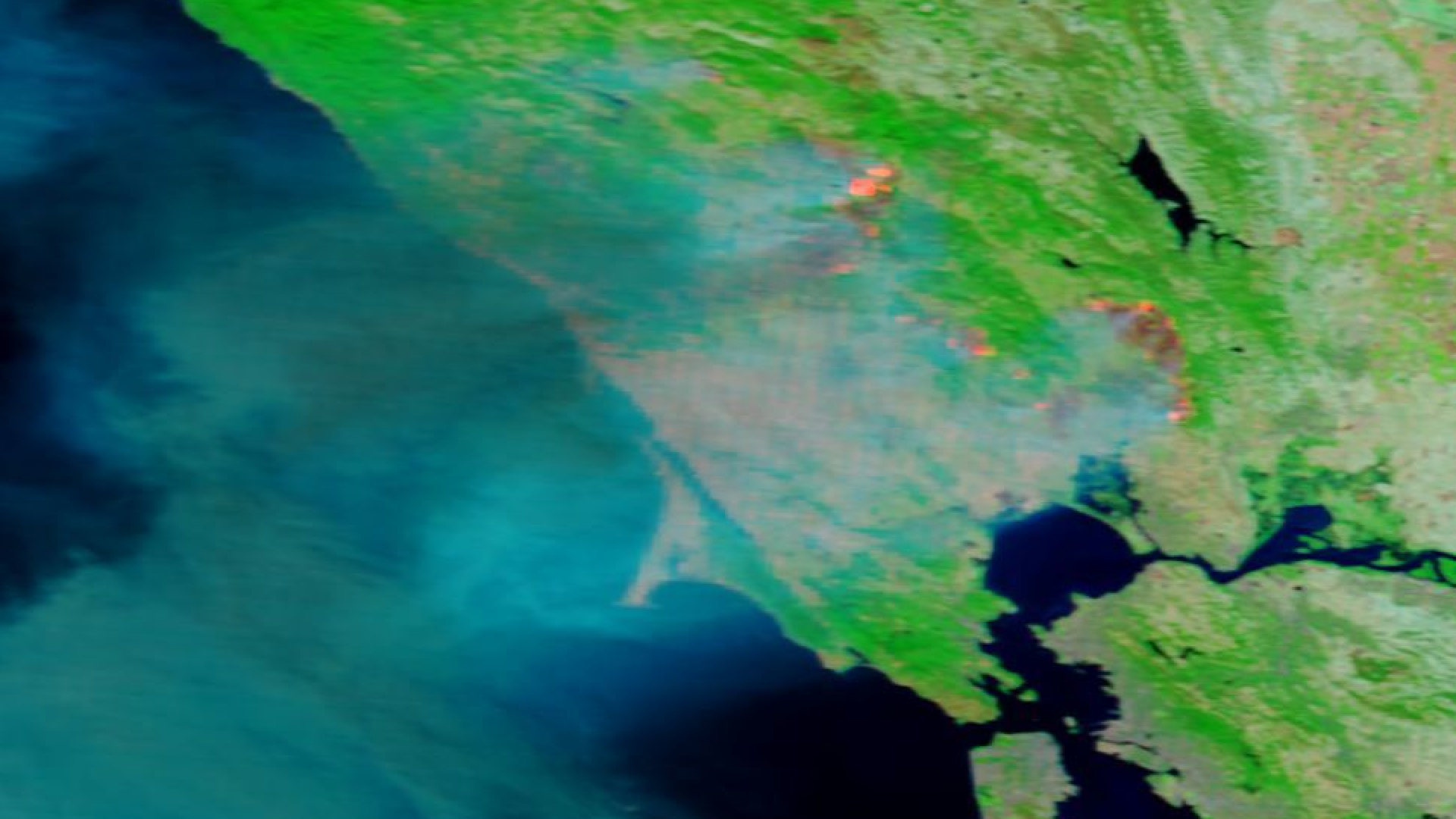
Tubbs Fire, October 10, 2017, MODIS Terra 721 satellite image

By 1 a.m. on Monday, the fire, spreading quickly to the south and west, had reached the Santa Rosa city limits. The advancing flames entered the city from the north, moving into the Fountaingrove area, then moving down ravines between Mark West Springs Road and Fountaingrove Parkway. At about 1:30 am, Sonoma County officials began to evacuate neighborhoods in and around Santa Rosa. In all, tens of thousands of people were evacuated with very little notice.

By about 2 am, the fire, carried by near hurricane-level winds, had spread further to the west, crossing Highway 101. By 4:30 am, the winds had reached their peak speed of more than 60 miles per hour.

The fire devastated the Coffey Park neighborhood, where an estimated 1,300 structures, mostly detached homes, were leveled. Meanwhile, east of the highway, the Fountaingrove Inn, the historic Fountaingrove Round Barn nearby, and a large Hilton hotel were destroyed; 116 of the 160 units at the Journey's End Mobile Home Park burned to the ground, while the remainder of the park was later red-tagged due to heavy damage. Other damage along several streets bordering Highway 101 included a Kmart store and numerous restaurants that burned to the ground.

By noon on Monday, two medical centers in Santa Rosa, Kaiser Permanente and Sutter Health, had been evacuated. Some Kaiser employees reportedly used their personal vehicles to evacuate some of the 130 patients at that hospital.

The destruction on Monday also included the complete loss of a senior living complex, Oakmont of Villa Capri; Hidden Valley Satellite, a primary school; and the Santa Rosa portion of Paradise Ridge Winery. The Cardinal Newman High School campus was badly damaged, as was one end of the Luther Burbank Center for the Performing Arts. Redwood Adventist Academy was also destroyed in the fire. Another large concentration of burned homes was in the Larkfield-Wikiup area, about a mile north of the city, where about 500 buildings were destroyed.

Of the 2,900 homes destroyed in Santa Rosa, over 200 of them belonged to doctors associated with the area's hospitals, including Kaiser Permanente, Sutter Hospital's Santa Rosa Center, and Santa Rosa Memorial Hospital. Additionally, the fire destroyed Santa Rosa Community Health's Vista Campus, the largest in its system, which served 24,000 people annually.

The Pacific Gas and Electric Company cut off natural gas to 31,000 customers in the Santa Rosa and Windsor areas as a precaution.

=== October 10 ===
Wind direction turned clockwise from northeasterly to southerly (compare MODIS satellite images). At a town hall meeting on the evening of October 10 in Santa Rosa, Cal Fire representatives reported that there could be as many as 3,000 structures lost to the Tubbs and Atlas fires.

=== October 11 ===
On Wednesday, October 11, the entire town of Calistoga was evacuated; about 2,000 people were asked to leave. The escape for some was along roads walled by flames. The Lake County Sheriff's Office issued an advisory evacuation notice for residents in the Middletown area, to the north of Calistoga.

One active part of the fire was east of the town of Windsor, with the fire burning from Shiloh ridge to Chalk Hill Road and Knights Valley.

=== October 12 ===
As of 7 a.m. on Thursday, the Tubbs Fire had burned 34,270 acres, and was 10 percent contained. In the city of Santa Rosa, officials said that the fire had destroyed an estimated 2,834 homes, along with about 400,000 square feet of commercial space.

As of Thursday morning, efforts continued to be focused on two areas:

- Near the northwest corner of Napa County, firefighters were battling the fire around Mount St. Helena, but they started pulling back before noon; the fire had hopped Highway 29, which runs adjacent to the mountain north of the evacuated town of Calistoga. There was no fire activity in the town itself, with the blaze spreading north and east of Calistoga through rugged terrain into Lake County, south of Middletown. By Thursday afternoon, only a few dozen people had refused to evacuate from Calistoga.
- In northern Sonoma County, the fire was being monitored in the area to the east of Healdsburg and Windsor. Sonoma County ordered Rio Lindo Adventist Academy, a boarding school on the outskirts of Healdsburg near the edge of the Tubbs fire, to prepare to evacuate if necessary.

Among the losses reported on Thursday was the destruction of the Santa Rosa hillside home of late Peanuts creator Charles Schulz; his widow, Jean Schulz, escaped unhurt. By Thursday evening, 28,000 customers in the Santa Rosa and Windsor areas still had not had their gas service restored.

=== October 13–31 ===
On Friday morning, October 13, the fire was 25 percent contained. It remained about two miles outside of Calistoga's city limits.

A fire erupted in the hills east of Oakmont late Friday night, prompting the mandatory evacuation of neighborhoods early Saturday morning from Calistoga Road to Adobe Canyon Road, along Highway 12. The zone included several schools and the Oakmont Village retirement neighborhood. Evacuations for the area were lifted by late the following Wednesday.

By Saturday morning, October 14, the fire was 44 percent contained. A "small army of firefighters and police" was positioned between where the fire was most active, north of Calistoga, and the city itself.

In the Fountaingrove area of Santa Rosa, firefighters and utility crews combed through the ruins left by the fire. Fire officials searched for dangerous hot spots that could re-ignite the blaze, and utility workers began cleaning up the demolished neighborhoods. Historical archives of Hewlett-Packard (consisting of over 100 boxes of documents from William Hewlett and David Packard, who had founded the company in Silicon Valley in 1938) were completely lost when two buildings on the Fountaingrove headquarters campus of Keysight Technologies were incinerated. A former HP employee who had previously been in charge of the archives commented that "a huge piece of American business history is gone", and Keysight disputed criticism that the archives (which it had acquired at the time of its founding as a HP spin-off in 2014) had been inadequately protected.

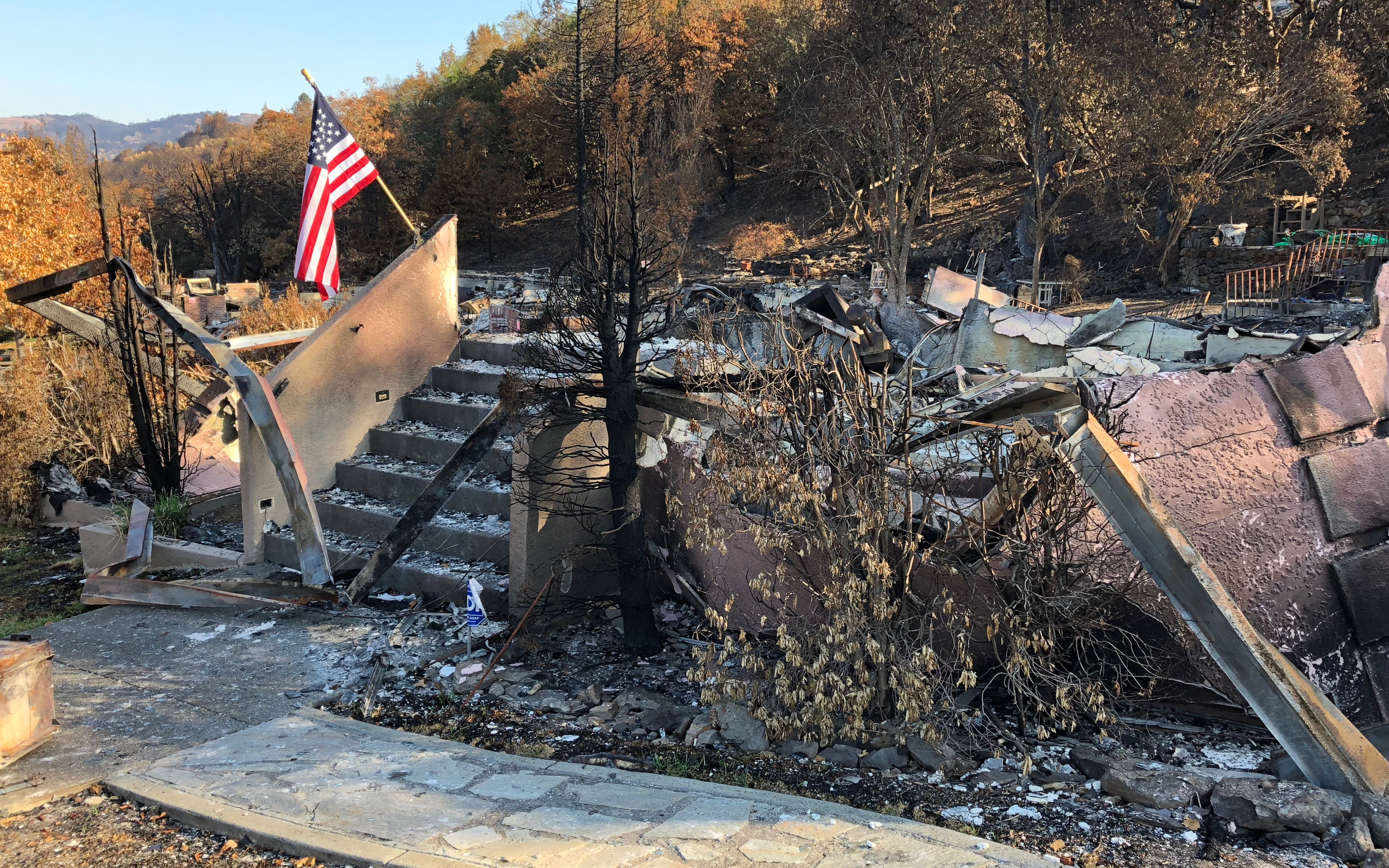
Remains of a house on Cross Creek Road in Fountaingrove on November 1, 2017

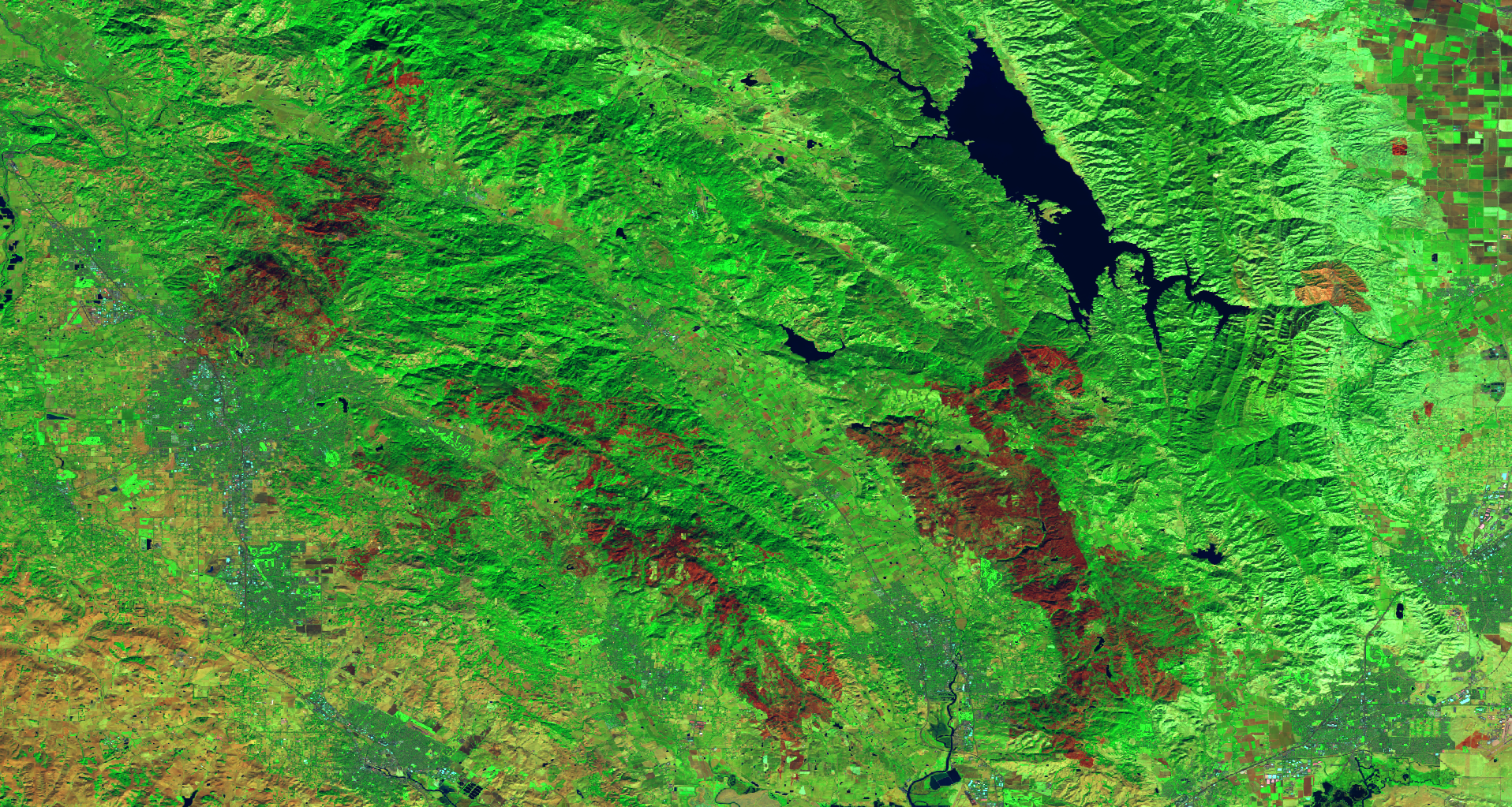
November 11, 2017, Landsat 8 OLI, bands 753, Napa, Sonoma fires of October 2017

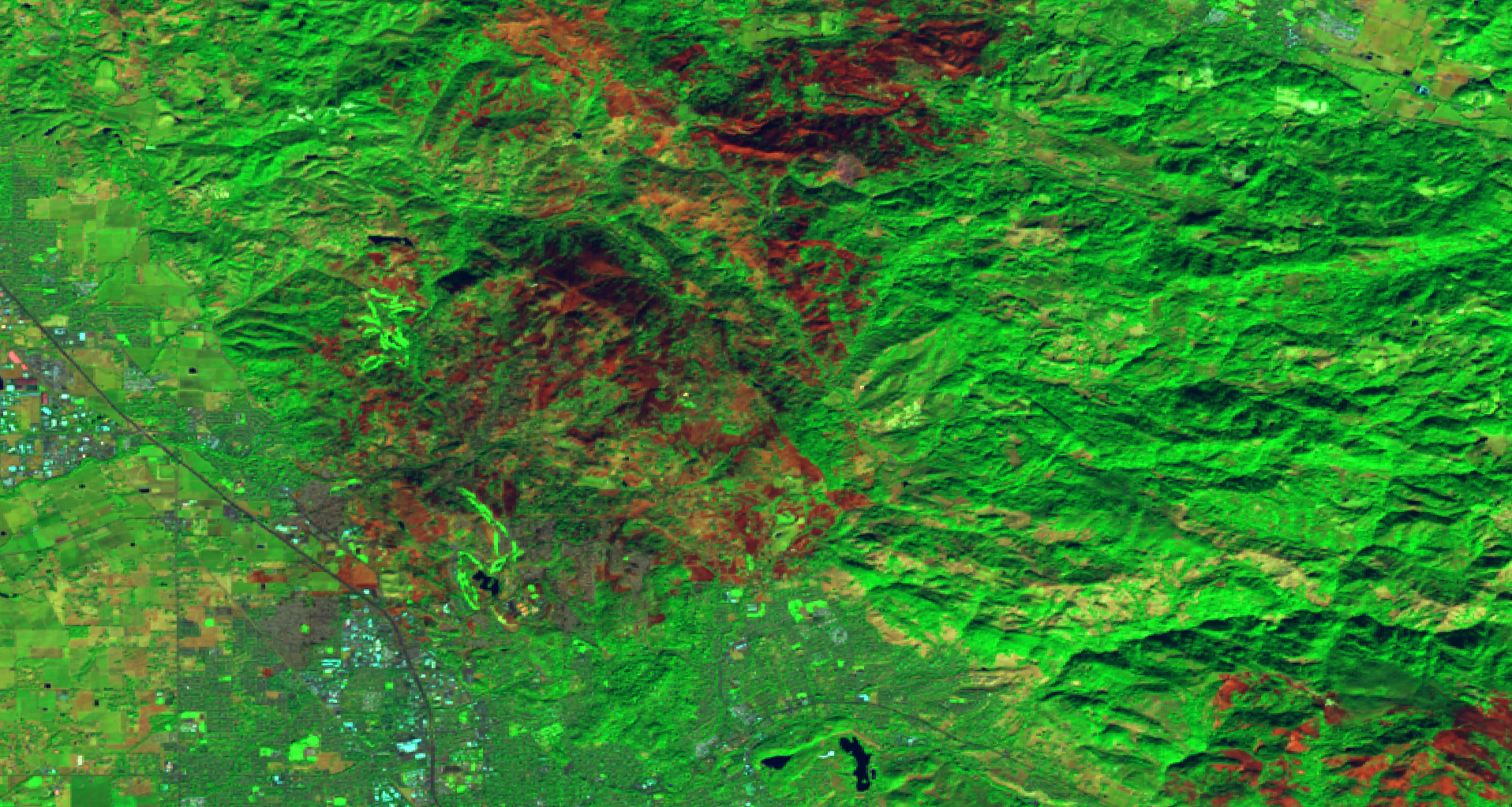
November 11, 2017, Landsat 8 OLI, bands 753, false color infra-red satellite image, zoom to full resolution on Santa Rosa, California. Scale: 1:24,000.

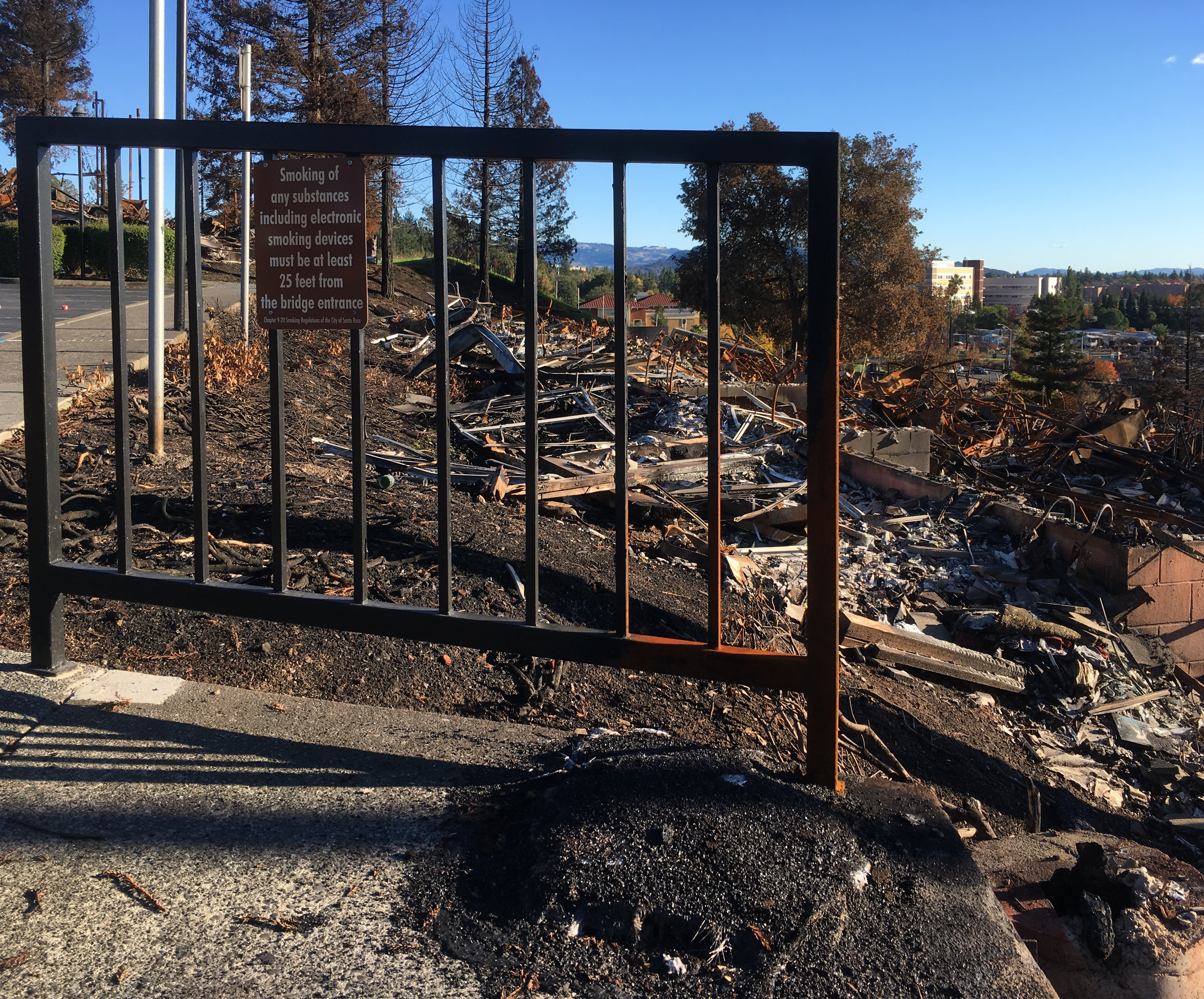
Staircase leading to the west wing buildings of the Hilton Sonoma Wine Country Hotel on November 17, 2017

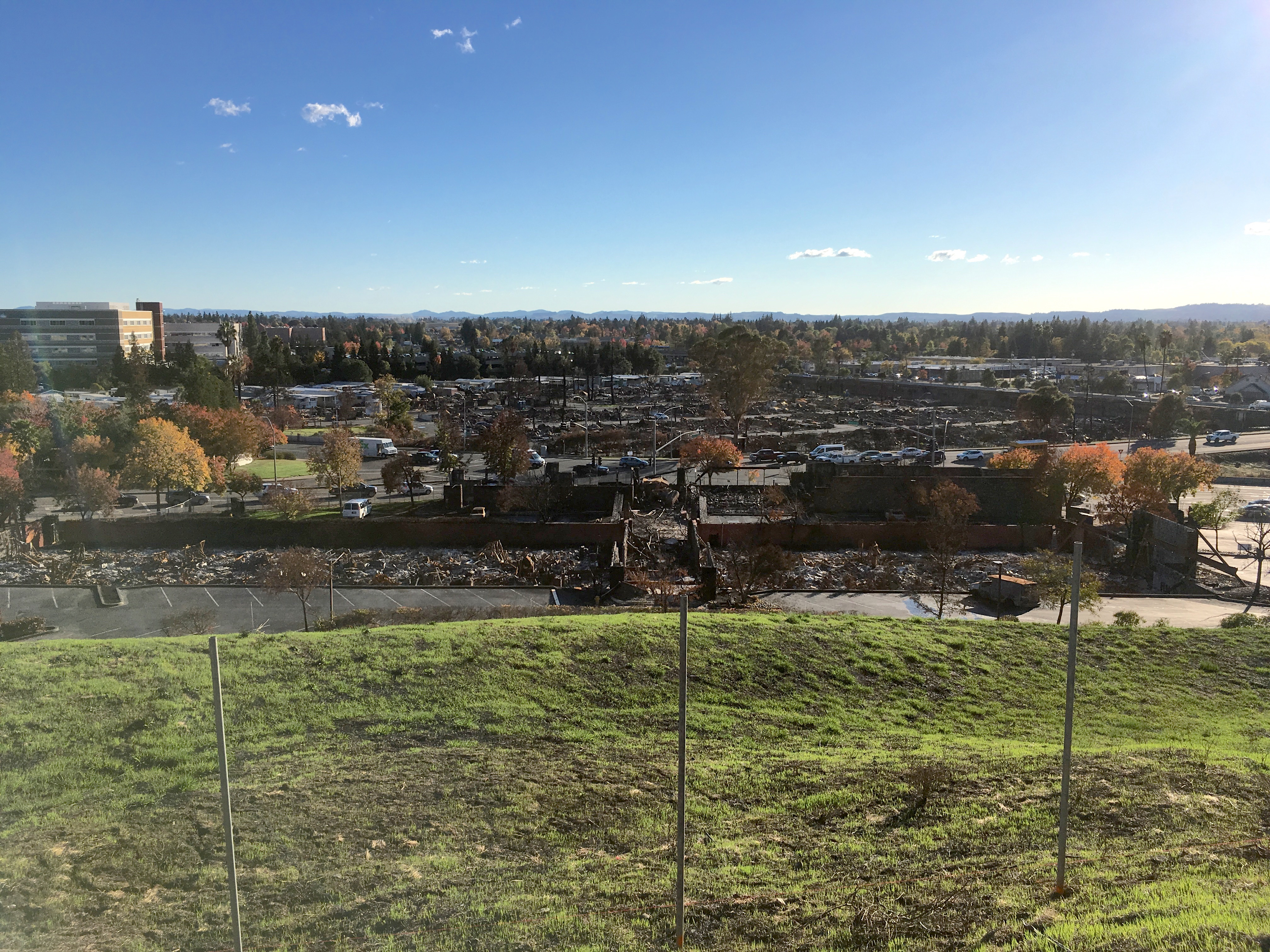
Overlook view of the damage to the Fountaingrove Inn (foreground) and Journey's End on November 17, 2017

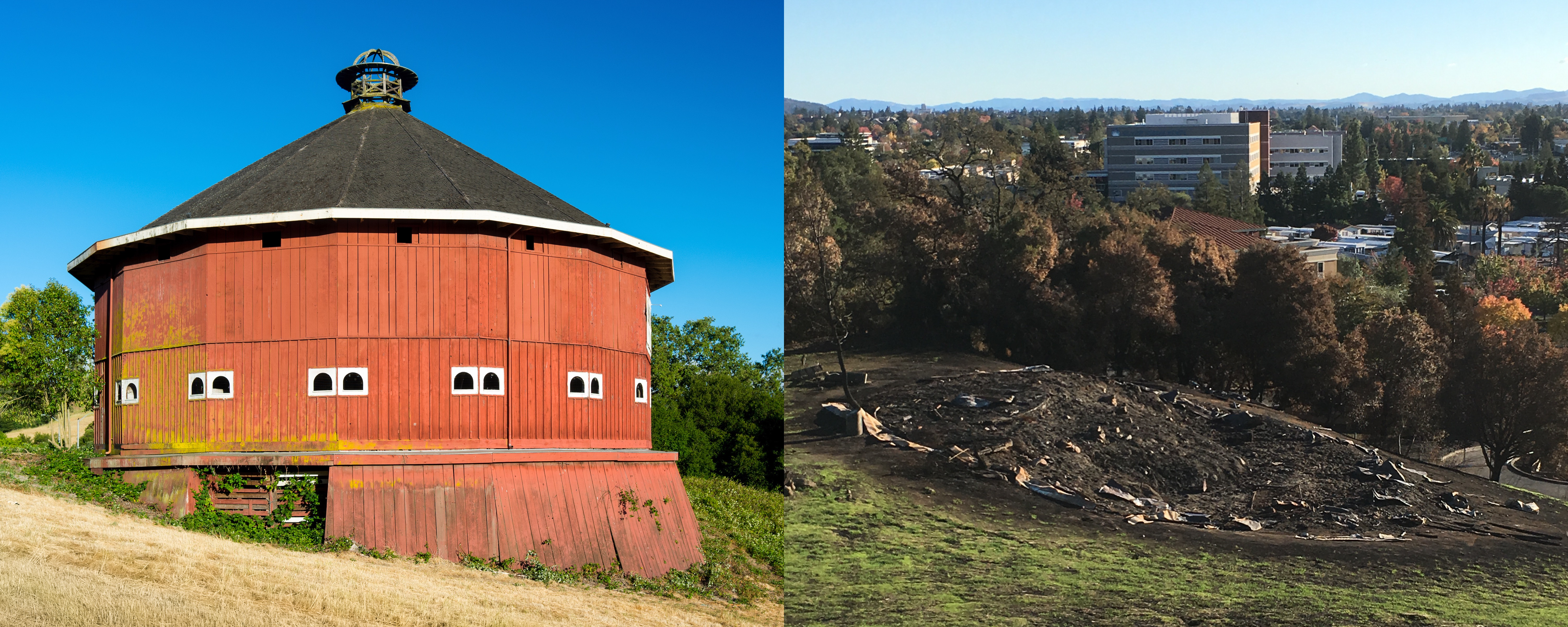
The historic Fountaingrove Round Barn before and after the fire on November 17, 2017

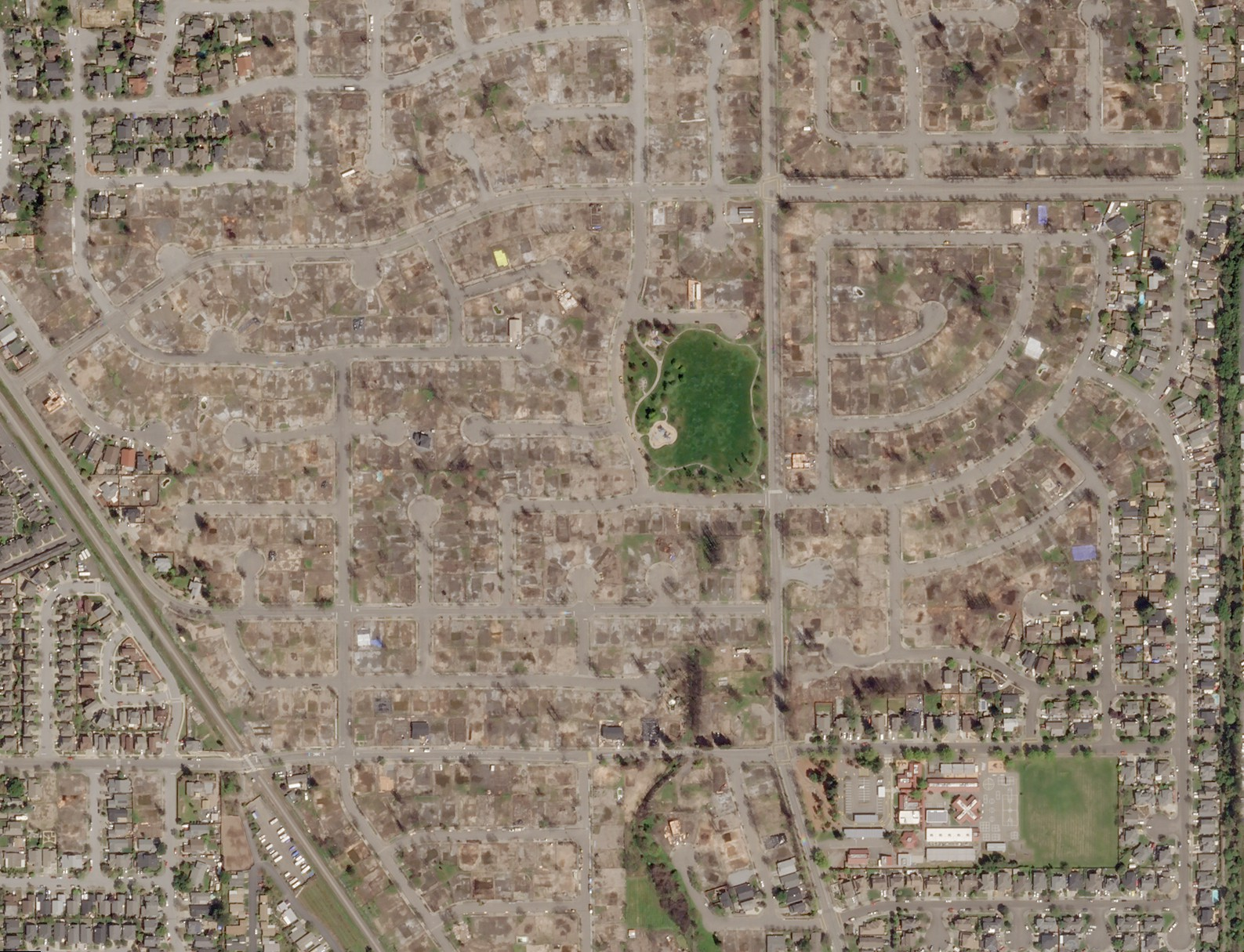
SkySat satellite image of the aftermath of the Tubbs Fire in the Coffey Park neighborhood of Santa Rosa, California, March 4, 2018.

== Containment progress ==
Fire containment status
| Date | Acres burned | Containment |
|---|---|---|
| Oct 9 | 25,000 | |
| Oct 10 | 27,000 | |
| Oct 11 | 27,363 | |
| Oct 12 | 34,770 | |
| Oct 13 | 35,270 | |
| Oct 14 | 35,470 | |
| Oct 15 | 35,470 | |
| Oct 16 | 36,432 | |
| Oct 17 | 36,432 | |
| Oct 18 | 36,432 | |
| Oct 19 | 36,432 | |
| Oct 20 | 36,432 | |
| Oct 21 | 36,793 | |
| Oct 22–25 | 36,807 | |
| Oct 26 | 36,807 | |
| --- | --- | --- |
| Oct 31 | 36,807 | |

== Comparison to the Hanly Fire ==
In 1964, the Hanly Fire, the third largest fire in Sonoma County history, burned 52,700 acres, with striking similarities to the Tubbs Fire. The damage caused by the two fires differed dramatically, however: since 1964, hundreds of expensive homes, a golf course and clubhouse restaurant, office and medical buildings, light industry, lakeside retirement homes, a long row of nursing facilities, and two hotels were built in the Fountaingrove area, which had been almost entirely open land in 1964.

The path the Hanly Fire took in 1964 began in Calistoga, then along Porter Creek and Mark West Springs roads into Sonoma County, burning homes along Mark West Springs and Riebli roads, through Wikiup, and to Mendocino Avenue, where it stopped, across the street from Journey's End Mobile Home Park. The fire was propelled by 70 mph winds, close to hurricane strength; it initially went east from Calistoga, but on the third day its direction switched, going south-west from Calistoga to Santa Rosa in only about half a day. The Hanly Fire only destroyed a few dozen homes, as the area it burned was so sparsely settled in 1964.

Sonoma County has four "historic wildfire corridors," including the Hanly Fire area. New homes in the fire zones are required to meet building code requirements for fire-resistant materials for siding, roofing and decks, with protected eaves to keep out windblown embers. Those measures made little difference in the Tubbs Fire. For example, despite a 100-foot fire break that ringed much of the Fountaingrove II subdivision, which consisted of 600 upscale homes in the same path as the Hanly Fire, virtually the entire subdivision was destroyed by the Tubbs Fire.

== News and social media coverage ==
The fire was covered extensively and in depth by news outlets from around the San Francisco Bay Area and beyond. (Note: Several local outlets received national recognition for their broadcasts. KXTV (Continuing Coverage) and KNTV (Hard News, News Documentary) won Edward R. Murrow Awards, while KPIX won the National Headliner Award and the Sigma Delta Chi Award (both for Breaking News coverage).) In addition to local coverage, CNN and Fox News were on scene in Sonoma County, focusing primarily on northern Santa Rosa. The majority of communication regarding the fire came from social media websites such as Twitter, Facebook, Snapchat and Nixle.

From October 9 through 13, Snapchat ran a geolocation tagging filter to isolate material about the fire, and these posts were featured on the Discover page. By October 11, over 12,000 videos and images had been uploaded to Snapchat. Donald Laird, an instructor at Santa Rosa Junior College, and Richard Dunn, a local photographer, submitted featured posts.

Twitter analytics revealed that the majority of tweets about the Tubbs Fire were posted on October 11.

The Press Democrat staff also won the 2018 Pulitzer Prize for Breaking News Reporting for "lucid and tenacious coverage of historic wildfires that ravaged the city of Santa Rosa and Sonoma County".

== Cause of the fire and victim claims against PG&E ==
Suspicion for the cause of the fire fell on energy company Pacific Gas and Electric Company (PG&E), but the company seemed to be cleared of responsibility in this incident after Cal Fire released the results of its investigation on January 24, 2019, upon which news the company's stock price jumped dramatically. However, some private experts disagreed and thought PG&E lines arcing might still have been the cause.

On August 14, 2019, U.S. Bankruptcy Judge Dennis Montali, the federal judge for the PG&E bankruptcy proceedings, presided over a hearing for victims of the Tubbs Fire, and they presented their case for a fast-track state civil trial by jury to resolve if PG&E were at fault for the Tubbs Fire, rather than customer equipment causing the fire as determined by Cal Fire. The judge's ruling on this trial had important ramifications for how Tubbs Fire victims were to be compensated and the schedule for the bankruptcy. On August 16, 2019, the judge ruled that the trial can proceed "on a parallel track" because "it advances the goals of this bankruptcy." By November 2019, this trial was scheduled to begin January 7, 2020 in San Francisco. PG&E needed to get its bankruptcy plan approved by June 30, 2020 to be included in the fund for fire costs created by the new state law AB 1054. After the judge's ruling, the company's stock price sank by 25%.

On December 6, 2019, in an effort to avert the trial, PG&E proposed to settle the wildfire victim claims for a total of $13.5 billion, which would cover liability for its responsibility originating from the Camp Fire, Butte Fire, and also a series of wildfires beginning on October 8, 2017, collectively called the 2017 North Bay Fires. (The Tubbs Fire is considered to be one of the 2017 North Bay Fires.) The offer was tendered as part of PG&E's plan to exit bankruptcy. The court case was superseded by the PG&E Restructuring Support Agreement (RSA) of December 9, 2019 and by the bankruptcy reorganization plan, wherein PG&E agreed to settle claims from the Tubbs Fire. On July 1, 2020, the PG&E Fire Victim Trust (FVT) was established as part of the reorganization plan of the 2019 bankruptcy of PG&E to administer the claims of the wildfire victims. Also on July 1, PG&E funded the Fire Victim Trust (FVT) with $5.4 billion in cash and 22.19% of stock in the reorganized PG&E, which covers most of the obligations of its settlement for the wildfire victims. As of June 2020, PG&E had two more payments totaling $1.35 billion in cash scheduled to be paid in January 2021 and January 2022, to complete its obligations to the wildfire victims.

In October 2020, on the third anniversary of the Tubbs Fire, the San Francisco Chronicle reported that as part of a separate $1 billion settlement with local governments, Sonoma County had received almost $150 million from PG&E and the city of Santa Rosa city had received $95 million, with officials "facing tough decisions about how to spend all the money." By that time, around 2,100 homes had been rebuilt, with more in progress.

== See also ==
- 2017 California wildfires
- Atlas Fire
- Cedar Fire (2003)
- Joe Rodota Trail homeless encampment following the Tubbs Fire
- List of California wildfires
- Thomas Fire
- Witch Fire
