= Bay of Bengal Cooperative Air Traffic Flow Management System =

The Bay of Bengal Cooperative Air Traffic Flow Management System (BOBCAT) is the air traffic flow management (ATFM) of Asia. The CFMU (Central Flow Management Unit) was launched in 2007 by the International Civil Aviation Organization (ICAO) and Aeronautical Radio of Thailand, Ltd (AEROTHAI).

BOBCAT is a secure web-based air traffic flow management (ATFM) system for westbound aircraft operating from South and Southeast Asia to Europe during the busy night time period. These aircraft transit Afghanistan airspace, which is limited in capacity in supporting air traffic. It allocates entry slots into the Kabul FIR and advises the aircraft while still at its flight departure point. BOBCAT also includes an in-house ATFM Information Support System to better monitor regional load.
