= Air Traffic Control System Command Center =

Air Traffic Control center in Virginia

Coordinates: 38°44′50″N 77°40′15″W

The Air Traffic Control System Command Center (ATCSCC) is a real-time command, control, and oversight unit of the Federal Aviation Administration (FAA) air traffic control system, located at Vint Hill Farms Station, near Warrenton, Virginia.

It "monitors and manages the flow of air traffic throughout the National Airspace System" in conjunction with the Air Route Traffic Control Centers ("Centers"), designated terminal radar approach control facilities(TRACONs), and some of the busiest individual air traffic control towers. It uses various traffic management initiatives to manage air traffic flow, including reroutes, ground delay programs and ground stops.

ATCSCC was established at FAA headquarters on July 29, 1970, relocated to a larger space in Herndon, Virginia in 1994, and moved to an even larger space at its current location in March 2011, on a site shared with the Potomac Consolidated TRACON.
