= Napa Soda Springs, California =

Unincorporated community in California, United States

Napa Soda Springs
- privately owned property
- Location in California Napa Soda Springs (the United States)
- Coordinates: 38°23′27″N 122°16′46″W
- Country: United States
- State: California
- County: Napa
- Elevation: 705 ft (215 m)

Napa Soda Springs (formerly Jacksons Napa Soda Springs) is a set of natural water springs that was the site of a resort in the 1880s in Napa County, California, United States. It lies at an elevation of 705 feet (215 m). Napa Soda Springs is located 5 miles (8.0 km) east-southeast of Yountville.

The Napa Soda Springs post office operated from 1882 to 1929.
