= Ground delay program =

Traffic flow initiative for aviation in the United States

An air traffic control ground delay program (GDP), previously described as part of FAA Flow Control, is a National Airspace System traffic management initiative to delay aircraft at departure airports in order to reconcile demand with capacity at arrival airports. It is instituted by the United States Federal Aviation Administration (FAA) and administered by the Air Traffic Control System Command Center.

By contrast, a ground stop overrides all other traffic management initiatives and requires affected aircraft to remain on the ground, despite any original or delayed departure time.

A ground delay program might be associated with the following at a destination airport:

- inclement weather (e.g., reduced visibility, thunderstorms, snow)
- a large volume of incoming aircraft exceeding airport capacity
- a large volume of aircraft en route to another airport in the same line of flight

A key metric for assessing whether a ground delay program is needed is the airport arrival rate (AAR), which specifies arrival capacity, more specifically the number of arriving aircraft that an airport and its terminal airspace can accept under specific conditions throughout any consecutive 60-minute period. Those specific conditions include:

- operational factors that lower airport capacity, e.g., runway conditions, equipment outages
- weather conditions that requires increased spacing between aircraft, such as weather worse than visual meteorological conditions (VMC), whether marginal VMC (does not allow visual vectoring, but permits visual separation on final), instrument meteorological conditions (IMC), or low IMC.

Optimal AARs are set by the Deputy Director of System Operations (DDSO) together with terminal facility managers. When receiving traffic flow information suggesting significant delays, the Air Traffic Control System Command Center (ATCSCC), in Warrenton, Virginia (Vint Hill Farms Station) must confer with affected facilities to determine revised AARs, review system demand and other factors, and decide whether a ground delay program is appropriate.

Ground delay programs can affect airports in the contiguous United States, as well as select airports in Canada. That is because Nav Canada inherited the agreement between the FAA and Transport Canada that ground delay programs would be implemented for departures from Canadian airports. GDPs are always assigned a "scope", which can be based on distance (e.g., all departures bound for an affected airport that are less than 1,500 miles away), a specific air route traffic control center (ARTCC, known as a "center"), or a wider geographic "tier" region surrounding the territory of a specific center.

Atlanta Center (FAA identifier ZTL) in green, together with five first-tier ARTCCs in yellow, and eight second-tier ARTCCs in blue. Source: see this interactive FAA map, which can generate a tier map for any center, e.g., New York, Chicago, Los Angeles.

Tiers are wider geographic areas based on the boundaries of multiple area control centers. Tier 1 refers to centers immediately adjacent to the boundaries of a specific center area. Tier 2 brings in additional centers adjacent to tier 1 center boundaries. For instance, if Atlanta were affected by a ground delay program, air traffic control could institute delays for just ZTL (Atlanta Center) or also for each of the tier 1 centers touching ZTL. Or, the delay might also include tier 2 centers, that is, centers touching tier 1 boundaries. It is also possible to impose a tier 3 ground delay on incoming flights from all airports, regardless of origin.

These programs often last for a sustained period, perhaps several hours, while average delays can vary as conditions change at the destination airport or in the relevant airspace.

Each aircraft preparing for departure under a GDP is assigned an Expect Departure Clearance Time (EDCT). This is the expected runway release time (also known as "wheels up time" or "wheels off") for takeoff. There are various ways that the FAA assigns delays, but a preferred method is a Unified Ground Delay Program (UDP). Traffic management personnel and aircraft operators use traffic flow decision support systems such as the Traffic Flow Management System (TFMS). That system's Flight Schedule Monitor (FSM) software supports assessments of demand and capacity for constrained airports or airspace and facilitates collaborative decision-making. The FSM software assigns arrival slots to aircraft, delays flights to fit capacity, and calculates EDCTs based on the arrival slot and estimated en-route time of each flight. Traffic management personnel evaluate the projected flow of traffic into airports and sectors, then implement the least restrictive action necessary to ensure that traffic demand does not exceed system capacity. Aircraft must depart within five minutes before or after their EDCT, or else they require a new EDCT and may experience further delays.

When conditions improve, or when demand decreases due to delays or cancellations elsewhere, the ATCSCC may begin running compressions. That is, when airlines revise or cancel flight plans, they free up existing slots for use by flights that would otherwise be delayed. Such changes allow additional EDCTs to be revised, further decreasing delays.

It is to the flight planner's advantage to file a plan as early as possible to minimize the chance that a ground delay program is issued before the flight plan is filed. Flight plans filed after a GDP (known as "pop-ups") are not included in known demand when the GDP is issued and are therefore more likely to experience increased delays.

Ground delay and ground stop are not the only available traffic management initiatives. Similar to a ground delay program is an airspace flow program, which assigns planned delays on the ground in response to predicted en route demand in a volume of airspace instead of predicted arrival demand at an airport.
