= List of watershed topics =

Watershed terms and topics

This list embraces topographical watersheds and drainage basins and other topics focused on them.

== Terms – different uses ==
- The source of a river or stream is the furthest place from its estuary or confluence with another river, and is alternatively known as a "watershed" and/or "headwaters" in some countries.
- The confluence is the meeting of two rivers or streams, and may sometimes be known as "headwaters".
- A drainage basin is an area of land where all surface water converges to a single point at a lower elevation. In North America, "watershed" is used for this sense, while elsewhere terms like "catchment" or "drainage area" are used.
- A drainage divide is the line that separates neighboring drainage basins. In English-speaking countries outside of North America, this is normally known as a "watershed".

== Drainage divides ==
- Drainage divides category
- The European Watershed, the line dividing the drainage basins of the major rivers of Europe
- The Drainage divides, the lines dividing drainage basins in North America (i.e.: Great Basin Divide and Great Basin hydrologic region)

== Watersheds and drainage basins ==
- Basins category
- Drainage basins category
- List of drainage basins by area: A worldwide list of watersheds
- Drainage basins of the Atlantic Ocean category
- Drainage basins of the Arctic Ocean category

=== Watersheds - basins by country ===
- Watersheds of Canada category
- Watersheds of the United States category
- Drainage systems of Australia category

==== Examples ====
- Lake Erie Watershed (Pennsylvania)
- Guadalupe Watershed
- Hudson River Watershed
- Humber Watershed
- Turtle Creek Watershed

== Watershed and drainage basin organisations and institutions ==
=== Management organisations ===
- Watershed management, the management of drainage basins
- Watershed Protection and Flood Prevention Act, a United States law controlling drainage and water storage
- Watershed district (Minnesota), one of a number of government entities in the US state of Minnesota which monitor and regulate the use of water in drainage basins
- Watershed district (Russia), one of twenty groups of water bodies listed in the Water Code of the Russian Federation

==== Examples ====
- Council for Watershed Health
- Great Swamp Watershed Association
- Minnehaha Creek Watershed District
- Santa Fe Watershed Association
- Walla Walla Basin Watershed Council
- Yukon River Inter-Tribal Watershed Council

=== Study institutions ===
- University of South Carolina Upstate: Center for Watershed Ecology

== Other uses ==
- Watershed College, Zimbabwe
- Watershed Media Centre, Bristol, England
- Stony Brook Millstone Watershed Arboretum
- "River of Words"; watersheds as subject poetry competition
