= East Fork Road =

Road in California, United States

Coordinates: 34°14′3″N 117°48′5″W

East Fork Road, located in the San Gabriel Mountains above the city of Azusa, California, is a road that gives access from State Route 39 into East Fork and other small townships, including Camp Williams and Julius Klein Conservation Fire Camp 19, a minor offender prisoner housing complex where "LACO fire personnel provide training, which prepares inmates to safely conduct wild land firefighting operations."

The road begins at Route 39, passing over the San Gabriel River, and follows the east fork of the river, crossing a number of small streams. The terminus is Heaton Flats, which has a campsite, a toilet facility, and trails that lead upstream and to the summit of Iron Mountain, 8,007 feet (2,441 m) above.

Along East Fork Road there are extensive fire-fighting facilities which are staged to combat the many fires that break out among the foothills above Azusa, Glendora, and San Dimas every year. The road is located within the Angeles National Forest and is managed by the United States Forest Service.

The United States Forest Service states that all mining operations, including gold panning, are illegal along the East Fork; Additionally, since the area's designation as a National Monument in 2014, all resource extraction is prohibited (as is the case on all National Monuments).

Some of the sites of the area's mining heritage can be accessed from the road by visiting the site of "Eldoradoville", a mining town with three stores and six saloons that was established in 1859 and washed away in the flood of January 18, 1862. Shoemaker Canyon is named for gold miner Alonzo Shoemaker, who prospected the canyon in the 1870s and 1880s.

East Fork Road was initially planned as an outlet from the Los Angeles area to State Route 2 and includes a "Bridge to Nowhere" that was abandoned after a flood; a later plan included two never-used tunnels on the aborted Shoemaker Canyon Road. The bridge was built in the 1930s but associated road infrastructure was demolished by the 1938 flood. Prisoners from Detention Camp 14 began working on another road in 1954, and it was thus known to locals as Convict Road. The so-called Shoemaker Tunnels date from this era. Funding for the unfinished project was cut in 1969.

In January 2005, a flood washed out two bridges, which stranded 200 campers and residents for days.

== Road remains ==
Parts of the old destroyed sections of the East Fork roadway can still be found as one hikes from Heaton Flats and heads generally East along the riverbed. Sections of destroyed bridge supports give hikers clues as to where the roadway used to be located; however, extensive sections of the asphalt-covered road still exist and lead up to Laurel Gulch and the John Seals Bridge, which is located just before one enters the Sheep Mountain Wilderness.

Once inside the designated wilderness the above-ground and still-visible sections of the old destroyed length of the East Fork Road become fewer and fewer until eventually there are no more sections to be found.

== See also ==
- Arizona State Route 76 - Another highway abandoned mid-construction and left incomplete.
