= San Gabriel River (California) =

River in Los Angeles County, California, United States

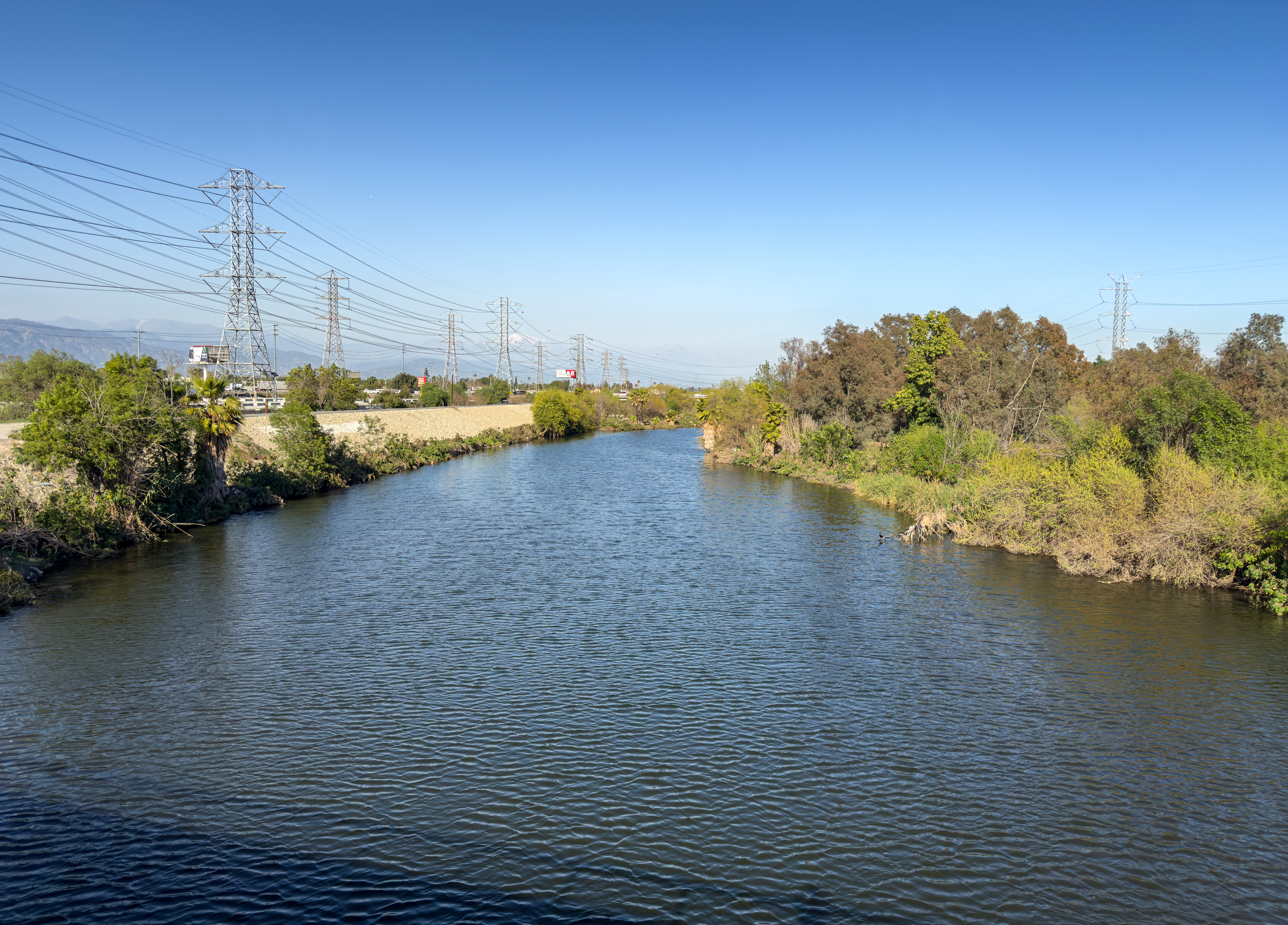
- San Gabriel River from Peck Road Bridge between South El Monte and Industry, California

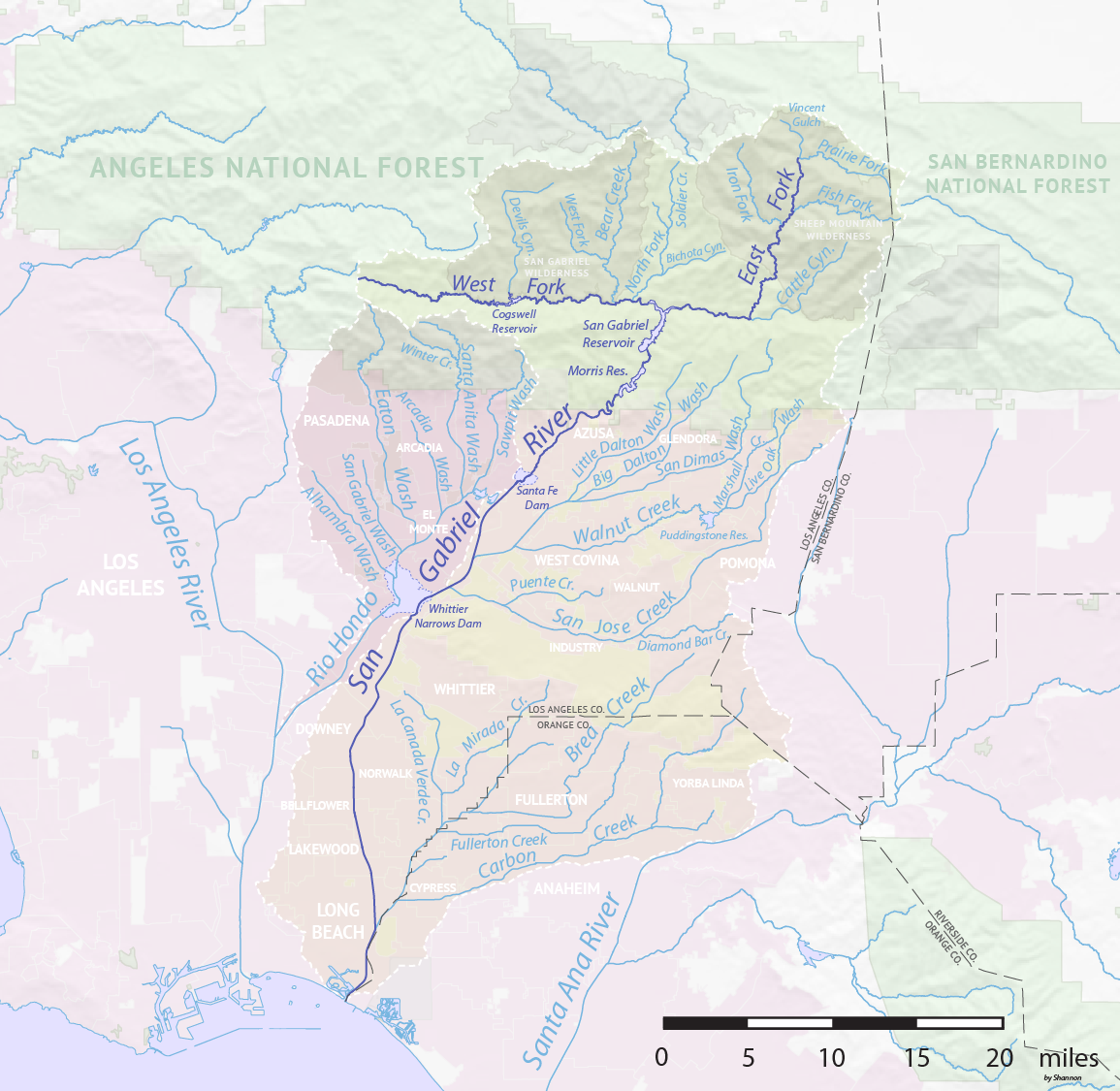
- Map of the San Gabriel (yellow) and Rio Hondo (purple) watersheds.

Location
- Country: United States
- State: California
- Counties: Los Angeles County, Orange County

Physical characteristics
- Source: East Fork San Gabriel River
  - location: Angeles National Forest, San Gabriel Mountains
  - coordinates: 34°20′35″N 117°43′30″W
  - elevation: 4,493 ft (1,369 m)
- Mouth: Pacific Ocean
  - location: Alamitos Bay, Long Beach/Seal Beach
  - coordinates: 33°44′33″N 118°06′56″W
  - elevation: 0 ft (0 m)
- Length: 58 mi (93 km)
- Basin size: 689 sq mi (1,780 km^{2})
- Discharge
  - location: above Whittier Narrows Dam
  - average: 185 cu ft/s (5.2 m^{3}/s)
  - minimum: 0 cu ft/s (0 m^{3}/s)
  - maximum: 46,600 cu ft/s (1,320 m^{3}/s)

Basin features
- Tributaries
  - left: Walnut Creek, San Jose Creek, Coyote Creek
  - right: West Fork San Gabriel River

The San Gabriel River is a mostly-urban waterway flowing 58 miles (93 km) southward through Los Angeles and Orange Counties, California, in the United States. It is the central of three major rivers draining the Greater Los Angeles area, the others being the Los Angeles River and Santa Ana River. The river's watershed stretches from the rugged San Gabriel Mountains to the heavily developed San Gabriel Valley and a significant part of the Los Angeles coastal plain, emptying into the Pacific Ocean between the cities of Long Beach and Seal Beach.

The San Gabriel once ran across a vast alluvial flood plain, its channels shifting with winter floods and forming extensive wetlands along its perennial course, a relatively scarce source of fresh water in this arid region. The Tongva and their ancestors inhabited the San Gabriel River basin for thousands of years at villages like Puvunga, relying on the abundant fish and game in riparian habitats. The river is named for the nearby Mission San Gabriel Arcángel, established in 1771 during the Spanish colonization of California. Its water was heavily used for irrigation and ranching by Spanish, Mexican, and American settlers before urbanization began in the early 1900s, eventually transforming much of the watershed into industrial and suburban areas of greater Los Angeles.

Severe floods in 1914, 1934, and 1938 spurred Los Angeles County, and later the federal government, to build a system of dams and debris basins and to channelize much of the lower San Gabriel River with riprap or concrete banks. There is also an extensive system of spreading grounds and other works to capture stormwater runoff and conserve it for urban use. Approximately one-third of the water used in southeast Los Angeles County today comes from the river.

The upper San Gabriel has been intermittently mined for gold since the 1860s, and its deep gravel bed has been an important source of construction aggregate since the early 1900s. The river is also a popular recreation area, with parks and trails in the many flood basins along its course. The headwaters of the San Gabriel River have retained their natural character and are a popular attraction of the Angeles National Forest.

== Geography and characteristics ==
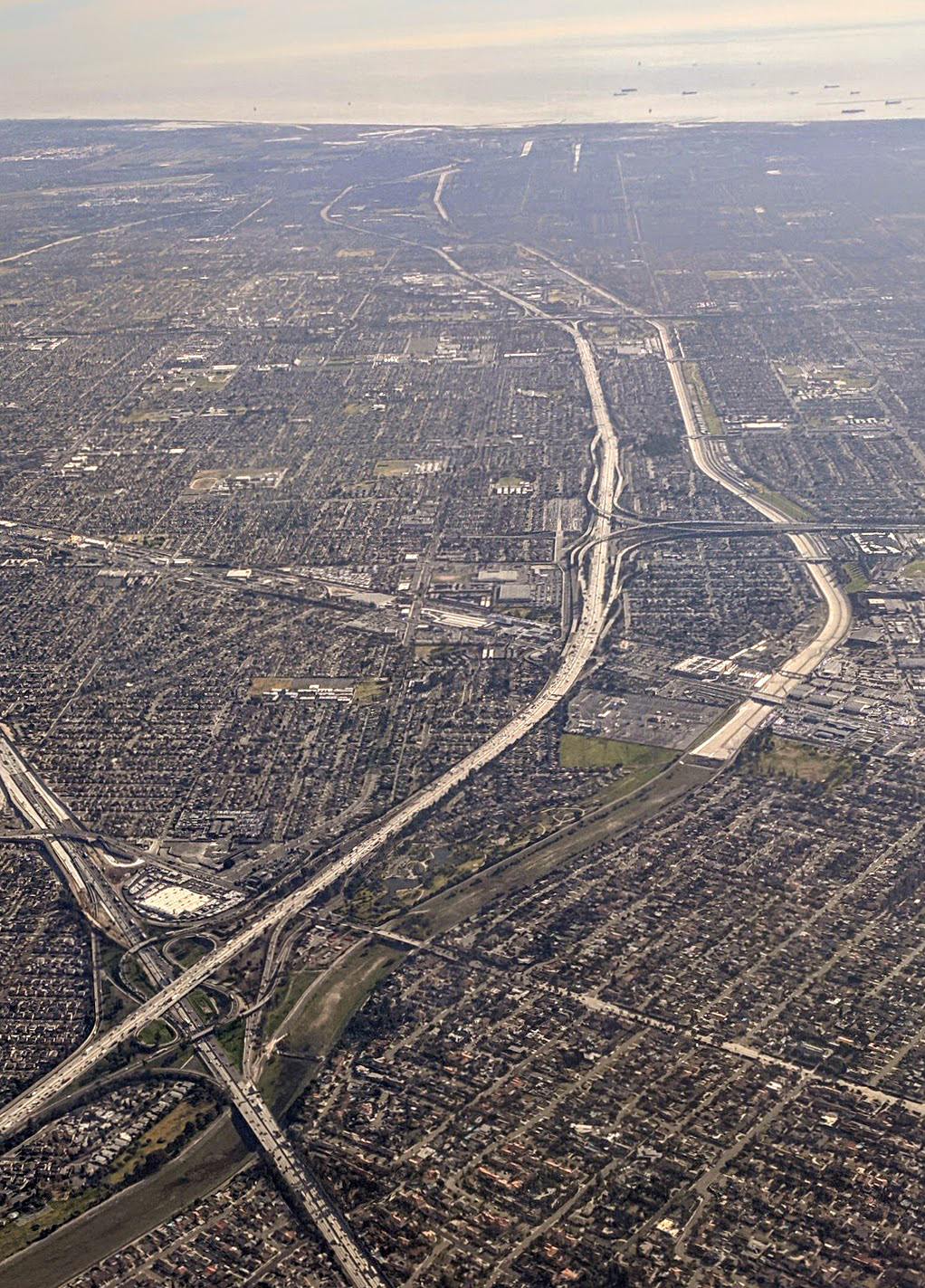
The San Gabriel River (right of the I-605 here) changes from dirt to concrete channel in Downey, near the Rio San Gabriel Park (right center)

The San Gabriel River basin drains a total of 689 square miles (1,780 km^{2}) and is located between the watersheds of the Los Angeles River to the west, the Santa Ana River to the east, and the Mojave Desert to the north. The watershed is divided into three distinct sections. The northern third, located within the Angeles National Forest of the San Gabriel Mountains, is steep and mountainous; it receives the most precipitation of any part of the basin – 33 inches (840 mm) per year – and as a result is the source of nearly all the natural runoff. Elevations reach up to 10,064 feet (3,068 m) at Mount San Antonio (Mount Baldy), the highest point of the range. During the winter, many elevations above 6,000 feet (1,800 m) are covered in snow.

The middle third, the San Gabriel Valley, and the southern third, the coastal plain of the Los Angeles Basin, are separated by the Puente Hills and Montebello Hills. With the exception of some recreation areas and lands set aside for flood control, the valleys are almost entirely urbanized. Approximately 2 million people live in the watershed, divided among 35 incorporated cities. Rainfall is slightly higher in the San Gabriel Valley than the coastal plain due to its proximity to the mountains; however, the climate as a whole is very arid, with only moderate precipitation in winter and nearly none in summer. The lower watershed consists primarily of alluvial plains that once experienced seasonal flooding from the San Gabriel River, creating vast swamps and wetlands. Today, very little of this original environment remains.

The San Gabriel is one of the largest natural streams in Southern California, but its discharge varies widely from year to year. Between 1895 and 1957 the mean unimpaired runoff at Azusa was estimated at 114,000 acre-feet (141,000,000 m^{3}), with a range from 9,600 to 410,000 acre-feet (11,800,000 to 505,700,000 m^{3}). Historically, the San Gabriel River reached its highest flows in the winter and spring, with runoff dropping significantly after early June before rising again with November or December storms. Today, the flow of the San Gabriel River has been dried up in places by dams, diversions, and groundwater recharge operations, and increased in other sections by wastewater run-off.

=== Headwaters ===
==== East Fork ====
The East Fork, 17 miles (27 km) long, is the largest headwater of the San Gabriel River; the U.S. Geological Survey considers it part of the main stem. However, it is colloquially known as the "East Fork" to distinguish it from the West Fork of the San Gabriel. Its furthest tributary, the Prairie Fork, originates at 9,648-foot (2,941 m) Pine Mountain in the Sheep Mountain Wilderness to the southwest of Wrightwood. Draining a high, remote, subalpine valley characterized by extensive meadows, it flows west to join with Vincent Gulch, below which the stream is officially known as the East Fork. Here it turns abruptly south, flowing through a steep, rugged canyon. It is joined from the east by the Fish Fork, which originates on the northwest slopes of Mount Baldy.

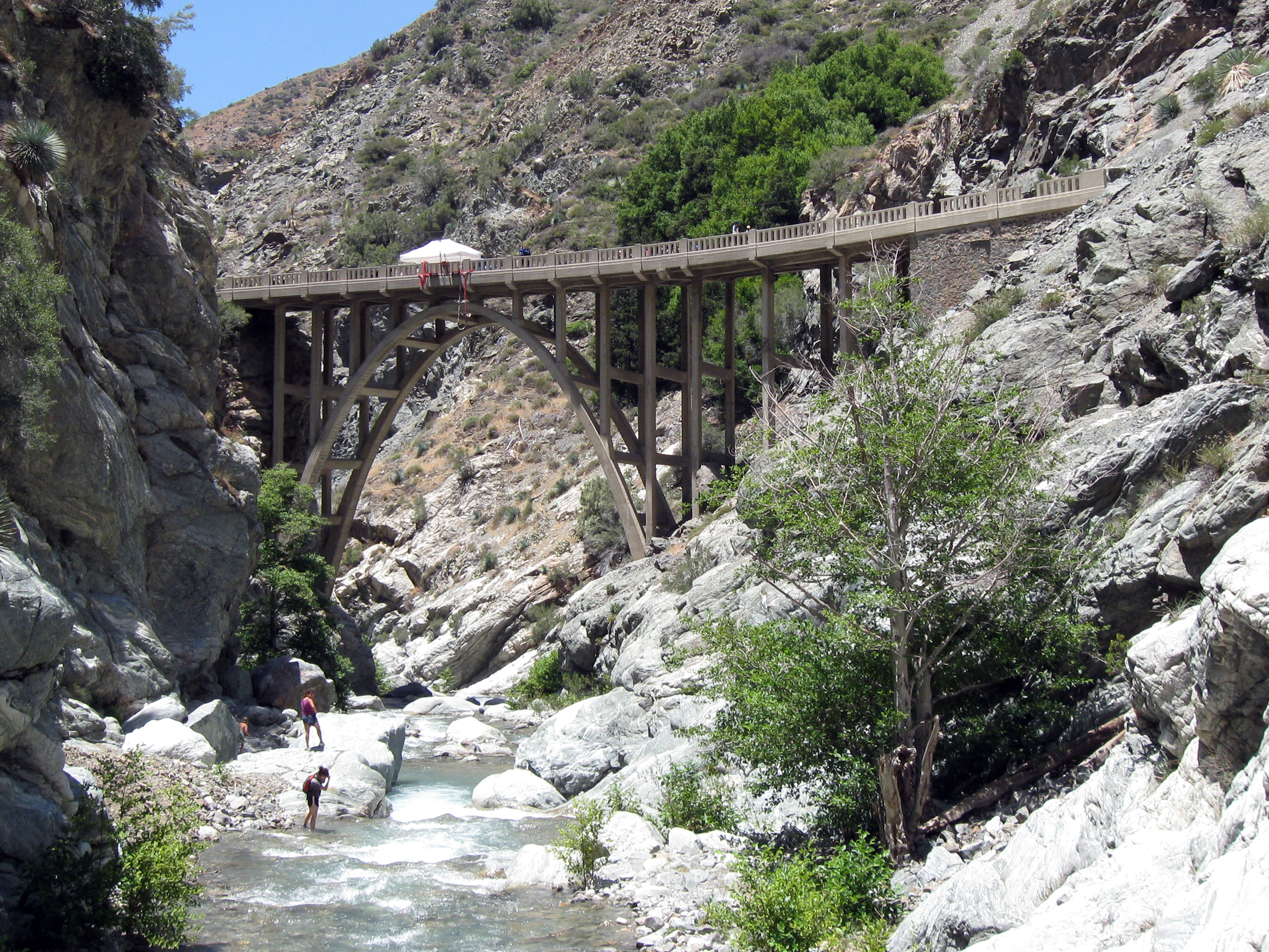
East Fork at the famed "Bridge to Nowhere"

Below the Fish Fork, the East Fork flows through "the Narrows", one of the deepest gorges in Southern California. From the floor of the canyon at 3,000 feet (910 m), Iron Mountain rises 8,007 feet (2,441 m) to the southeast, while Mount Hawkins, 8,850 feet (2,700 m), rises to the northwest. The Iron Fork tributary joins from the west roughly in the middle of the Narrows. Near the lower end of the Narrows, the river passes under the Bridge to Nowhere, a 120-foot-high (37 m) arch bridge that was abandoned after the huge flood of 1938 washed out a highway under construction along the East Fork. The bridge remains today as a popular destination for hikers and bungee jumpers.

After emerging from the Narrows, the river continues flowing south through a somewhat-more-open valley, receiving several tributaries including Devil Gulch and Allison Gulch, before reaching Heaton Flat, a popular trailhead and the end of the East Fork Road, which parallels the lower section of the river. The river receives Cattle Canyon, its biggest tributary, and then turns sharply west, flowing past the Camp Williams Resort and a number of U.S. Forest Service and Los Angeles County firefighting facilities before flowing into San Gabriel Reservoir, where it joins the West Fork.

==== West Fork ====
The West Fork, 19 miles (31 km) long, originates at Red Box Saddle, a visitor center and frequently used trailhead along the Angeles Crest Highway and about 2 miles (3.2 km) northwest of the summit of Mount Wilson. Beginning at an elevation of 4,666 feet (1,422 m), the West Fork flows at a much lower elevation than the East Fork and is the smaller of the two rivers in terms of water volume. The West Fork flows east in a fairly straight course for its entire length. From its headwater, the river quickly descends to the Cogswell Reservoir, where Devils Canyon Creek joins from the north. The Gabrielino Trail parallels the river from Red Box Saddle as far as the Devore campground, above Cogswell Reservoir.

Below Cogswell Dam, the river is paralleled by Forest Route 2N25, a one-lane paved road open only to non-motorized traffic (except for maintenance and emergency services). The river flows east through a twisting canyon, forming the southern boundary of the San Gabriel Wilderness. It receives the tributaries of Chileno Canyon, Little Mermaids Canyon, and Big Mermaids Canyon from the north, and then the much larger Bear Creek, which originates at Islip Saddle near the 8,250-foot (2,510 m) summit of Mount Islip. Less than a mile (1.6 km) below Bear Creek, it is joined by the North Fork before flowing into San Gabriel Reservoir, where it joins with the East Fork.

==== North Fork ====
The North Fork is the shortest and steepest of the three major forks. It begins as a series of streams falling off the crest of the range between Mount Islip and Mount Hawkins, more than 7,000 feet (2,100 m) above sea level. Cedar Creek flows south from Windy Gap, 7,588 feet (2,313 m), to join with Soldier Creek, which continues south past Falling Springs to join with Coldbrook Creek, forming the North Fork. The North Fork continues south for 4.5 miles (7.2 km) past Valley of the Moon Plantation, forming a braided channel along its relatively wide canyon floor. It flows into the West Fork just below Hoot Owl Flats, a short distance from the larger river's mouth at San Gabriel Reservoir.

The North Fork is the most heavily developed fork of the San Gabriel River, with many campgrounds and facilities along its course. The popular Crystal Lake Recreation Area in the upper North Fork includes the only natural lake in the San Gabriel Mountains. The North Fork valley provides the route for Highway 39, which until 1978 provided automobile access from San Gabriel Canyon Road to the Angeles Crest Highway. Since then, the upper part of the road north of Crystal Lake has been closed due to chronic landslides and erosion. As of 2016, there are no plans to reopen the road.

=== San Gabriel Canyon ===
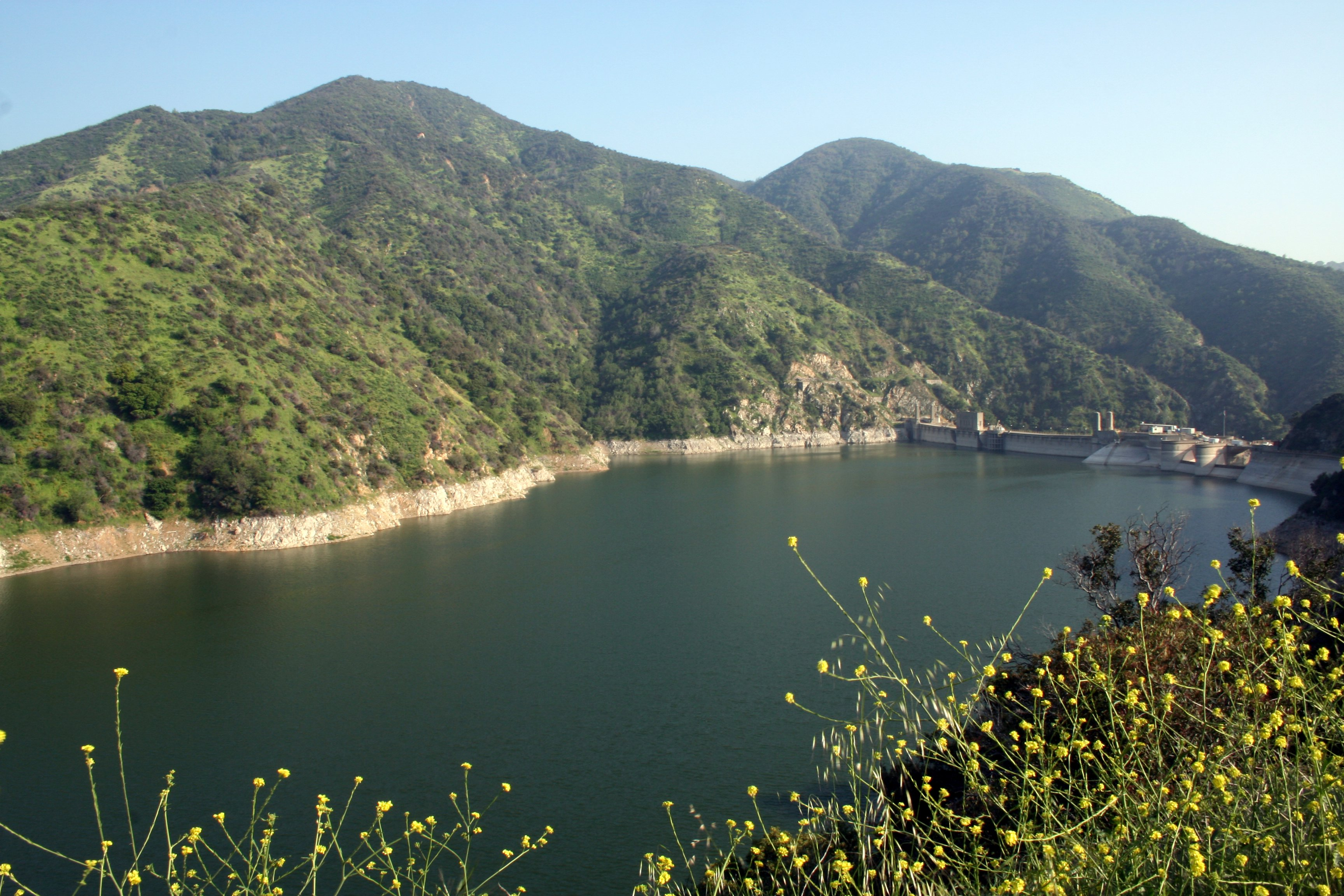
Morris Reservoir is the lower of two major reservoirs in San Gabriel Canyon

Below the confluence of the East Fork and West Fork, the San Gabriel River flows through the deep San Gabriel Canyon, the only major break in the southern part of the San Gabriel Mountains. Although this stretch of the river was once free-flowing, today is it impounded by major reservoirs for water supply and flood control. San Gabriel Dam, a 325-foot (99 m) high rockfill dam, forms the 44,183-acre-foot (54,499,000 m^{3}) San Gabriel Reservoir. The concrete gravity Morris Dam, just downstream, creates the 27,800-acre-foot (34,300,000 m^{3}) Morris Reservoir. A small hydroelectric plant in the city of Azusa is supplied with water from a diversion of the San Gabriel River, located directly below San Gabriel Dam.

The reservoir water levels fluctuate widely at the upper San Gabriel Reservoir, which serves mainly for flood control and sediment control. During the dry season the reservoir is often kept at a low level, in order to provide room for stormwater and allow county workers to remove built-up sediment from the basin. The northern part of the reservoir, when dry, is also used as the San Gabriel Canyon OHV area. There is no public boating access to either San Gabriel Reservoir or the downstream Morris Reservoir, which is used mainly for water supply. From World War II until the 1990s, Morris Reservoir was used by the U.S. Navy as a torpedo test site; the concrete launch ramp remains today and is easily seen from Highway 39, which runs through the canyon.

=== San Gabriel Valley ===
The river emerges from the San Gabriel Canyon at Azusa, a short distance below Morris Dam, where it reaches the wide and gently sloping alluvial plain of the San Gabriel Valley. At the mouth of the canyon, the entire flow of the river, except during wet seasons, is diverted into the first of several spreading grounds that recharge the local San Gabriel Valley aquifer, an important source of local water supply. The usually-dry riverbed then continues in a southwesterly direction, passing the ruins of the 1907 Puente Largo or "Great Bridge" that once carried Pacific Electric interurban trains, and under Interstate 210 into the flood control basin behind Santa Fe Dam. There are 17 drop structures or grade controls along this roughly 2-mile (3.2 km) stretch of river bed, to prevent erosion down the valley's relatively steep slope.

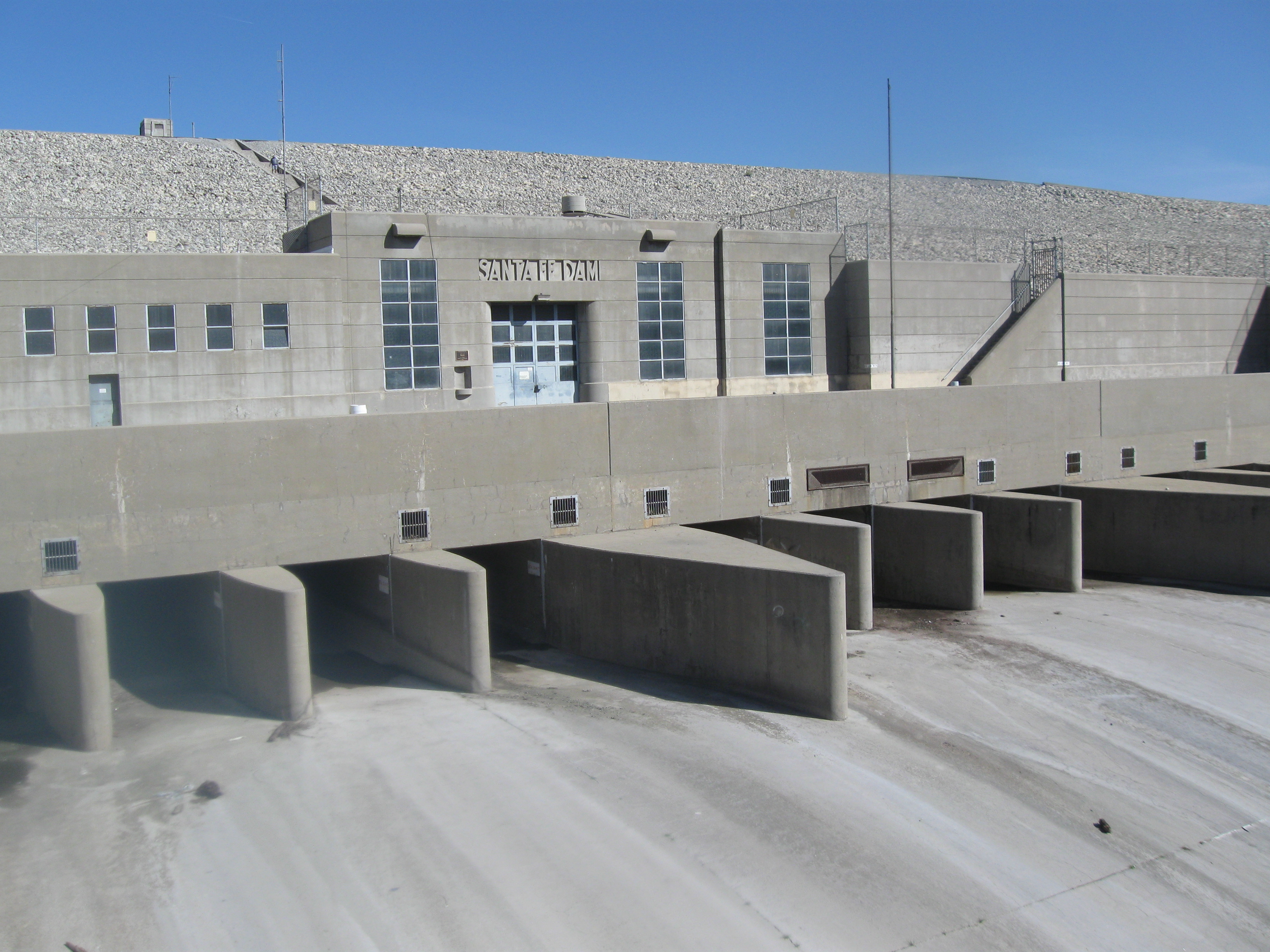
Outlet gates at Santa Fe Dam

Past the Santa Fe Dam – which when dry is used as the Santa Fe Dam Recreation Area – the river flows through Irwindale, where it is the site of several major gravel quarries, which have operated in the San Gabriel Valley since the early 1900s to mine the rich alluvial sediments deposited by the river over millennia. From here Interstate 605, the San Gabriel River Freeway, parallels the river's east bank almost all the way to its mouth in Seal Beach. Throughout the San Gabriel Valley, the river flows mainly in an earth-bottomed channel between artificial concrete or riprap banks. Shortly below Interstate 10 at El Monte, the river is joined from the east by Walnut Creek, which restores a small perennial flow. Below this confluence it curves west and receives San Jose Creek, also from the east, before passing under SR 60.

The river then enters the Whittier Narrows, the natural water gap between the Puente and Montebello Hills that forms the southern entrance to the San Gabriel Valley. Here it is impounded by the Whittier Narrows Dam, which serves primarily for flood control. The Rio Hondo also flows through the Whittier Narrows, to the west of the San Gabriel. The Rio Hondo drains most of the western half of the San Gabriel Valley, approaching the San Gabriel River at the Whittier Narrows; south of there, it swings to the southwest and joins the Los Angeles River. In the Whittier Narrows, they are connected by a short channel through which water can flow in both directions.

The Rio Hondo is generally considered a separate stream and tributary to the Los Angeles River, but historically the two rivers sometimes joined the other, flowing to various outlets. The Rio Hondo sometimes changed course to join the San Gabriel River; alternatively, the San Gabriel sometimes shifted course into the Rio Hondo, merging into a single watershed with the Los Angeles River. Whittier Narrows Dam controls the outflow from both rivers into their artificially fixed channels. During storms, water is distributed based on the availability of space in the downstream channels.

=== Lower river ===
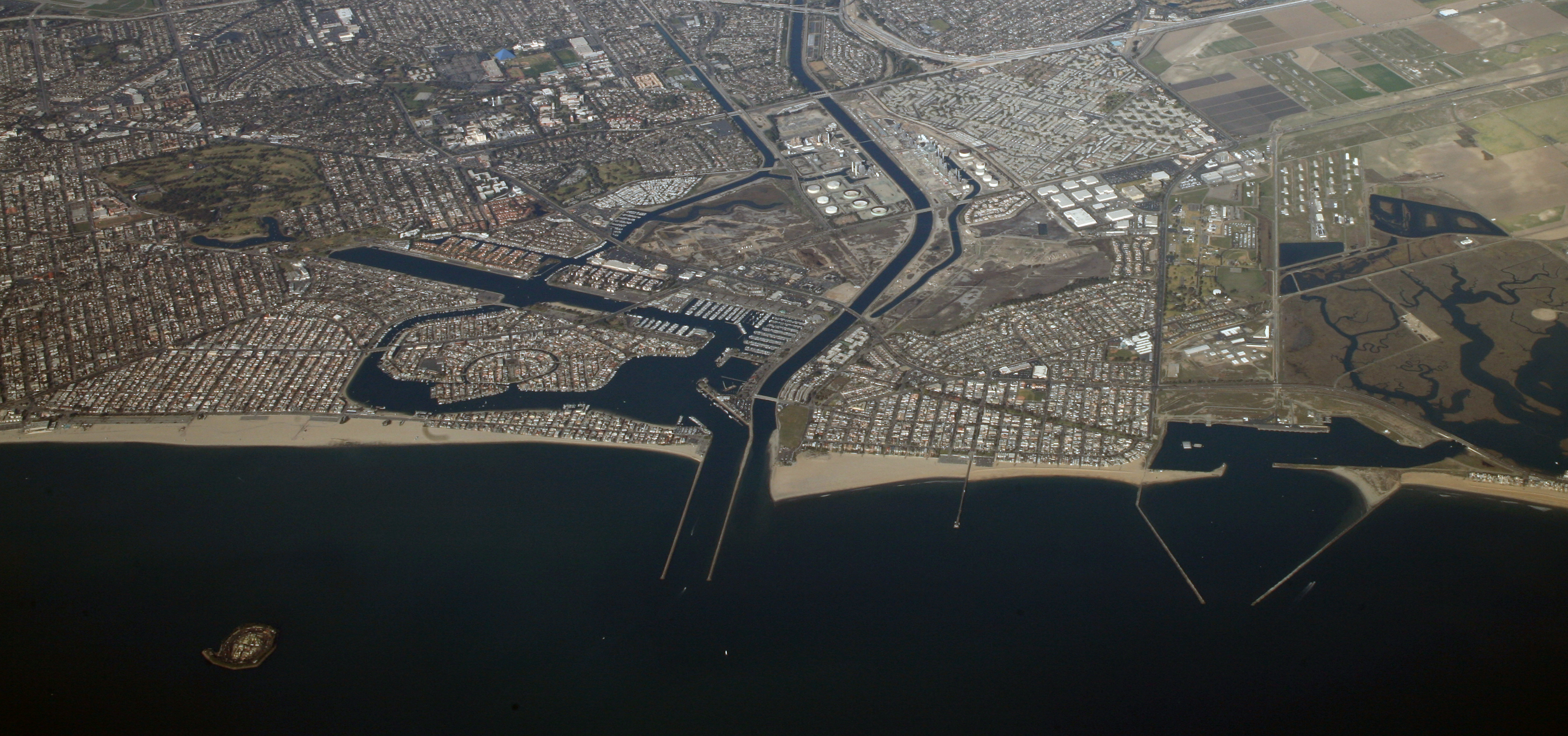
The mouth of the San Gabriel River, at Seal Beach

Below the Whittier Narrows Dam, the river flows south-southwest across the coastal plain, roughly defining the border of Los Angeles County and Orange County. It flows through Whittier and Pico Rivera and under the Interstate 5 to Downey, where the river becomes a concrete channel. It turns due south, crossing under Interstate 105 and the Metro C Line, then crossing under SR 91 at Bellflower. The San Gabriel River Bike Trail parallels the river starting at Whittier Narrows for 28 miles (45 km) to the Pacific Ocean at Seal Beach.

From Cerritos the river flows south-southeast until reaching its confluence with Coyote Creek, the largest tributary of the lower river, which drains much of northwest Orange County. A short distance below Coyote Creek, the river bed reverts from concrete to earth. It passes under Interstate 405 and SR 22, past Leisure World and Joint Forces Training Base - Los Alamitos (Los Alamitos Army Airfield), and under the Pacific Coast Highway. It empties into the Pacific Ocean between Alamitos Bay and Anaheim Bay (to the south), on the boundary of Long Beach in Los Angeles County, and Seal Beach in Orange County.

== Geology ==
The San Gabriel River, its canyons, and its floodplain are relatively young in geological terms, and owe their existence to tectonic forces along the San Andreas Fault (the boundary between the North American Plate and Pacific Plate) and its subsidiary fault and fracture zones. The San Gabriel Mountains are a fault block mountain range, essentially a massive chunk of bedrock dislocated from the North American Plate and lifted up by movement along the San Andreas. The rock is mostly of Mesozoic origin (65–245 million years old), but the deepest layers are up to 4 billion years old. However, the uplift of the present mountain range did not start until about 6 million years ago. The mountains are still rising as much as 2 inches (51 mm) per year due to tectonic action along the San Andreas Fault. The Puente and Montebello hills are even younger, no more than 1.8 million years old. As the hills formed, the San Gabriel River maintained its original course, cutting the water gap of the Whittier Narrows.

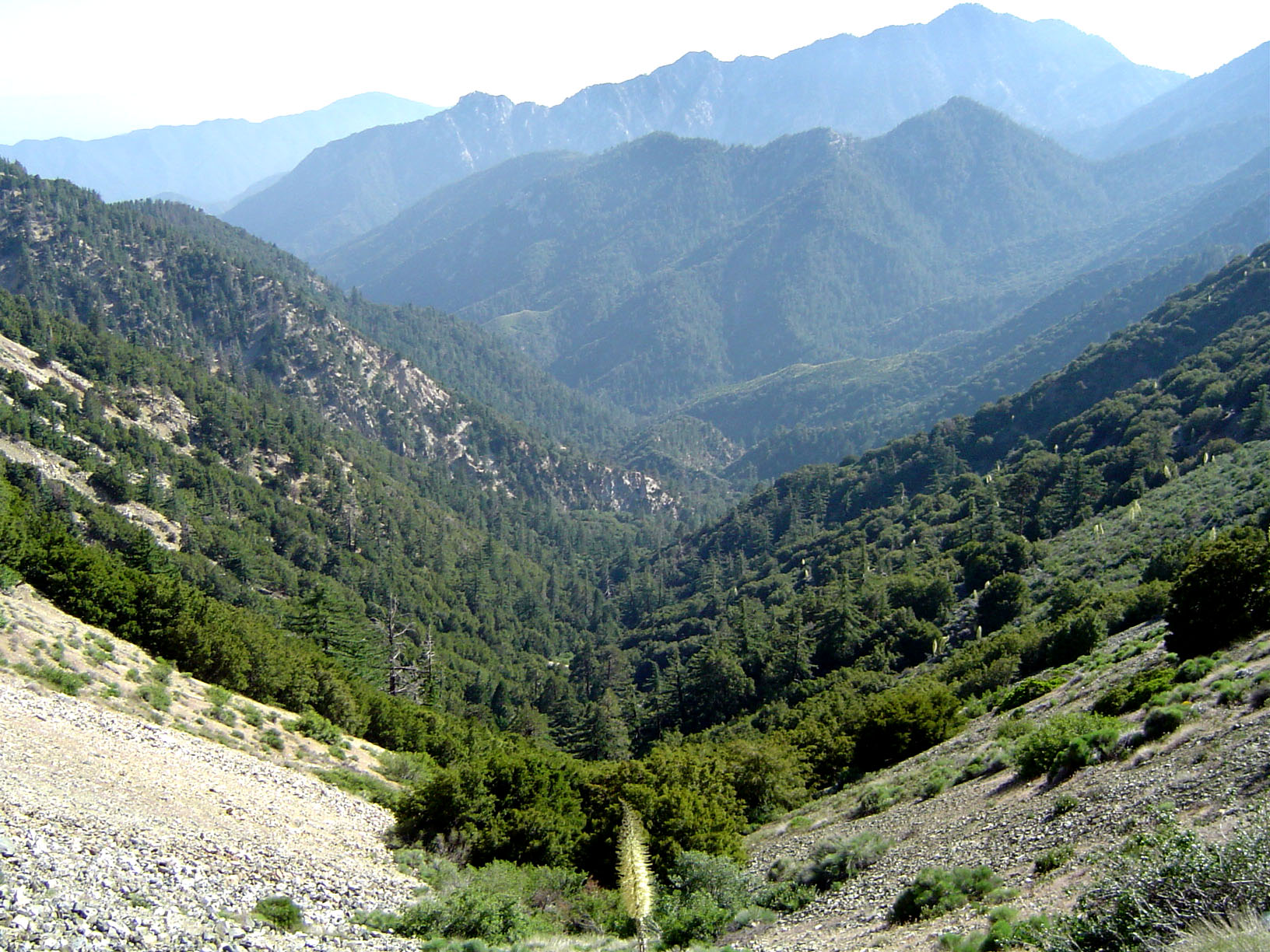
Looking south down Bear Creek, a tributary of the West Fork San Gabriel River

Composed of ancient, highly fractured and unstable crystalline rock, the San Gabriel mountains are subject to tremendous amounts of erosion. Rapid erosion caused by heavy winter storms has created the dramatic canyons of the San Gabriel River. In the headwaters, streams often follow fault traces; the West Fork and part of the East Fork run along the San Gabriel Canyon Fault, which extends in a nearly straight line from east to west across the center of the San Gabriel Mountains. In the winter, the mountain regions are prone to landslides and destructive debris flows, which has required the construction of many debris basins to protect foothill communities such as Glendora and Monrovia, but these works have not always been effective during the biggest storms.

During floods, the river transports large volumes of sediment from the mountains into the San Gabriel Valley, ranging from fine sands, gravels, clays, and silt to car-sized boulders. Starting in the Pliocene, about 5 million years ago, the Los Angeles Basin experienced considerable tectonic subsidence; at the same time, the San Gabriel River was depositing a huge alluvial fan, essentially an inland delta, radiating from the mouth of San Gabriel Canyon. This has combined with smaller alluvial fans from other drainages along the front range of the San Gabriels to form the flat valley floor. In the San Gabriel Valley, riverine alluvium deposits can be up to 10,000 feet (3,000 m) deep. On the coastal plain, San Gabriel River sediments are interbedded with those from the nearby Los Angeles River as well as marine sediments left behind from ancient sea level changes.

Prior to the development of the floodplain, the river channels down the alluvial slope were poorly defined at best and frequently changed course with winter storms, leaping back and forth between several different ocean outlets. In some years it joined with the Rio Hondo, which flows parallel to the San Gabriel and also passes through the Whittier Narrows, and flowed into the Los Angeles River; in others it would swing south toward either Alamitos Bay or Anaheim Bay, or even east towards the Santa Ana River. Once every few decades, a particularly intense storm would cause the rivers to burst their banks simultaneously, inundating the coastal plain in a continuous sheet of floodwater. The historical floodplain encompassed much of the San Gabriel Valley and a huge expanse of the Los Angeles Basin stretching from present-day Whittier to Seal Beach.

The thick sediments of the lowland also trap an extensive local aquifer system. Historically, the aquifer was quite pressurized and close to the surface; natural artesian wells existed in many places. At the southern end of the San Gabriel Valley, groundwater rose to the surface due to the damming effect of bedrock at the Whittier Narrows and formed a perennial stream that ran across the coastal plain to the Pacific. In the 19th century, irrigated agriculture was developed on a large scale in the San Gabriel Valley, resulting in a severe decline of the water table as farmers drilled hundreds of wells. The San Gabriel Valley aquifer is now an important source of domestic and industrial water, and groundwater recharge operations are conducted using both local runoff from the San Gabriel River, and water imported through Los Angeles's aqueduct system.

== Ecology and environment ==
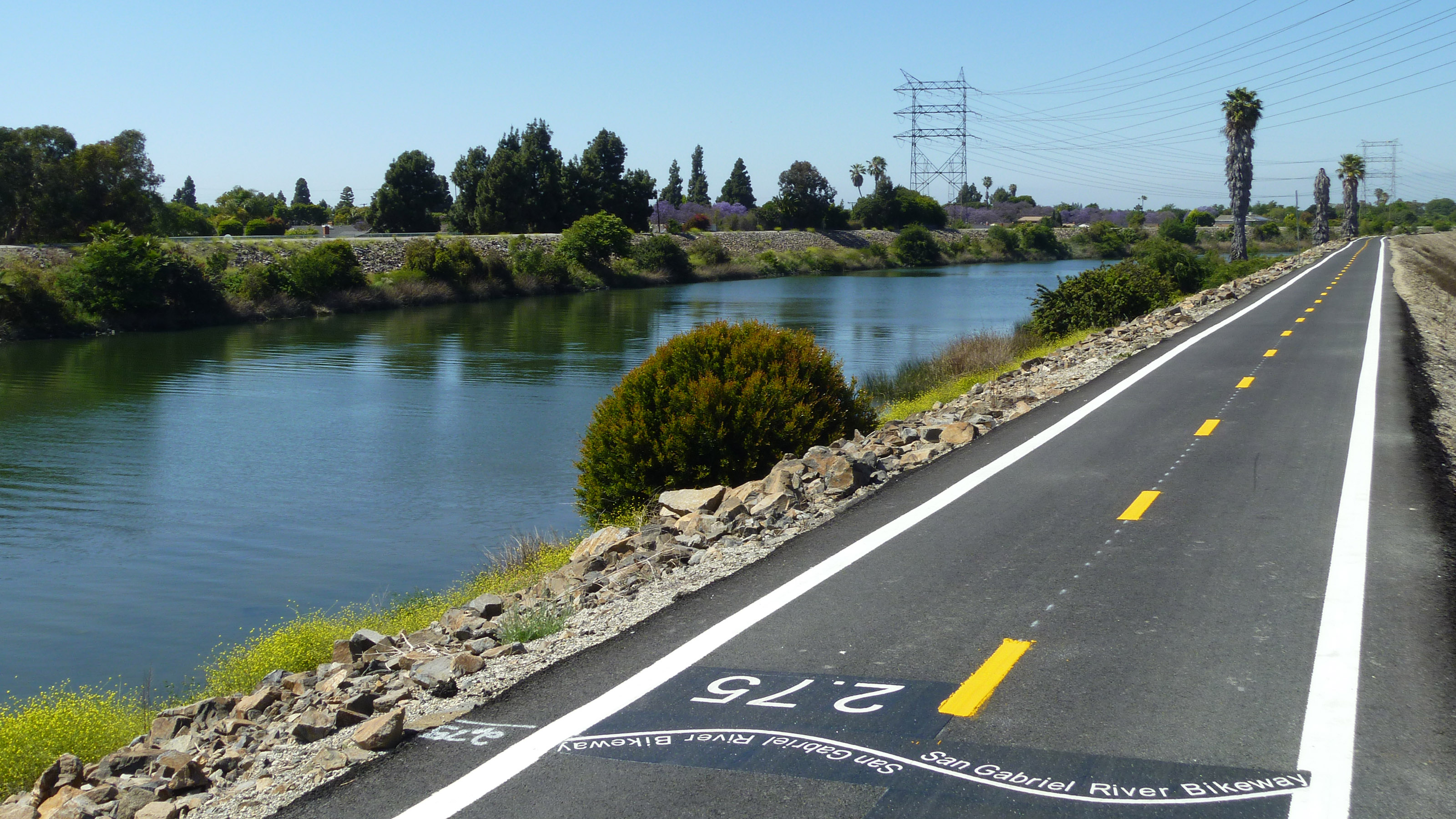
Riparian vegetation along the channelized lower San Gabriel River, seen from the adjacent bike path

The San Gabriel River once supported a rich lowland ecosystem on its broad floodplain, inundated multiple times each year by rain and snowmelt. The result of this overflow was a 47,000-acre (19,000 ha) network of riparian and wetland habitats, ranging from seasonally flooded areas in the north to alkali meadows (called "cienegas" by the Spanish), forests of willows, oaks, and cottonwoods, and both fresh- and salt-water marshes in the south. At its mouth, the river emptied into a broad estuary surrounded by thousands of acres of permanent marsh and swamp land, the result of a band of bedrock running parallel to the coast, forcing groundwater to the surface. In mountain areas, the San Gabriel River channel is often too narrow to support significant vegetation, as winter floods tend to scour the channel down to bare rock.

Below the mountains, most of the streams are locked in artificial channels, and the vast majority of the original wetlands have been lost to urban development. Less than 2,500 acres (1,000 ha) of wetlands remain in the San Gabriel River watershed, with the greatest decline in the coastal floodplain zone. Most remaining wetland habitats are either immediately adjacent to the river, or within the Whittier Narrows and other flood control basins, providing habitat to birds and small mammals. In addition, riparian and wetland restoration projects have been completed or are in progress along the river. The San Gabriel River Wetland Restoration Development intends to construct by 2018 an artificial wetland and bioswale system near El Monte which will provide a recreation area and wildlife habitat and buffer against pollution.

Above elevations of 7,000 feet (2,100 m), the San Gabriel Mountains support some pine and fir forests, remnants or relicts of a huge evergreen (coniferous) forest that once covered Southern California during the last ice age when the regional climate was much wetter. The montane forests are home to large mammals such as deer and black bears. Due to conservation policies put in place by the 19th century, the upper San Gabriel watershed was never subjected to heavy logging. Also in the San Gabriel River watershed is the 17,000-acre (6,900 ha) San Dimas Experimental Forest, a UNESCO Biosphere Reserve where forest hydrology has been continually studied since 1933. Lower down in the foothill zones, chaparral and brush dominate. The Puente Hills, which bisect the lower San Gabriel watershed, contain some sensitive plant communities such as coastal sage scrub and walnut forests.

Wildfires are a natural part of plant communities in the San Gabriel River watershed. After the flood of 1938, an intense program of wildfire suppression began, since burned areas tend to erode quickly during storms, causing landslides and mudflows down tributary canyons. Like many other areas of the western United States, this has caused a large amount of tinder and debris to accumulate, increasing the risk of fire. Drought conditions in the first decade of the 21st century led to huge fires much larger than would have occurred naturally. In 2002, the Curve Fire burned 20,000 acres (8,100 ha), much of it in the North Fork of the San Gabriel River, closing Crystal Lake Recreation Area for several years. The 2009 Station Fire, the largest wildfire in Los Angeles County's history, was mostly concentrated west of the San Gabriel watershed, but did burn much of the upper West Fork. With urban development expanding toward mountain areas, the threat of property damage continues to increase.

The San Gabriel River historically supported large populations of native fish, including the largest runs of steelhead in Southern California. Steelhead once migrated over 60 miles (97 km) upriver from the Pacific Ocean to spawn, and it was known as one of the "best steelhead fishing rivers in the state". Irrigation development that dried up the river, and later damming and channelization for flood control, have contributed to the near extinction of steelhead in the San Gabriel basin. Since the 19th century rainbow trout have been planted in the upper forks of the San Gabriel River to provide a recreational fishery. About 60,000 rainbows are stocked each year between October and June. The West Fork also has the largest remaining population of arroyo chub, Santa Ana Sucker and Santa Ana speckled dace, all fish endemic to coastal Southern California streams. This makes it an incredibly valuable restoration area.

The San Gabriel River Canyon is also home to a rare endemic species of salamander, the San Gabriel slender salamander, which is only known to be found above 850 metres elevation in the San Gabriel Mountains.

== Human history ==
=== Native Americans ===
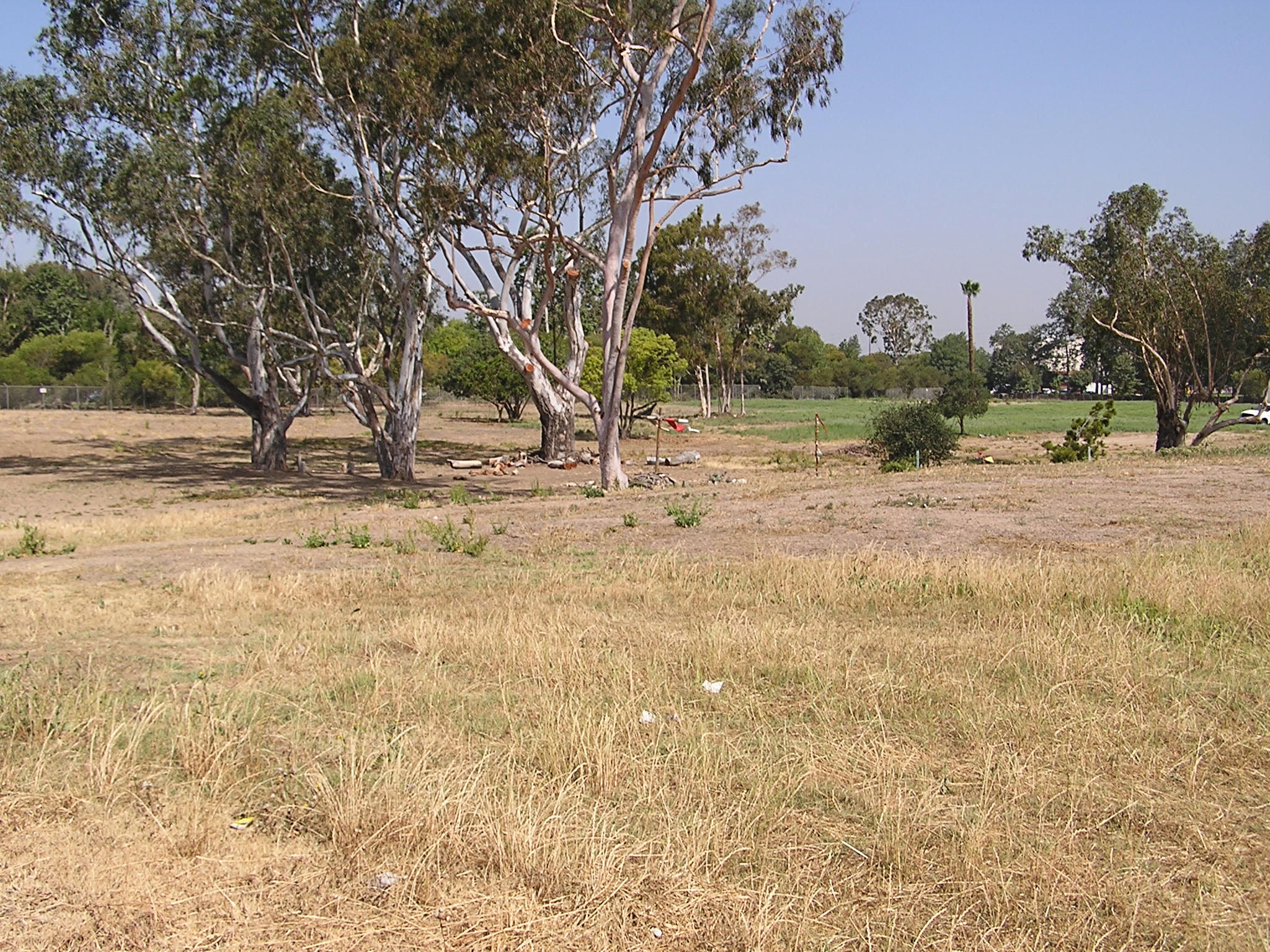
Puvunga was major village located at the mouth of the San Gabriel River. It was a ceremonial and regional trade center. In 1974, it was listed on the National Register of Historic Places.

Although the first recorded inhabitants of the San Gabriel River area arrived about 2,500 years ago, humans may have been present in Southern California as early as 12,000 years ago. Immediately prior to the arrival of Spanish explorers in the region, the native population is estimated at 5,000–10,000. Mount San Antonio provided a visual reference for the boundary of the Tongva (Gabrielino) people in the west and the Yuhaviatam people to the east. Most of the San Gabriel River lay in traditional Tongva territory, although the Chumash (who inhabited areas further west) also used the area. Tongva villages such as Puvunga were located on high ground above the reach of winter floods. A typical village consisted of large, circular thatched huts known as "kich" or "kish", each home to multiple families.

During summer, the villagers would travel up the San Gabriel Canyon into the mountains to gather food and other resources needed to pass the winter. The San Gabriel River itself also provided sustenance to Native Americans with its steelhead trout and game animals attracted by this rare permanent water source. The abundant plant life around the river and its marshes, especially tule, were used to build dwellings and canoes. The Tongva often set brush fires to clear out old growth, improving forage for game animals. They also made oceangoing canoes (ti'at) using wooden planks held together with asphaltum or tar from local oil seeps.

At least 26 Tongva villages were located along the San Gabriel River, and another 18 close by. One of the largest Tongva villages, Asuksangna (meaning "place of the grandmothers") was located at the mouth of the San Gabriel Canyon. The West Fork of the San Gabriel River Canyon formed part of a trade route that crossed the San Gabriel Mountains, enabling the Tongva to trade with the Serrano people in the Mojave Desert to the north. Many other villages were located near the San Gabriel River. The San Gabriel Valley, with its fertile soils and higher rainfall than the coastal plain, had the highest population density. Villages in the San Gabriel Valley included Alyeupkigna, Amuscopopiabit, Awingna, Comicranga, Cucamonga, Guichi, Houtgna, Isanthcogna, Juyubit, Perrooksnga, Sibagna, and Toviseanga. The village of Sejat was located at the Whittier Narrows. Puvugna was situated around present-day Long Beach, near the river's mouth.

The first explorers to make contact with the Tongva described them as a peaceful people. Anthropologists believe the Tongva may have been some of the more advanced native inhabitants of California, establishing currency and complex trade systems with neighboring tribes, cultivating trees and plants for food, and having a formal government structure. Indian Agent B.D. Wilson wrote in 1852 the Tongva knew "how to meet the environmental challenge without destroying the environment."

=== Exploration and settlement ===
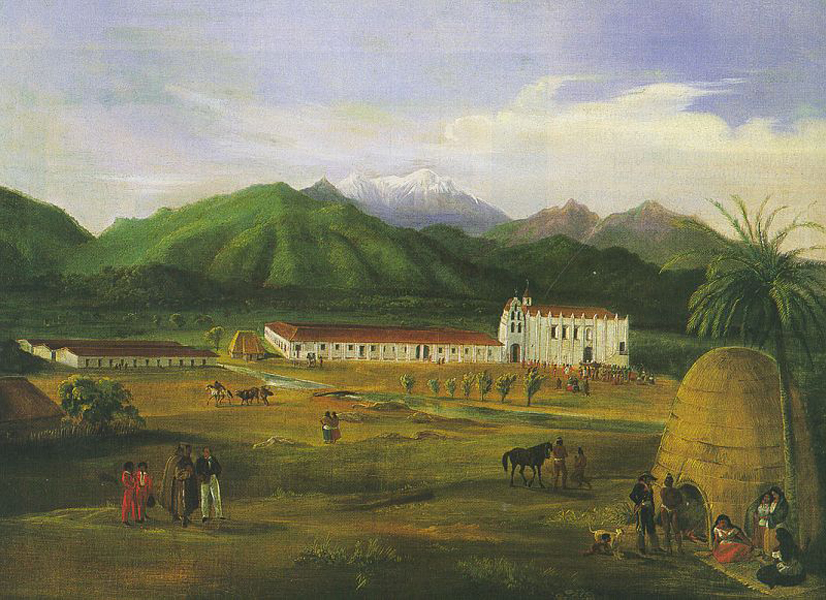
Mission San Gabriel Arcángel was established in 1771 by Junípero Serra and later moved to the site of the village of Toviscanga in 1776.

The abundant water available in the San Gabriel River basin, a rarity in arid Southern California, was noted by early Spanish explorers and made it an attractive place for Europeans to settle later on. Juan Rodriguez Cabrillo sailed past the mouth of the San Gabriel River in 1542; although he did not land here, he did make contact with the native Tongva, who rowed out in their canoes to greet the expedition. The first Spanish party to actually cross the river was the Portolà expedition, led in 1769 by Captain Gaspar de Portolà. Juan Crespí, a missionary traveling with the expedition, described their first impression of the San Gabriel River:

We then descended to a broad and spacious plain ... After traveling for an hour through the valley we came to an arroyo of water which flows among many green marshes, their banks covered with willows and grapes, blackberries, and innumerable Castilian rosebushes ... It runs along the foot of the mountains, and can be easily used to irrigate the large area of good land ... The valley ... is surrounded by ranges of hills. The one to the north is very high and dark and has many corrugations, and seems to run farther to the west.

— Juan Crespí's diary, July 30, 1769

The expedition had to build a bridge across the river because the channel was too swampy and muddy, making it difficult to move their horses and supplies. The area came to be known as "la puente" (the bridge), from which the modern-day city of La Puente takes its name.

Following the Portolà expedition, Spain claimed California as part of its empire, and the San Gabriel River was referred to as "Río San Miguel Arcángel". Mission San Gabriel Arcángel, the fourth in a chain of missions along the California coast, was founded in 1771 by Junípero Serra, along the San Gabriel River near present-day Montebello. The name of the mission was soon attached to the river as well as the San Gabriel Mountains, which had been previously called the Sierra Madre by the Spanish. The original site suffered chronic flooding and was moved to its present site in San Gabriel, 5 miles (8.0 km) northwest, in 1775. The mission eventually controlled 1,500,000 acres (610,000 ha) of land extending from the foot of the mountains as far as present-day San Pedro.

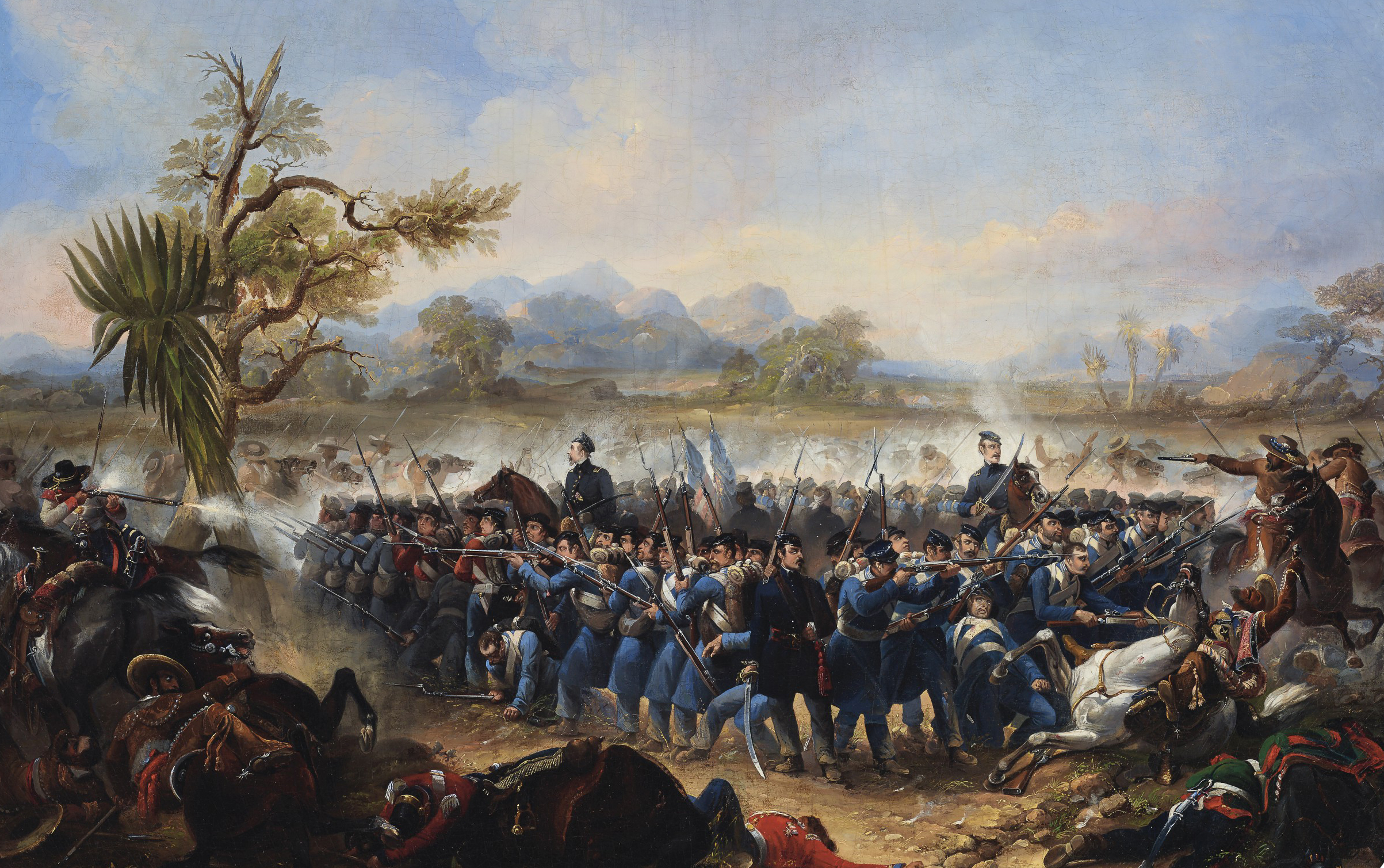
The 1847 Battle of Río San Gabriel was a decisive victory of American forces against the Californios during the U.S. conquest of California.

Under the policy of reducción, the purpose being to "reduce or consolidate the Indians from the countryside into one central community", the Spanish incentivized Native Americans to joining the mission system first via gifts, but also often by force. Native people worked on farms and ranches of the mission lands, and were converted to Christianity. The Spanish name "Gabrieliño" generally refers to the Tongva people of the area although people from some other groups, such as the Chumash, were also present at the San Gabriel mission. Native Americans fleeing the mission system took refuge in the upper canyons of the San Gabriel River where a significant resistance movement persisted for many years. This culminated in the San Gabriel mission uprising in 1785, led by Tongva medicine woman Toypurina, ultimately crushed by the Spanish.

Disease severely reduced the native populations, and by the beginning of the 19th century, most of the surviving Gabrieliño had entered the mission system. In 1830, nine years after California had become a part of Mexico, the indigenous population had fallen to about a quarter of what it had been before Spanish colonization.

In order to attract settlers to the region, Spain and later Mexico established a system of large land grants which became the many ranchos of the area. The decline of Native American populations made it easy for colonists to seize large areas of land formerly used by the indigenous people. During the Spanish-controlled period, and the Mexican-controlled period between 1821 and 1846, cattle ranching dominated the local economy. In the San Gabriel River watershed, the Rancho Azusa de Dalton and Rancho Azusa de Duarte lay, respectively, to the east and west of the San Gabriel Canyon mouth. Rancho San Francisquito, Rancho Potrero Grande, Rancho Potrero de Felipe Lugo, Rancho La Puente, and Rancho La Merced were located further south in the San Gabriel Valley. Rancho Paso de Bartolo was situated in the Whittier Narrows area, and Rancho Santa Gertrudes, Rancho Los Coyotes, Rancho Los Cerritos and Rancho Los Alamitos occupied various areas of the coastal plain.

California became a U.S. state in 1850, two years after the Mexican–American War. One of the decisive battles of the war was fought on January 8, 1847 on the San Gabriel River, which was the last line of defense for Mexican Californio forces led by Mexican Governor-General José Flores, tasked with defending the pueblo of Los Angeles. American forces, led by General Stephen W. Kearney under Commodore Robert F. Stockton, crossed the river under heavy fire, but were able to force the Californios from their defensive position in under ninety minutes. After taking control of the river, the Americans were able to take Los Angeles on January 10, and the Mexicans surrendered California three days later. This campaign is now remembered as the Battle of Rio San Gabriel.

=== Gold seekers ===
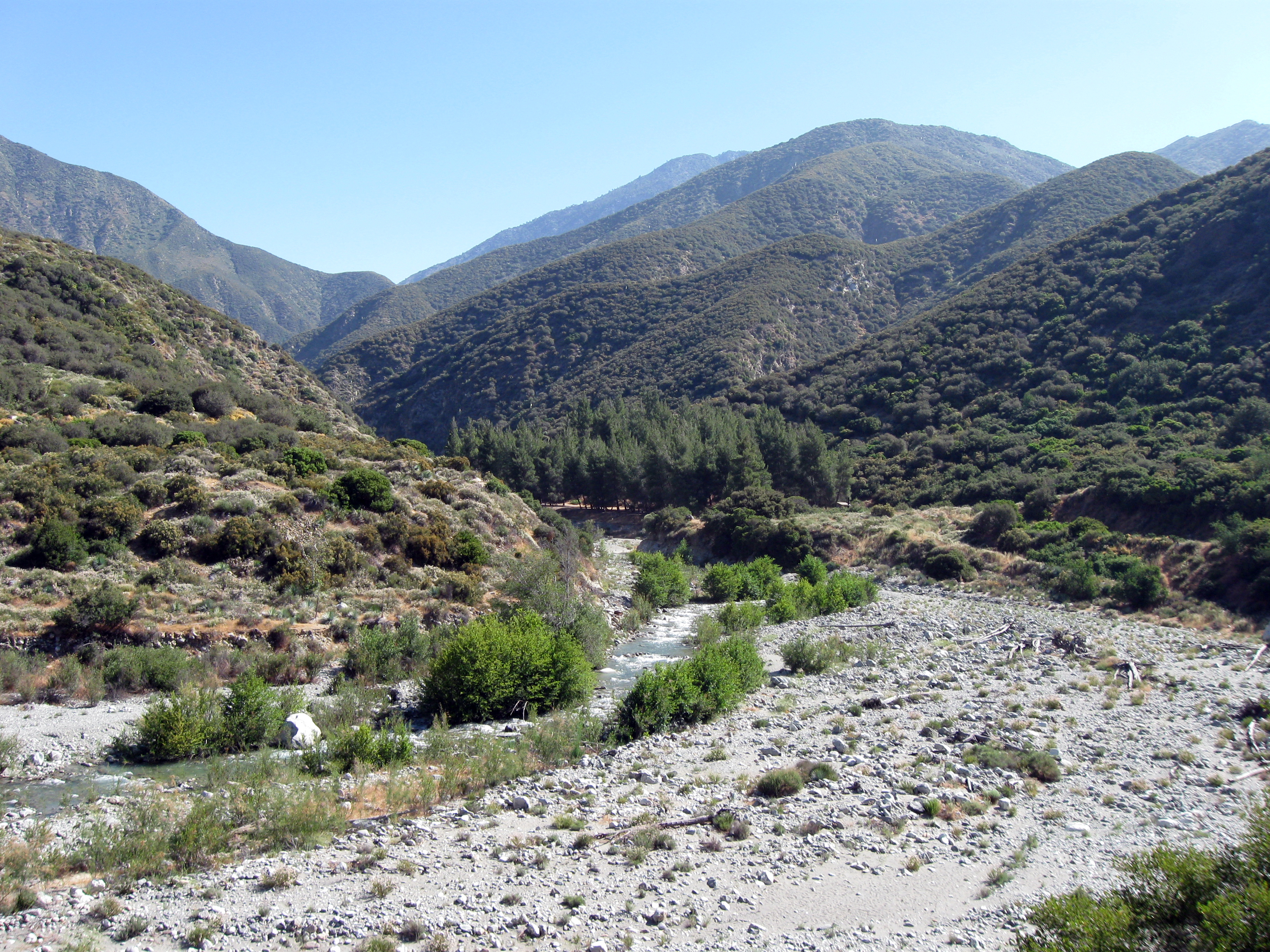
The East Fork at Heaton Flats, near the original site of Eldoradoville, which the river destroyed during the 1862 flood.

Although it was rumored for many years that Native Americans and Spanish explorers had discovered gold in the San Gabriel Canyon long before California became a U.S. state, gold was first confirmed in the upper San Gabriel River around April 1855, by a party of prospectors who had entered the mountains via Cajon Pass. The Los Angeles Star soon reported of their findings:

There has been some excitement this past week about the new gold diggings on the headwaters of the San Gabriel. We have met several persons who have been prospecting and although they found gold of the best quality, differ very much as regards to the richness of the mine. The Crab Hollow diggings are now considered the best and will pay from two to five cents to the pan.

The river remained quiet for a number of years, as drought conditions reduced streamflow and made placer mining difficult. The winter of 1858-59 was a wet one, and soon hundreds of gold seekers from both Los Angeles County and Kern County further north descended on the river. By May 1859, claims were staked along 40 miles (64 km) of the San Gabriel Canyon. In the early days, access to the diggings proved difficult, as the rocky San Gabriel River bed was the only way into the rugged mountains. In July 1859, stagecoach service was established to bring in miners and their supplies.

Between 1855 and 1902, an estimated $5,000,000 ($161 million in 2025 dollars) worth of gold was removed from the San Gabriel River. Mining along the San Gabriel River began with simple gold panning, but soon developed to more advanced methods. Flumes were constructed to carry water to sluices, long toms, and hydraulic mining operations that separated gold from river gravel; dams and waterwheels helped maintain the necessary head to drive these extensive waterworks and clear the riverbed so that gold-bearing sands could be excavated. Some hard rock (tunnel) mining also occurred in the San Gabriels in later years, such as at the 1896 Big Horn Mine at Mount Baden-Powell, and the 1913 Allison Mine on Iron Mountain high above the East Fork, where several tunnels of up to 1,000 feet (300 m) in length remain.

Settlements of considerable size were established in very rough country along the upper San Gabriel River. Prospect Bar, located 4 miles (6.4 km) up the narrow canyon of the East Fork, grew to include "a boarding house, two or three stores, blacksmith shop, butcher shop, etc." A flood in November 1859 destroyed the settlement, but four months later it was re-established as the town of Eldoradoville, near the junction of the East Fork and Cattle Canyon. The period from 1859 to 1862 was the most prosperous of the San Gabriel gold rush; Wells Fargo stages alone shipped some $15,000 ($483,750 in 2025 dollars) worth of gold per month out of Los Angeles County, most of it from the San Gabriel diggings. John Robb, who ran a saloon in Eldoradoville, claimed he "made more money by running the sawdust from the floor of the Union Saloon through his sluice box than he was able to make from real mining, so prodigal and careless of their pokes were the miners and gamblers of those days."

By 1861, Eldoradoville had an estimated population of 1,500. The town prospered until the Great Flood of 1862, the largest in California's recorded history, swept the canyon clean:

Nature once again played its violent hand. Beginning the final week of December 1861, the weather turned bad. Rain fell daily for three weeks, and nervous miners and Eldoradoville residents watched the river slowly rise along its banks. During the night of January 17–18, 1862, a torrential cloudburst hit the mountains. Early the next morning, a wall of churning gray water swept down the canyon, obliterating everything in its path. As the men of Eldoradoville scrambled up the hillsides to safety, the shanty town was literally washed away lock, stock and barrel, as were all the canyon-bottom works belonging to the miners. Shacks, whiskey barrels, groceries, beds, roulette wheels, sluices, long toms, wing dams and China pumps were swept clean out of the mountains into the floodplain of the San Gabriel Valley.

Mining on the San Gabriel did continue after the flood of 1862, but never on the same scale as before. A second wave of gold seeking began in the early 1930s along the East Fork. A September 1932 Los Angeles Times article described it as a "leisurely gold rush" and reported:

Today there are slightly more than 500 persons scattered along the stream in the canyon, of which thirty are women and a score children. The live in shacks, tents, lean-tos and even in ramshackle automobiles. They form an amazing heterogeneous collection of humans, their numbers being made up of members of many professions, extremely few of them with previous prospecting experience.

Several gold mining camps sprang up along the East Fork, the largest including the Upper and Lower Klondike. Mining during the 1930s focused on finding the finer particles and dust left behind from the previous gold boom. For many, it was a source of income during the Great Depression, and for some others was a recreational activity. These mining camps were again obliterated, along with much else along the San Gabriel River, during the great flood of 1938.

Recreational gold mining has continued along the San Gabriel River since then, although it is not legal in many places. Current U.S. Forest Service policy states that "National Forest System lands within the East Fork of the San Gabriel River are not open to prospecting or any other mining operations." However, the ban is rarely enforced and has been subject to much controversy, especially since it does not distinguish between recreational and commercial mining.

=== Farming and irrigation ===
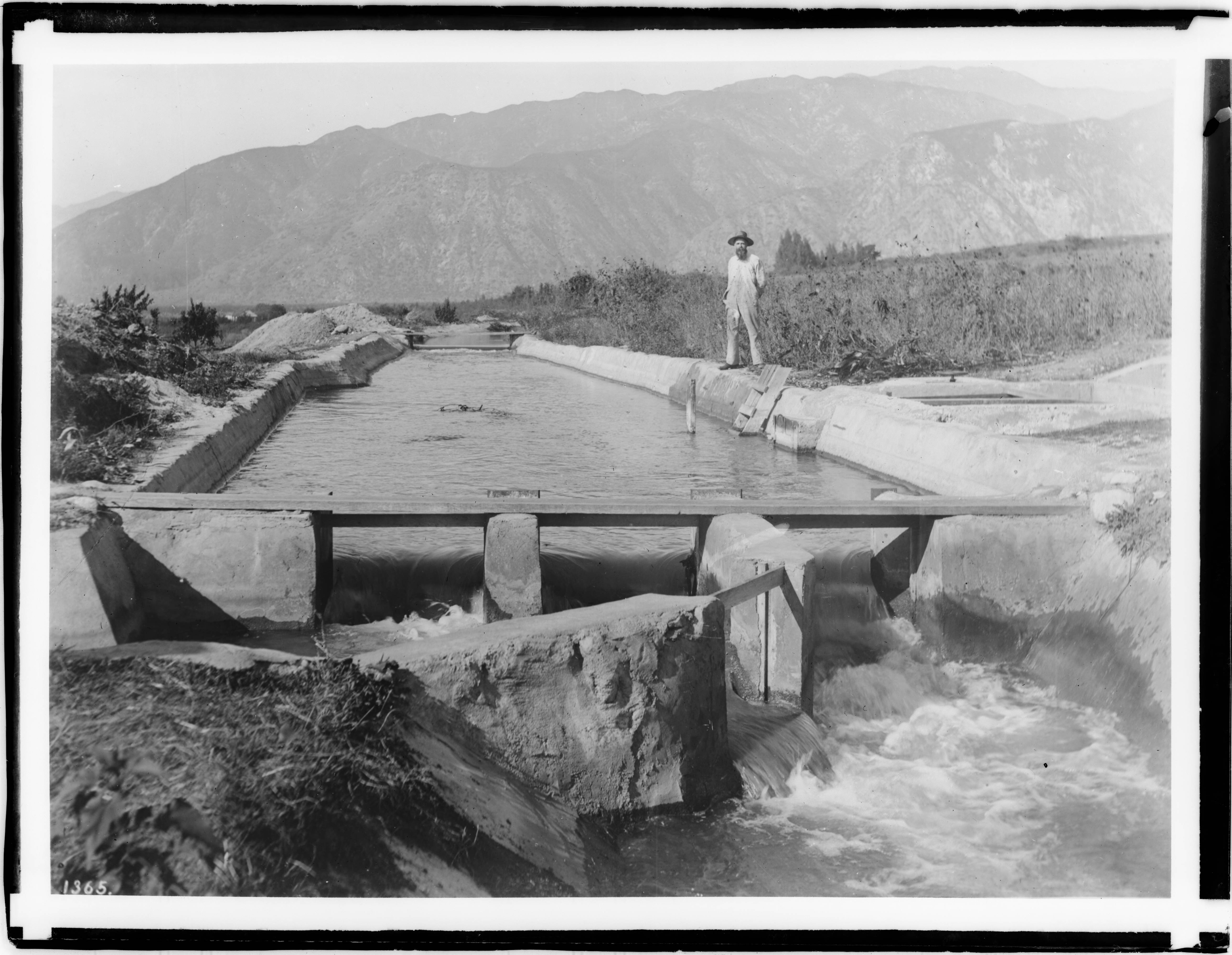
Irrigation ditch in San Gabriel Canyon, ca.1900

Although the Southern California climate is well-suited to most types of agriculture, the seasonality of rainfall made it almost impossible to grow crops without irrigation. After the founding of Mission San Gabriel, the Spanish built and gradually expanded a system of zanjas (canals) and reservoirs to irrigate crops, power mills, and water livestock. The earliest historic record of a water diversion for the mission appears around 1773. Irrigation systems were also built on some of the Mexican ranchos, such as in 1842 when Don Luis Arenas, owner of the Rancho Azusa de Dalton, constructed a zanja from the mouth of San Gabriel River to his homestead, a distance of about one mile (1.6 km). This would later be expanded in to the Azusa Ditch, one of the more important canals of the region.

After California became part of the United States in 1846, the ranching economy gradually shifted towards agriculture (a transition quickened by the Great Flood of 1862 and subsequent drought of 1863-64 which killed almost three-quarters of the livestock in Los Angeles County), and the San Gabriel River became a crucial water source for farms. The California Gold Rush brought a huge influx of people to the state, and the high demand for food transformed the San Gabriel River Basin into one of the nation's most productive agricultural regions. The Southern Pacific Railroad arrived in 1876 and the Union Pacific Railroad in the early 1900s, the latter line passing through the Whittier Narrows; this enabled the San Gabriel River region to become a major exporter of agricultural products.

Some areas had easy access to permanent water, such as the fertile "island meadow" region between the Rio Hondo and San Gabriel Rivers roughly where El Monte is today. This was one of the most popular destinations for early American settlers; for a time it was called "Lexington" (after Lexington, Kentucky, due to the fact that so many people had arrived from that region). However, most areas required irrigation with either surface or well water to make agriculture a possibility. In 1888 the state of California reported that about 14,000 acres (5,700 ha) in the valley were "wet ... and not generally requiring irrigation", while 92,500 acres (37,400 ha) were "highly cultivable and productive lands, but requiring irrigation, at least for some crops."

Flowing through bedrock canyons and fed by winter rain and snow, the East and West Forks of the San Gabriel River carry water all year long. Even in the driest summers, the San Gabriel flowed all the way to the mouth of San Gabriel Canyon near present-day Azusa, where it percolated into the San Gabriel Valley aquifer. Thus, most of the surface water diversions were taken either directly at the mouth of San Gabriel Canyon, or further down near the Whittier Narrows where groundwater rose to the surface once more. In order to supply water during the dry season when surface flows fell to a trickle, a tunnel nearly 800 feet (240 m) long was extended under the river bed to tap the shallow aquifer and supply the Azusa, Duarte, and Beardslee ditches. In 1890, some of the irrigation companies operating on the upper San Gabriel River included the Duarte Mutual Irrigation and Canal Company, the Vineland Irrigation District, and the East Whittier Land and Water Company.

Irrigation soon consumed the entire surface flow of the river below San Gabriel Canyon. As early as 1854, the entire upper San Gabriel River was appropriated, with the Azusa farmers (east of the San Gabriel River) claiming up to two-thirds of the flow and the remaining one-third going to the Duarte farmers, west of the San Gabriel River. Farmers also appropriated essentially all the water emerging from the springs at Whittier Narrows, drying up the river below that point. In 1907, it was reported that the San Gabriel River irrigated some of "the most highly productive citrus regions of Southern California." The Teague Grove in San Dimas, not far from the San Gabriel River, was once one of the largest citrus groves in the world with some 250,000 trees.

Conflict over San Gabriel River water reached a head in the 1880s, when such intense litigation occurred it was called the "Battle of San Gabriel River." This led to the creation of the San Gabriel River Water Committee (Committee of Nine) in 1889 in order to "secure a safe and reliable water supply from the San Gabriel River and to protect the rights to and interests in the river on behalf of committee members." Under the Compromise Agreement of 1889 – which is still in effect today – the Committee of Nine was given the right to administer the distribution of San Gabriel River waters, up to 98,000 acre-feet (121,000,000 m^{3}) per year. All water flows above this amount are administered by the San Gabriel Valley Protective Association.

=== 20th century ===
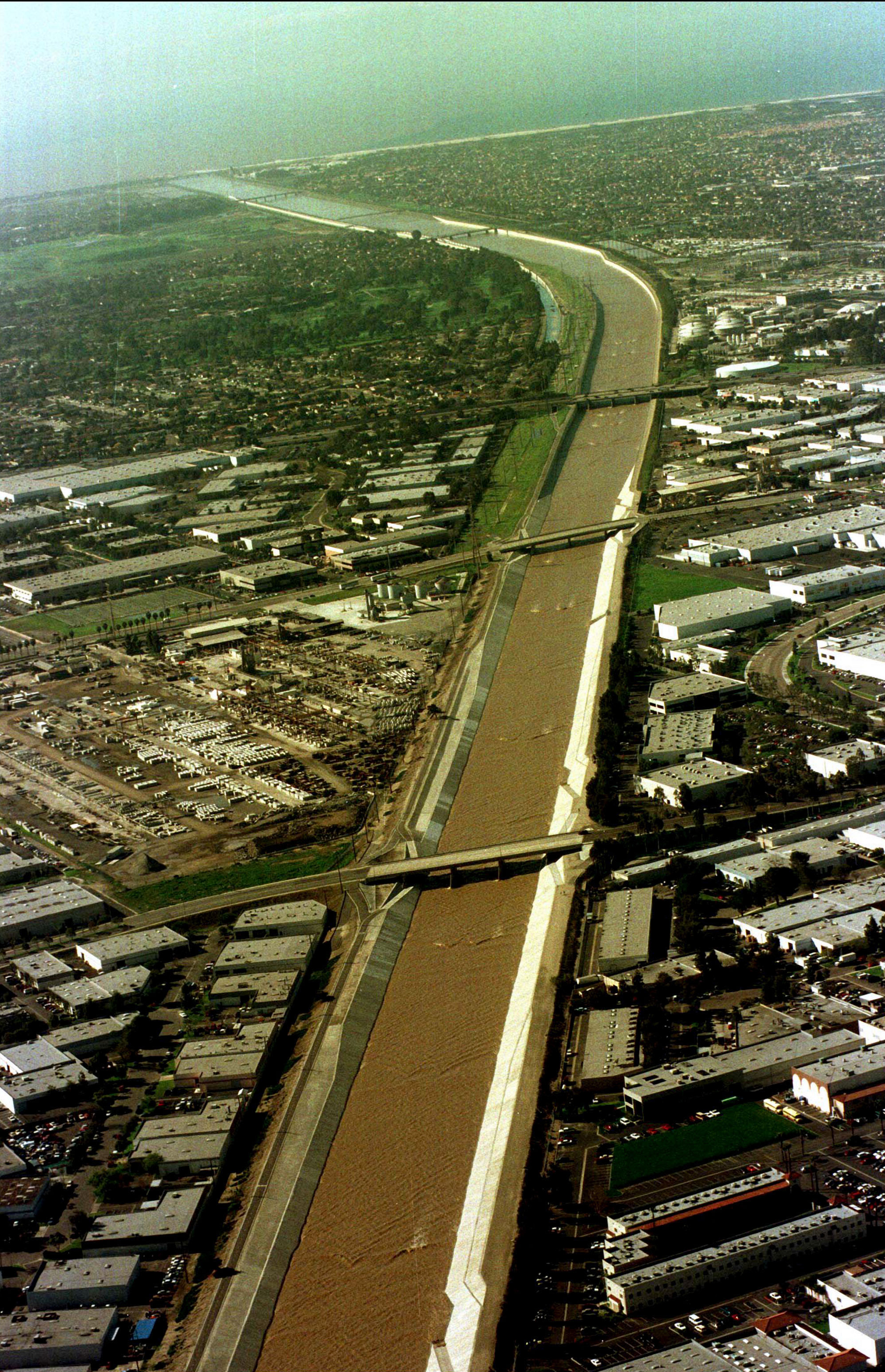
The channelized lower San Gabriel River, near the Pacific Ocean

In the early 1900s, the growing city of Los Angeles began to look to the San Gabriel River for its water supply. However, initial plans were rejected because all the water was already used by farmers, except for floods in the winter. At the time it was believed that the silt-laden, flood-prone San Gabriel River could not be dammed in a safe or efficient manner to conserve this stormwater. In 1913, Los Angeles county engineer Frank Olmstead declared that the cost of a dam on the San Gabriel River would be greater than the economic benefits. When the Los Angeles Aqueduct opened that year, bringing water from the distant Owens Valley, it made possible the urbanization that would eventually replace the vast majority of farmland along the San Gabriel River. During this time, new industries moved into the San Gabriel River area, attracting more urban dwellers to the region. A significant development was the discovery of oil in the Whittier Narrows, reportedly by nine-year-old Tommy Temple in 1912; however, it was not until 1915 that the Standard Oil Company of California sank a well there, and by 1920 almost 100 wells were pumping along the San Gabriel River. The Montebello Oil Field remains a productive oil-producing region today.

The creation of the Pacific Electric interurban railway system in 1911, by a merger of eight local streetcar companies, was a major factor in the growth of new communities along the San Gabriel River, by linking them with downtown Los Angeles. The system was used not only by commuters, but to export agricultural products out of the San Gabriel Valley. A major engineering feat was the Puente Largo ("Great Bridge") built in 1907 to carry the PE Monrovia–Glendora Line over the San Gabriel River. At the time of its construction, it was the largest bridge ever built in southern California.

The San Gabriel River flooded massively in 1914, causing heavy damage to the towns and farms along its course. That year, the Los Angeles County Flood Control Act was passed and the county began a program to build fourteen dams along the San Gabriel River and its tributaries. Bonds totaling about $40 million were issued in 1917 and 1924 to fund the projects, which would be built by the Los Angeles County Flood Control District. A drought in the 1920s furthered the case for the dams, which could also provide water storage for dry years. In 1924, engineer James Reagan proposed the first ambitious dam project for the San Gabriel River:

On 1 April 1924, Reagan offered plans for a twenty-five-million-dollar dam in San Gabriel Canyon ... the flow of the capricious San Gabriel would thus be carefully managed to lessen the flood peaks, even out the seasons, and eliminate the effects of the wet and dry cycles. Not a drop of water would flow to the ocean. 'By this method,' Reagon told the [Los Angeles County] Board of Supervisors, 'it is hoped that water conservation will entirely take the place of flood control.' Against nature's unpredictability, Reagan offered the orderliness of engineering.

The proposed San Gabriel River dam, known as "Forks Dam" or "Twin Forks" due to its location at the river's East and West Forks, was to be 425 feet (130 m) high and 1,700 feet (520 m) wide, with a capacity of 240,000 acre-feet (0.30 km^{3}) of water. It would be the tallest dam in the world, exceeding the 350-foot (110 m) height of Arrowrock Dam. In 1927 a railroad was built 12 miles (19 km) up the San Gabriel Canyon to provide access to the area. Construction of the dam began in December 1928 and quickly progressed in the summer of 1929 with over 600 people working at the site. However, on September 16, 1929, a huge landslide crashed down the canyon wall, partially burying the dam site under 100,000 tons of debris. Although there were no deaths, the state of California later determined that a dam could not be constructed safely at this site, and that adequate geological studies had not been conducted. A subsequent investigation found the supervisors guilty of gross negligence and that "bribery and corruption at the highest level of county government had occurred."

Despite the Forks Dam fiasco, the push to dam the San Gabriel River continued. In April 1934 the county flood control district completed the first dam on the San Gabriel River, the relatively small Cogswell Dam. One month later, the city of Pasadena completed Morris Dam and a pipeline along the San Gabriel foothills, at a cost of $10 million, to deliver San Gabriel River water to its residents. Morris Dam was sold to the flood control district the following year. (The Los Angeles County Flood Control District would eventually be consolidated with the county engineering department and road division to form the Los Angeles County Department of Public Works, which continues to maintain these dams today.)

The largest dam, San Gabriel – two miles (3.2 km) downstream from the original Forks Dam site – was almost complete at the eve of the Los Angeles Flood of 1938, the single most damaging flood in Southern California's history. Storms in late February and early March 1938 dropped a year's worth of rainfall in one week on the San Gabriel Mountains, causing rivers across the Los Angeles Basin to burst their banks, killing over 100 people, and destroying more than $1.3 billion (2016 dollars) worth of property. At the time, the San Gabriel River was the only major river in Southern California with major flood control dams already in place. The new dams reduced a monstrous flood crest of more than 90,000 cubic feet per second (2,500 m^{3}/s) to about 65,700 cubic feet per second (1,860 m^{3}/s), sparing a large part of the San Gabriel Valley from damage. However, heavy damage still occurred in places, especially on the lower San Gabriel River due to flooding from tributaries.

The rate of urbanization increased in the 1930s, in no small part due to Midwestern families fleeing the Dust Bowl and settling in greater Los Angeles. As the population grew and automobiles superseded trains as the main form of transport, the need for additional routes in and out of Los Angeles was recognized. The state of California made several attempts to build a road over the San Gabriel Mountains, via the San Gabriel River from Azusa to Wrightwood. Construction began in 1929 on the East Fork Road which would have traveled through the precipitous gorge of the East Fork of the San Gabriel River. However, the 1938 flood destroyed the road and most of its bridges, except for the Bridge to Nowhere, which remains today as a popular tourist draw.

After World War II, the proposed road took on greater importance for defense, and was envisioned as a potential evacuation route from Los Angeles in the event of a nuclear attack. During the 1950s and 1960s, Shoemaker Canyon Road was partially completed along an alignment higher above the East Fork, but its construction was plagued by mudslides and erosion from winter storms. The second attempt was also abandoned and is now known as the "Road to Nowhere". Finally, the state gave up on the East Fork route and instead chose a route up the North Fork, connecting SR 39 (San Gabriel Canyon Road) to the Angeles Crest Highway at Islip Saddle. However, a massive rock and mudslide in 1978 damaged the roadway, and it has never been reopened, except to emergency vehicles.

==== Camps and resorts ====
As Los Angeles grew in population during the late 19th and early 20th centuries, recreational outings in the San Gabriel Mountains were an increasingly popular pastime (a time known as the "Great Hiking Era" of the San Gabriels). As early as the 1890s local residents recognized the need to preserve mountain areas both as intact watersheds and for recreation. In 1891 the Los Angeles Chamber of Commerce appealed to Congress to have "all public domain included in the watersheds of Los Angeles, San Gabriel and other rivers in the Sierra Range [San Gabriel Mountains] withdrawal [sic] from sale such that the mountains may in future time serve the general public as a great park." In 1892 the San Gabriel Timberland Reserve, precursor to the Angeles National Forest, was established by the federal government.

The canyons, which had become quiet after the departure of gold miners, were busy again in summer with the many resorts established along the forks of the San Gabriel River. Between 1890 and 1938, hiking was "tremendously popular among area residents". One of the major resorts was Camp Bonito, located on the original site of Eldoradoville, "noted for its splendid trout streams, deer range and beautiful surroundings." Camp Bonito was served by stagecoach from the Pacific Electric railroad at Azusa, along the same route taken by the Eldoradoville stage. Other mountain resorts included Cold Brook Camp (in the Crystal Lake area, along the North Fork), and Opids Camp and Camp Rincon along the West Fork. Weber's Camp, located in Coldwater Canyon (a tributary of the East Fork), was a popular stop along the route to the summit of Mount San Antonio, the highest point in the range.

At first, access to the upper San Gabriel River was only possible via hiking or on horseback. The precipitous Mount Lowe Railway opened in 1893, bringing vacationers near the summit of Mount Wilson, high above the West Fork of the San Gabriel River. There a hotel was established, next to the Mount Wilson Observatory; from here pack trails connected to Red Box Saddle, where visitors could descend the West Fork. As automobiles grew in popularity during the early 1900s, roads penetrated deeper into the mountains. The paved road from Azusa up San Gabriel Canyon reached the confluence of the East and West Forks by 1915, making it easier to reach the many camps along the upper San Gabriel.

Although hiking popularity temporarily declined during World War II, recreation increased once more during the postwar population boom, and the upper San Gabriel continues to see heavy use today for hiking, camping, fishing, swimming, and backpacking.

== River modifications and modern uses ==
=== Flood control ===
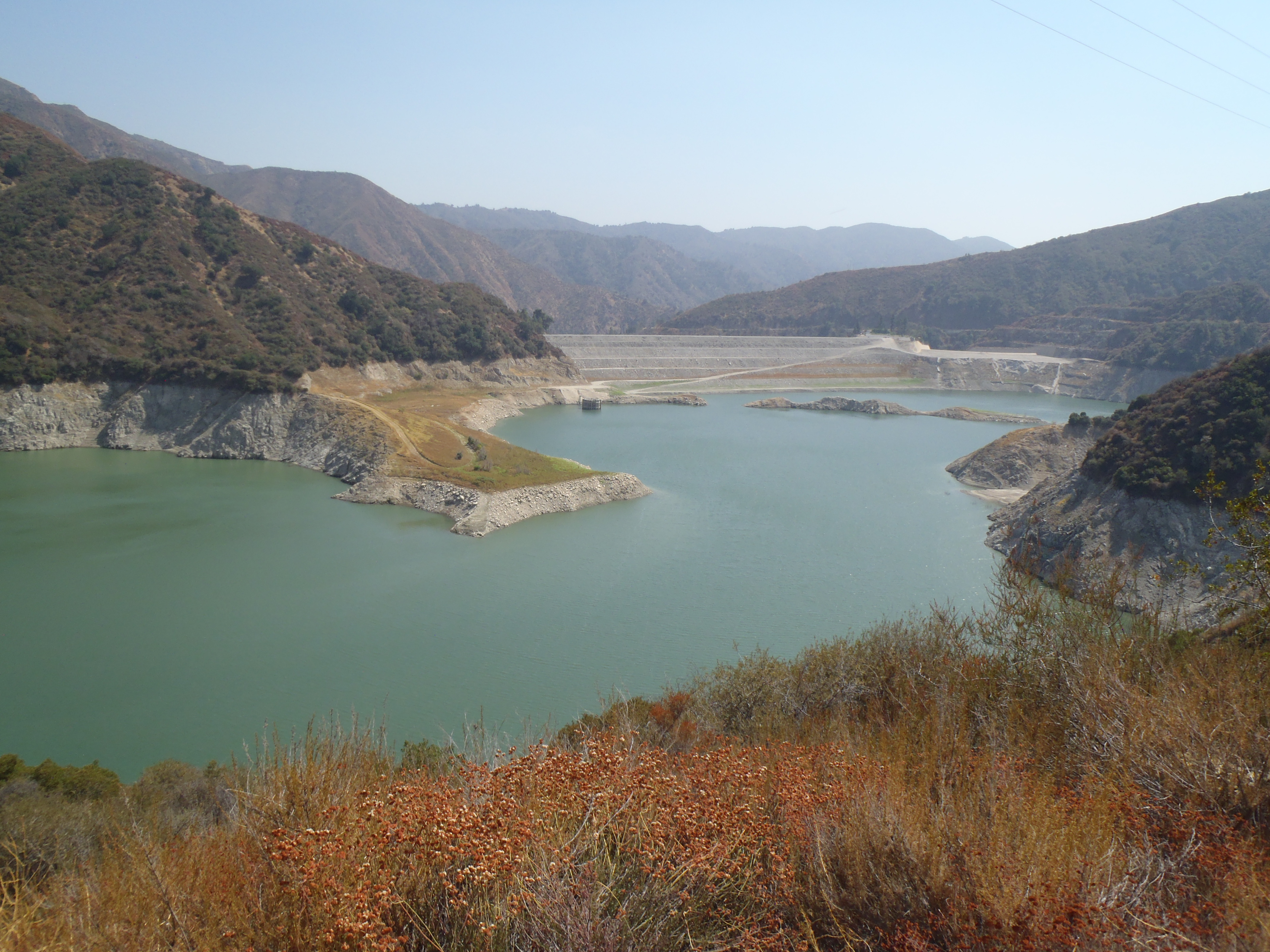
Upstream side of San Gabriel Dam, the largest on the upper San Gabriel River.

Prior to the early 1900s, the San Gabriel River watershed was mostly used for agriculture and ranching; during the river's periodic floods, loss of life and property was limited. The river's changing course below the Whittier Narrows made it difficult to establish permanent settlements there. During most of the 1860s, the San Gabriel River flowed southwest and joined the Los Angeles River to empty into San Pedro Bay. However, a flood in 1868 caused the river to swing into a more southerly course, towards its present mouth at Alamitos Bay, flooding and destroying the town of Gallatin. The old western channel is today's Rio Hondo ("deep river"). The new channel, roughly its present course, was for a time referred to as "New River".

After the flood of 1938, the U.S. Army Corps of Engineers built the two large flood control basins on the lower San Gabriel River – Santa Fe Dam and Whittier Narrows Dam, completed in 1949 and 1957, respectively. Although both dams had already been proposed prior to the 1938 flood, emergency federal funding made available in the Flood Control Act of 1941 were used to expedite their construction. Both dams are dry dams; their combined capacity of 112,000 acre-feet (138,000,000 m^{3}) is used solely for flood control. A second purpose of Santa Fe Dam is to hold back destructive debris flows from the San Gabriel Canyon, as had occurred in 1938. Whittier Narrows Dam can divert excess floodwaters between the San Gabriel River and Rio Hondo as necessary. These supplement the protection provided by the upstream San Gabriel and Cogswell Dams, where the Los Angeles County Department of Public Works maintains a minimum of 50,000 acre-feet (62,000,000 m^{3}) of storage space at the beginning of each winter to protect against flooding.

Another legacy of the 1938 flood was the channelization of Southern California streams, including the San Gabriel River. As a result, nearly the entire lower river has been turned into an artificial channel. However, unlike the nearby Los Angeles River which was almost entirely concreted in the wake of the 1938 flood, only about 10 miles (16 km) of the San Gabriel River channel (between Whittier Narrows Dam and Coyote Creek) are fully concrete. The channel has mostly been constructed to withstand a 100-year flood, and reaches its maximum capacity just above Whittier Narrows at 98,000 cubic feet per second (2,800 m^{3}/s). Below the Whittier Narrows Dam, the channel capacity is just 13,000 cubic feet per second (370 m^{3}/s); most floodwaters are diverted to the Rio Hondo where the channel is much larger and deeper. The capacity of the San Gabriel River near the mouth is approximately 51,000 cubic feet per second (1,400 m^{3}/s).

=== Water supply ===
The San Gabriel River is an important source of water for the 35 incorporated cities and other communities in its watershed; despite the arid climate that requires water be imported from Northern California and the Colorado River, the San Gabriel still provides about a third of the water used locally. The Cogswell, San Gabriel, and Morris dams are operated by the Los Angeles County Department of Public Works (LADPW) and can capture and store up to 85,000 acre-feet (105,000,000 m^{3}) of rain and snow runoff. The Upper San Gabriel Valley Municipal Water District estimates that, in an average year, between 95–99 percent of stormwater runoff from the San Gabriel River system is captured for storage, direct use, or groundwater recharge. The California Department of Water Resources considered the San Gabriel River a "fully appropriated" stream, meaning that no new water rights may be taken.

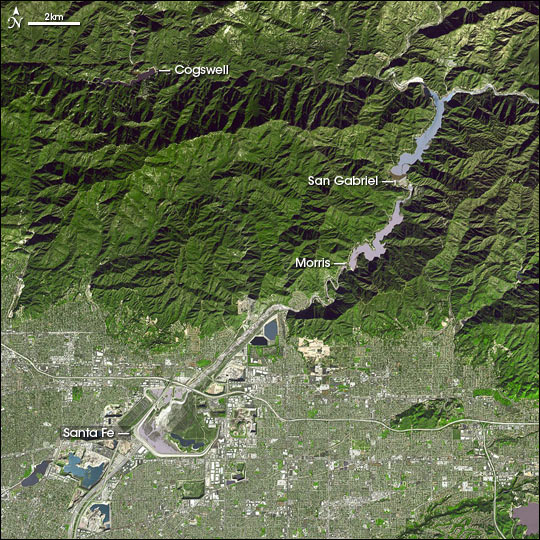
Satellite view of reservoirs on the upper San Gabriel River

Two major groundwater basins or aquifers underlie the San Gabriel River watershed, separated by zones of impermeable bedrock and fault lines. Groundwater acts as the main long-term water storage of the San Gabriel River system, since the aquifers can hold many times more water than surface reservoirs. The San Gabriel Valley Basin covers a total of 255 square miles (660 km^{2}) and has a storage capacity of 10.8 million acre-feet (13.3 km^{3}) of groundwater. The Central Basin is somewhat larger, with an area of 277 square miles (720 km^{2}) and a storage capacity of 13.8 million acre-feet (17.0 km^{3}). Soil permeability, and thus natural groundwater recharge rates, is much higher in the San Gabriel Valley than in the Central Basin. Although both groundwater basins experience some overdraft, the deficit is more severe in the Central Basin.

The LADPW operates an extensive series of spreading grounds which receive water from the San Gabriel River and allow it to percolate back into the regional aquifers. Due to the limited speed at which the ground can absorb water, the spreading grounds must be operated in tandem with surface reservoirs, which can capture big stormwater surges in winter and release water gradually through the dry season. The combined San Gabriel / Rio Hondo system is served by seven spreading grounds – San Gabriel Canyon, Santa Fe, Peck Road, San Gabriel Valley, Rio Hondo Coastal, San Gabriel Coastal, and Montebello Forebay – totaling 1,862 acres (754 ha). The first three contribute to the San Gabriel Valley aquifer and recharge about 220,000 acre-feet (270,000,000 m^{3}) each year. The others are used to recharge the Central Basin (coastal) aquifer and conserve an average of 150,000 acre-feet (190,000,000 m^{3}) per year. In addition, rubber dams can be inflated along certain stretches of the San Gabriel River to slow the flow rate and allow water to percolate directly through the river bed.

Water distribution in the San Gabriel Valley is adjudicated by the Main San Gabriel Basin Watermaster, a board which determines the amount of water to be delivered to each user (mostly municipal water agencies), recharged into the aquifer, and pumped from the aquifer. The "operating safe yield" is the amount of groundwater that can be reliably extracted from the aquifer and is determined by the Watermaster based on annual rainfall and runoff. Between 1973 and 2002, this averaged approximately 200,000 acre-feet (250,000,000 m^{3}). The Central Basin Watermaster serves the same purpose for the Central Basin aquifer and allows pumping of roughly 217,000 acre-feet (268,000,000 m^{3}) per year. The Puente Subbasin is located between the Puente and San Jose Hills (roughly between City of Industry and Diamond Bar) and, although hydrologically part of the San Gabriel Valley aquifer, is managed as a separate entity.

=== Hydroelectricity ===
There is one hydroelectric plant on the river, located just to the north of Azusa. The original Azusa Hydroelectric Plant was built in 1898 by the San Gabriel Electric Company (which in 1917 was incorporated into Southern California Edison). Power generation began on June 30, with an initial capacity of 2,000 kilowatts (KW). During the early 1900s, it was mainly used to power the Pacific Electric (Red Car) and Los Angeles Railway (Yellow Car) systems in the greater Los Angeles area. The plant was purchased by the City of Pasadena in 1930, due to structural modifications needed to accommodate the city's proposed Morris Dam. A new 3,000 KW plant was built adjacent to the old plant in the 1940s.

The power station is supplied with water via the 5.5-mile-long (8.9 km) Azusa Conduit, which draws water from the river below San Gabriel Dam, and runs along the east wall of the San Gabriel Canyon to a point just north of Azusa adjacent to the San Gabriel Canyon spreading grounds, where a 38-inch-diameter (970 mm) penstock falls 390 feet (120 m) down the mountainside to the powerhouse. Between 1996 and 2014, the plant generated an annual average of 4 million kilowatt hours. The usage of river water for electricity production has been controversial, as diverting water can dry up the channel, reducing fish habitat.

=== Sand and gravel mining ===
Although not directly related to water supply, the San Gabriel River bed – filled with coarse and fine sediments to depths of hundreds and sometimes thousands of feet – is an important source of aggregate materials (gravel and sand) for use in construction. The San Gabriel Valley around Irwindale is one of the largest aggregate mining areas in the United States – more than a billion tons have been taken from the old river bed, supplying construction projects all over Los Angeles County. Most of the freeway system in greater Los Angeles was built using aggregate from the San Gabriel river bed.

In Irwindale, there are seventeen gravel pits of various sizes, although not all are being mined. The largest aggregate company operating in the San Gabriel river is Vulcan Materials Company. There are proposals to refill some of the inactive pits to allow commercial, retail, and industrial development, or repurpose them as parks or water storage reservoirs. The maximum allowed depth is 200 feet (61 m), and since many pits have already reached this depth, mining companies are pushing to extend the limit by another 150 feet (46 m). This has been controversial due to the risk of slope instability.

Another major area of sediment removal is from the reservoirs along the San Gabriel River. The San Gabriel River drains one of the most erosive mountain ranges in the world, and mountain reservoirs must be continually dredged to maintain enough space for flood control. Between 1935 and 2013, about 42,000,000 cubic yards (32,000,000 m^{3}) of sediment have been removed from Cogswell and San Gabriel Reservoirs, equal to about 40 percent of the total original design volume of the reservoirs. Most of this material is unsuitable for use as aggregate and must be disposed of in designated sediment placement sites. It has been proposed to truck reservoir mud to Irwindale to fill some of the abandoned gravel quarries there.

=== Water quality issues ===
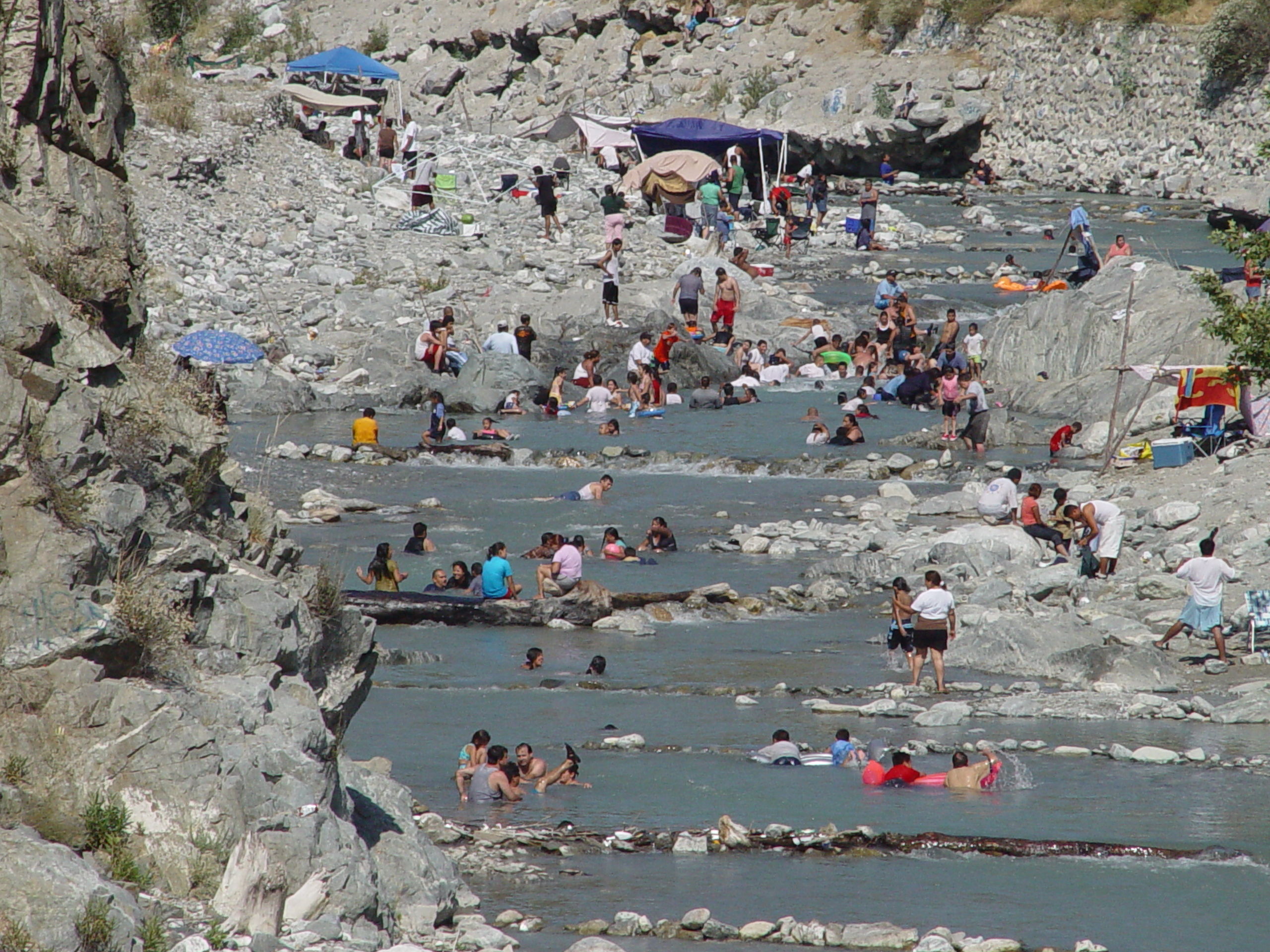
The East Fork is one of the most heavily used recreation areas in the entire National Forest system, as seen here. The river has suffered from trash and pollution as a result.

Since more than half the watershed is developed, the San Gabriel River receives large amounts of industrial and urban runoff that contribute to pollution in the lower river. In addition, several major wastewater treatment plants discharge effluent to the river, the largest being the Los Coyotes plant, which has an output of 30 million gallons (110,000 m^{3}) per day. A total of 598 businesses, manufacturers, and other parties are licensed to discharge storm water into the San Gabriel River, and more than 100 storm drains empty directly into the river. The upper reaches of the river, although undeveloped, are subjected to heavy recreational use and are impacted by trash, debris, fecal coliforms, and heavy metals. The U.S. Forest Service removes about four hundred 32-gallon bags of trash from the East Fork each weekend.

A 2007 study found that Coyote Creek, the main tributary of the lower San Gabriel River, exhibited "acute and chronic toxicity" from pesticides and industrial chemicals, while toxicity levels in the main stem San Gabriel River, Walnut Creek, and San Jose Creek were "significantly reduced" from 1995 levels due to improved water treatment systems. The Alamitos and Haynes generating stations are located on the lower San Gabriel River and discharge their cooling water into the river. This has had adverse impacts on habitat surrounding the river's estuary. A considerable portion of the groundwater in the San Gabriel River watershed is also polluted, mostly from industrial chemicals. The San Gabriel Valley has four Superfund sites where water is being extracted for treatment before being pumped back into the ground.

== Crossings ==
From mouth to source (year built in parentheses):

- Marina Drive (1963)
- SR 1 - Pacific Coast Highway (1931)
- Second Street - twin bridges (1964)
- SR 22 - East 7th Street - twin bridges (1941, 1959)
- College Park Drive (1964)
- Southbound Interstate 605 ramp to northbound Interstate 405 (1966)
- I-405 - San Diego Freeway (1964)
- Southbound Interstate 405 ramp to northbound Interstate 605 (1966)
- East Willow Street (1962)
- East Spring Street (1952)
- East Wardlow Road (1963)
- San Gabriel River Bicycle Path [bike bridge]
- Carson Street - twin bridges (1971)
- Del Amo Boulevard (1966)
- South Street (1952)
- 183rd Street (1972)
- Artesia Boulevard (1941)
- Railroad (West Santa Ana Branch, disused)
- SR 91 - Artesia Freeway (1968)
- [Pedestrian Bridge]
- Alondra Boulevard (1952)
- Rosecrans Avenue (1951)
- Foster Road [Pedestrian Bridge]
- Eastbound Interstate 105 ramps to Interstate 605 (1987)
- I-105 - Glenn Anderson Freeway and Metro C Line (1987)
- Interstate 605 ramps to westbound Interstate 105 (1987)
- Imperial Highway (1952)
- Railroad (Union Pacific)
- Firestone Boulevard (1934)
- Florence Avenue (1951)
- I-5 - Santa Ana Freeway (1953)
- Telegraph Road (1937)
- Railroad (Union Pacific)
- Slauson Avenue (1958)
- Railroad (BNSF/Amtrak Pacific Surfliner and Southwest Chief/Metrolink Orange County Line and 91/Perris Valley Line)
- Washington Boulevard (1953)
- SR 72 - Whittier Boulevard (1968)
- Railroad (Union Pacific and Metrolink Riverside Line)
- East Beverly Boulevard (1952)
- San Gabriel River Parkway (1954)
- Whittier Narrows Dam
- Peck Road - twin bridges (1952)
- SR 60 - Pomona Freeway (1967)
- Valley Boulevard (1916)
- Railroad (Union Pacific/Amtrak Sunset Limited/Metrolink San Bernardino Line)
- I-10 - San Bernardino Freeway (westbound 1933, eastbound 1956)
- Ramona Boulevard (1961)
- Lower Azusa Road (1960)
- I-605 - San Gabriel River Freeway - twin bridges (1970)
- Live Oak Avenue (1961)
- Arrow Highway (1949)
- Santa Fe Dam
- Railroad (Metro A Line)
- I-210 - Foothill Freeway (1968)
- Foothill Boulevard/Huntington Drive (1922)
- [Pedestrian Bridge]
- Mountain Laurel Way
- Rock Springs Way
- SR 39 - San Gabriel Canyon Road (1933)
- Morris Reservoir
- San Gabriel Reservoir

=== East Fork ===
- Forest Route 2N16/Upper Monroe Rd to Fire Camp 19
- East Fork Road (1936)
- Bridge to Nowhere (1936)

=== North Fork ===
- SR 39 (1967)
- SR 39 (1967)
- SR 39 (1932)

=== West Fork ===
- East Fork Road (1949)
- State Route 39 (1962)

== See also ==
- Council for Watershed Health
- Gabrielino Trail
- List of rivers of California
- List of rivers of Orange County, California
- List of most-polluted rivers
- San Gabriel Mountains National Monument
- List of Los Angeles bike paths

== Works cited ==
- Cornejo, Jeffrey Lawrence (2007). Azusa. Arcadia Publishing. ISBN 978-0-73854-710-7.
- Green, Dorothy (2007). Managing Water: Avoiding Crisis in California. University of California Press. ISBN 978-0-52094-122-9.
- Guinn, James Miller (1902). Historical and Biographical Record of Southern California: Containing a History of Southern California from Its Earliest Settlement to the Opening Year of the Twentieth Century. Chapman Publishing Company.
- Hall, W.M. Ham; et al. (1888). Irrigation in Southern California: The Field, Water-Supply and Works, Organization and Operation in San Diego, San Bernardino and Los Angeles Counties. J.D. Young.
- McGroarty, John Steven; et al. (1914). Southern California: Comprising the Counties of Imperial, Los Angeles, Orange, Riverside, San Bernardino, San Diego, Ventura. Southern California Panama Expositions Commission.
- Newell, F.H. (1894). Report on Agriculture by Irrigation in the Western Part of the United States at the Eleventh Census: 1890. Government Printing Office.
- Orsi, Jared (2004). Hazardous Metropolis: Flooding and Urban Ecology in Los Angeles. University of California Press. ISBN 0-52093-008-8.
- Robinson, John W.; Christiansen, Doug (2013). Trails of the Angeles: 100 Hikes in the San Gabriels. Wilderness Press. ISBN 978-0-89997-715-7.
- Schad, Jerry (2010). Afoot and Afield: Los Angeles County: A Comprehensive Hiking Guide. Wilderness Press. ISBN 978-0-89997-639-6.
- Strawther, Larry (2012). A Brief History of Los Alamitos-Rossmoor. Arcadia Publishing. ISBN 978-1-61423-774-7.
- Temple, Josette Laura; Brundige, Laura W. (2004). Gentle Artist of the San Gabriel Valley: California History Preserved Through the Life and Painting of Walter P. Temple, Jr. Stephens Press. ISBN 1-93217-331-5.
- U.S. National Park Service (September 2011). "San Gabriel Watershed and Mountains Special Resource Study and Environmental Assessment" (PDF). National Park Service History eLibrary.
- Waldman, Carl (2014). Encyclopedia of Native American Tribes. Infobase Publishing. ISBN 978-1-43811-010-3.
