= Red Box, California =

Unincorporated community in California, United States

Coordinates: 34°15′30.5″N 118°06′18.8″W

Location of Red Box within Greater Los Angeles.

Red Box is the name of the junction of the Angeles Crest Highway, the Mt. Wilson-Red Box Road, and the Rincon-Red Box Road in Los Angeles County, California, United States. It is located at the 1,422-meter (4,665 ft) saddle between Mount Lawlor and San Gabriel Peak. The saddle separates the upper Arroyo Seco drainage from the West Fork of the San Gabriel River.

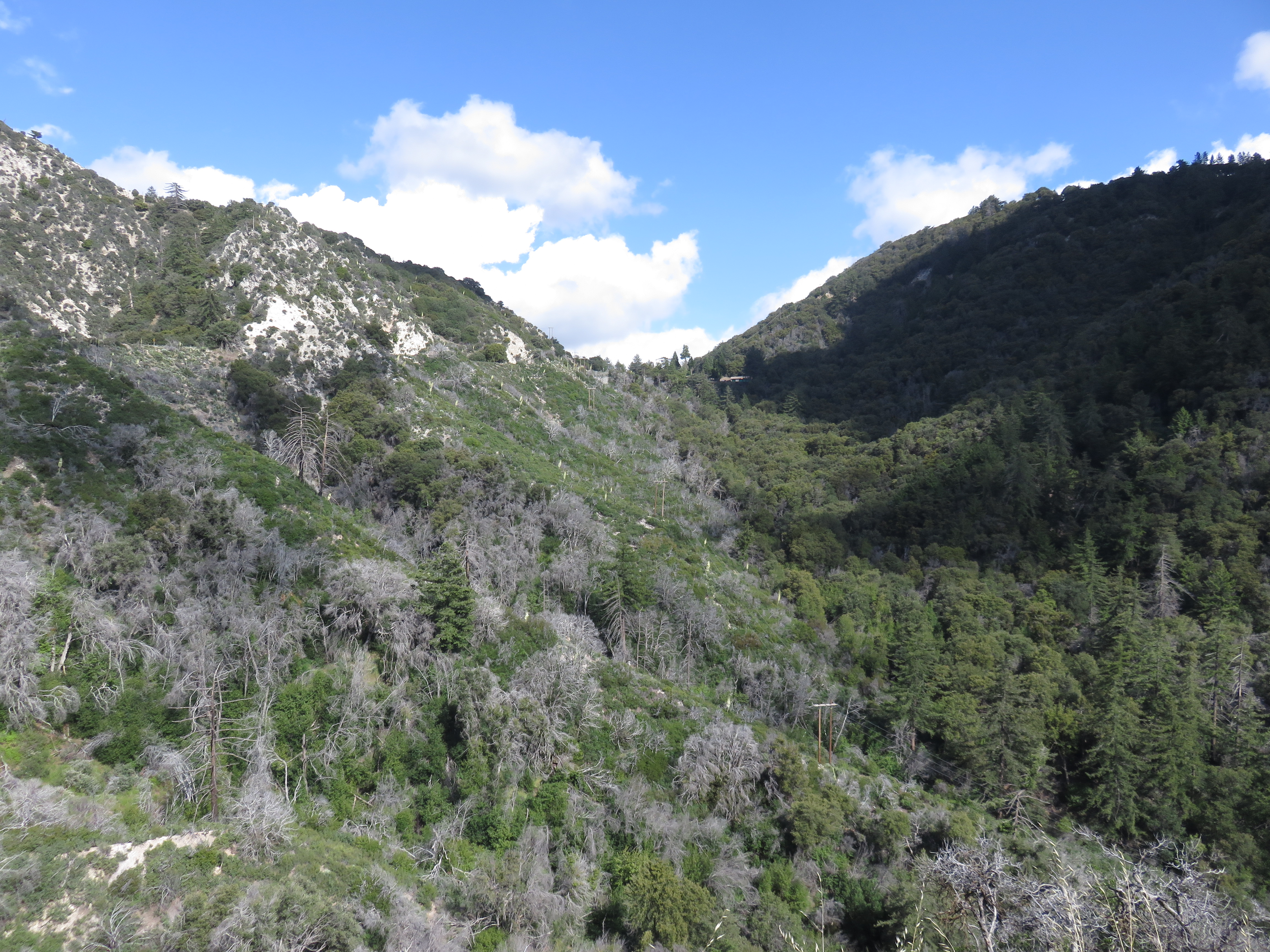
Red Box Saddle viewed from the east in 2019
