= Cogswell Dam =

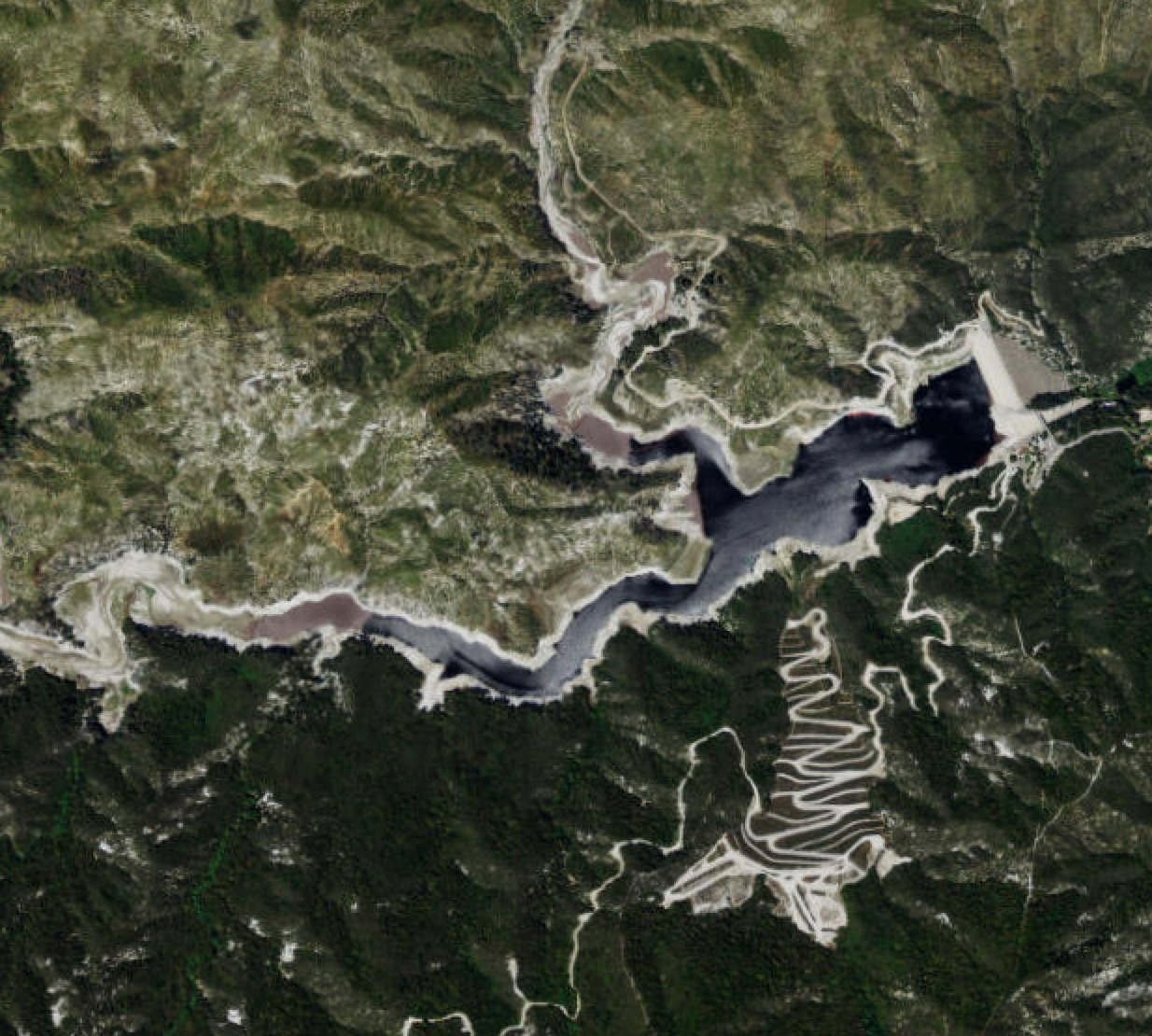
- Satellite view

- Location within California
- Country: United States
- Location: San Gabriel Mountains, Angeles National Forest, Los Angeles County, California
- Coordinates: 34°14′41″N 117°57′55″W
- Opening date: 1935; 91 years ago
- Owner: Los Angeles County Department of Public Works

Dam and spillways
- Type of dam: Rock-filled
- Impounds: West Fork San Gabriel River
- Height: 266 ft (81 m)
- Height (foundation): 280 ft (85 m)
- Length: 585 ft (178 m)
- Spillway capacity: 59,900 cu ft/s (1,700 m^{3}/s)

Reservoir
- Creates: Cogswell Reservoir
- Total capacity: 12,234 acre⋅ft (15,090,000 m^{3})
- Catchment area: 38.4 mi^{2} (99 km^{2})
- Surface area: 146 acres (59 ha)

Cogswell Dam is a rockfill dam on the West Fork of the San Gabriel River in Los Angeles County, California. It is located in the San Gabriel Mountains, northeast of Mount Wilson, and within the Angeles National Forest.

It forms Cogswell Reservoir, which has a capacity of 8,969 acre-feet (11,063,000 m^{3}).

The dam serves mainly for flood control in conjunction with San Gabriel Dam and Morris Dam downstream. San Gabriel Dam lies 13 miles (21 km) downstream.

== Construction ==
Bonds for the dam's construction were issued in 1924. Construction began in March 1932 and was completed in April 1934, at a total cost of US$3,127,762.

The rock-fill dam, built by the Los Angeles County Flood Control District, is 585 feet (178 m) long, 266 feet (81 m) tall (measured from the stream bed), 18 feet (5.5 m) wide at the top, and contains 1,044,945 cubic yards (798,918 m^{3}) of material. Its crest is 2,412 feet (735 m) above sea level and 27 feet (8.2 m) above the certified water storage elevation.

The dam rests on crystalline granite bedrock. The buttress is 750 feet (230 m) thick at the base, and the height from foundation to crest is 285 feet (87 m). There are concrete cutoff walls and a concrete facing slab on the dam's upstream side.

== See also ==
- List of dams and reservoirs in California
- San Gabriel Mountains topics
- San Gabriel River topics
