= Eldoradoville, California =

Eldoradoville
- Former settlement
- Location in Los Angeles County
- Coordinates: 34.2297°N 117.7698°W
- Country: United States
- State: California
- County: Los Angeles County
- Established: 1859
- Washed away: 1862

Eldoradoville was a gold mining town in Los Angeles County, located in the San Gabriel Mountains. Established in 1859, after gold had been discovered in the river in 1855, Eldoradoville at its peak population had three stores and six saloons. It was washed away on January 18, 1862, in the Great Flood of 1862. One historian described it as "the Downieville of the south—a rough and tough miner's town."

The site of Eldoradoville is on the East Fork of the San Gabriel River, on the north side of East Fork Road, where the Eldoradoville Campground is located at an elevation of 1,866 feet (569 m).

== See also ==
- List of ghost towns in California
