= Iron Mountain (Los Angeles County) =

Mountain in Los Angeles County, California

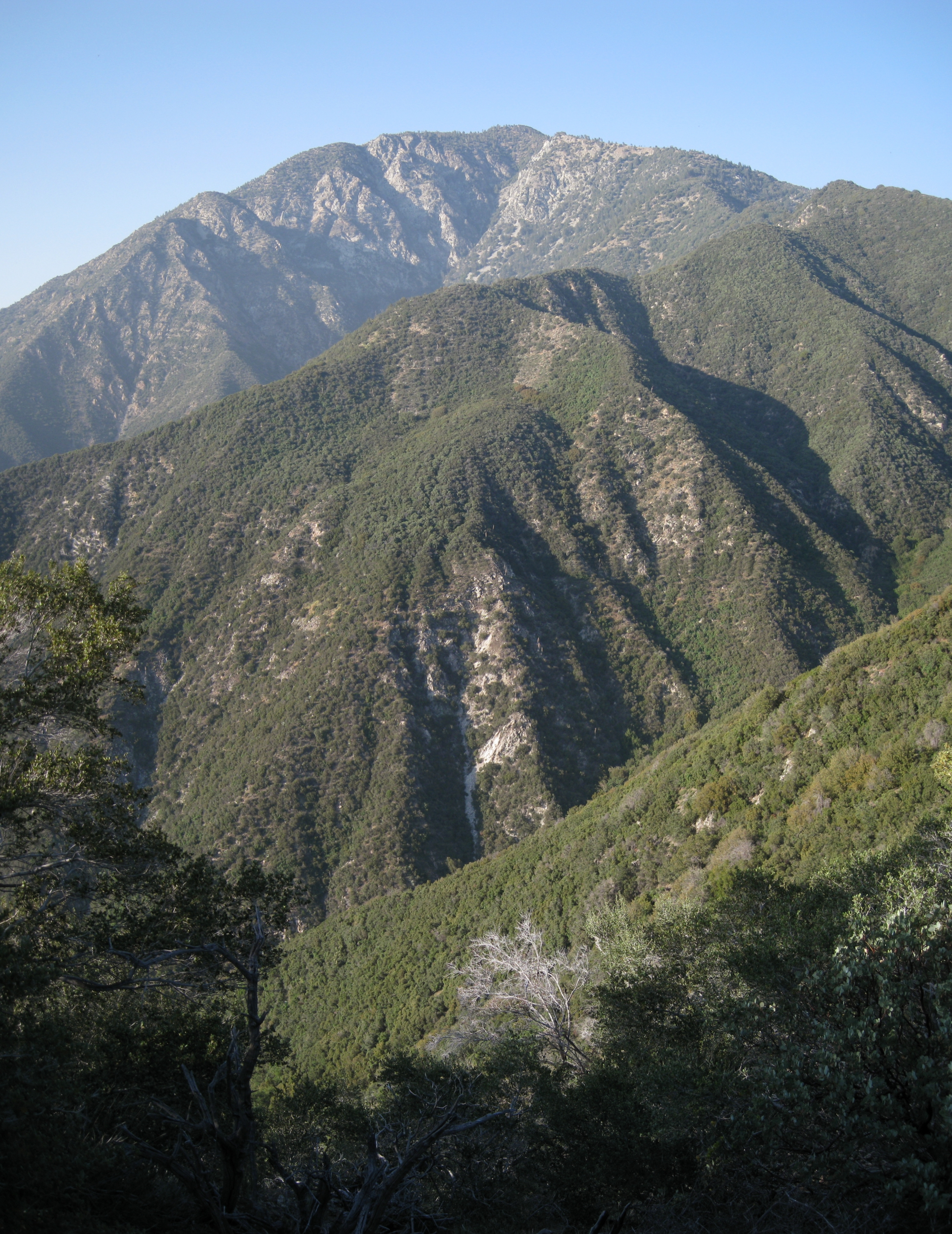
- Iron Mountain seen from above the East Fork, San Gabriel River

Highest point
- Elevation: 8,010 ft (2,441 m) NAVD 88
- Prominence: 687 ft (209 m)
- Listing: Hundred Peaks Section
- Coordinates: 34°17′18″N 117°42′46″W

Geography
- Location within California Location within the United States
- Location: Los Angeles County, California, U.S.
- Parent range: San Gabriel Mountains
- Topo map: USGS Mount San Antonio

Climbing
- Easiest route: Very strenuous hike, class 1

Iron Mountain is a mountain in the San Gabriel Mountains of Los Angeles County, California. It is within the San Gabriel Mountains National Monument, in the section managed by the Angeles National Forest.

== Names ==
The 8,007 ft (2,441 m) peak is sometimes referenced as Iron Mountain #1 or Big Iron, was originally called Sheep Mountain by the early miners in San Gabriel Canyon because of the large bands of bighorn sheep that roamed the slopes. The United States Geological Survey, which mapped the San Gabriel Mountains in the 1890s, ignored the local Sheep Mountain designation and gave it its present name. According to Will Thrall, there was once a USFS plan to change the name back to Sheep Mountain in 1940.

The mountain is in the federally designated Sheep Mountain Wilderness, a reference to the mountain's original name.

== Access ==
While this mountain is far lower in elevation than other Southern California summits, it is the most difficult mountain to climb in the entire region. There are no water sources on the mountain, unless one finds snow. There are no maintained trails, the summit is seldom visited, and the climb is of about 6000 vertical feet (1,800 m), much of it at a 30° to 50° angle on loose soil, decomposed rock, or through brush. Some approaches to the summit require high degrees of rock-climbing skill. One route over the ridgeline from nearby Mount San Antonio (Mount Baldy) is long, difficult, and dangerous. The south mountain slopes in summer are directly exposed to the sun. Some climbers stay at the ruins of the Allison Mine about 3,900 feet (1,200 m) below the summit. There are no facilities of any kind on the mountain.

=== Climbing statistics ===
- Distance: 14 mi (23 km) round trip on trail and cross-country
- Gain: 7,200 ft (2,200 m) total, 6,600 ft (2,000 m) out plus 600 ft (180 m) on return
- Time: 10 to 12 hours round trip
- Rating: class 1 but very strenuous

== See also ==
- San Gabriel Mountains National Monument−related topics
