= Council for Watershed Health =

U.S. nonprofit environmental organization

- Founder: Dorothy Green
- Legal status: 501(c) organization
- Region served: Southern California
- Official language: English
- Website: www.watershedhealth.org
- Formerly called: Los Angeles & San Gabriel Rivers Watershed Council

The Council for Watershed Health (CWH) is a nonprofit environmental organization in the U.S. state of California. It was founded in 1996 by Dorothy Green to preserve, restore, and enhance the Los Angeles and San Gabriel River watersheds. To accomplish this, it has brought together representatives from the regional water agencies (supply, groundwater, stormwater, water quality, and wastewater), as well as government regulatory agencies (federal to local); community and environmental citizen groups; and businesses in the Los Angeles Basin watershed.

The organization was originally called the Los Angeles & San Gabriel Rivers Watershed Council.

== Organization ==
=== Board ===
The Watershed Council's Board consists of individuals representing state, regional, and local government; business; landowners (state conservancies); water and wastewater agencies; and non-profit community and environmental organizations. The board includes: the Los Angeles Department of Water and Power, Metropolitan Water District of Southern California, Southern California Edison, the Southern California Building Industry Association, Bank of America Merrill Lynch, WSP|Parsons Brinckerhoff, The Resources Legacy Fund, San Gabriel Mountains Forever, Los Angeles Bureau of Sanitation, and the County of Los Angeles.

=== Funding ===
Major sources of funding for the Watershed Council include the Metropolitan Water District of Southern California, County of Los Angeles Flood Control District, City of Los Angeles Bureau of Sanitation, Sanitation Districts of Los Angeles County, United States Bureau of Reclamation, California Department of Conservation, California Department of Water Resources, Rivers and Mountains Conservancy, the California Coastal Conservancy, and the Annenberg Foundation.

== Programs ==
The goals of CWH programs are to improve and expand local water supplies and reduce per capita water demand in the greater Los Angeles region; to increase the number of people, municipalities, and businesses that adopt and implement sustainable and water-efficient urban landscapes; and to provide science-based research to better understand trends and indicators related to the health of our watersheds and communities to improve watershed health.

=== Healthy Streams for Angelenos ===
The Healthy Streams for Angelenos program monitors and researches watershed health, and works toward watershed habitat restoration.

=== Living laboratories ===
CWH works with water agencies and local community partners to develop "living laboratories": green streets, alleys, schoolyards and parks that build community capacity in local water sustainability and stewardship. Living laboratories help to determine how individual projects impact water quality, water supply, public health, and safety.

The CWH's five "living laboratories" are:

- Elmer Avenune Neighborhood Retrofit and Elmer Paseo Green Alley, a partnership with Los Angeles County and City of Los Angeles
- Avalon Green Alleys, a partnership with City of Los Angeles and Trust for Public Land
- Glenoaks Greenway, in partnership with City of Los Angeles and Los Angeles City Council District 2
- Partnership with Los Angeles Unified School District (LAUSD) for the Drought Response Outreach Programs for Schools (DROPS)
- Marsh Park, a partnership with Mountains Recreation and Conservation Authority

=== Watershed coordination and research planning ===
Among the CWH's activities and relationships are:

- The Water Augmentation Study (WAS) and WAS Technical Advisory Committee
- Los Angeles River Watershed Monitoring Program
- Disadvantaged Communities Outreach Evaluation Project
- Vice-chair of the Upper Los Angeles River Subregion Committee
- Membership in the Lower San Gabriel and Los Angeles and Los Angeles Rivers Subregion Committee
- Membership in the AB 530 Lower River Working Group
- Water Foundation Community Tool Kit
- Educational symposia and seminars
- Publication of WatershedWise, a quarterly periodical

== See also ==
- Index: Rivers and streams of Los Angeles County
