= Elizabeth Lake, California =

- Unincorporated community Census designated place
- Location in Los Angeles County, California

- Location in California Location in the United States
- Coordinates: 34°39′23″N 118°22′46″W
- Country: United States
- State: California
- County: Los Angeles

Area
  - Total: 6.500 sq mi (16.835 km^{2})
  - Land: 6.203 sq mi (16.066 km^{2})
  - Water: 0.297 sq mi (0.769 km^{2}) 4.57%
- Elevation: 3,389 ft (1,033 m)

Population (2020)
  - Total: 1,651
  - Density: 266.2/sq mi (102.8/km^{2})
- Time zone: UTC-8 (Pacific (PST))
  - Summer (DST): UTC-7 (PDT)
- ZIP Code: 93532
- GNIS feature ID: 2583006
- FIPS code: 06-21964

Elizabeth Lake is a census-designated place (CDP) and unincorporated community on Elizabeth Lake, in Los Angeles County, California, United States. As of the 2020 census it had a population of 1,651.

== Geography ==
The community of Elizabeth Lake borders the unincorporated community of Lake Hughes, sharing the same ZIP Code (93532). It is located in the northern Sierra Pelona Mountains, at the edge of the western Antelope Valley and Mojave Desert. The community is at an elevation of 3,389 feet (1,033 m) and surrounded by the Angeles National Forest.

Elizabeth Lake and Hughes Lake are in canyons along the San Andreas Fault. Both lakes dry up periodically depending on rainfall cycles.

According to the United States Census Bureau, the CDP has a total area of 6.5 square miles (16.8 km^{2}), over 95% of which is land.

== History ==
Known then as "La Laguna de Chico Lopez", Elizabeth Lake was a watering locale on Spanish colonial and Mexican El Camino Viejo in Alta California and the Gold Rush era Stockton–Los Angeles Road. From 1858 to 1861 it was between the Widow Smith's Station and Mud Spring stage stops of the Butterfield Overland Mail. The lake area was to the west of Rancho La Liebre, an 1846 Mexican land grant now part of Tejon Ranch.

In 1907 William Mulholland, superintendent of the Los Angeles Department of Water and Power, started work on the Elizabeth Tunnel for transporting water in the Los Angeles Aqueduct from Owens Valley to Los Angeles. The 5-mile-long (8 km) tunnel is 285 feet (87 m) under the valley floor. The tunnel was driven from both ends. The north portal is at Fairmont Reservoir and the south in Bear Canyon (now Portal Canyon) northwest of Green Valley. This 11-foot-wide (3.4 m) tunnel was driven 27,000 ft (8,200 m) through solid rock and met in the center within 1½ inches in line and 5/8 inches in depth. Work was around the clock and averaged about 11 feet (3.4 m) per day. The Elizabeth Lake tunnel was the largest single construction project on the Los Angeles Aqueduct and set speed records in its day.

== Demographics ==
Historical population
Census	Pop.	Note	%±
2010	1,756		—
2020	1,651		−6.0%
U.S. Decennial Census; 2000 2010; 2020

Elizabeth Lake first appeared as a census designated place in the 2010 U.S. census.

=== Racial and ethnic composition ===
Elizabeth Lake CDP, California – Racial and ethnic composition Note: the US Census treats Hispanic/Latino as an ethnic category. This table excludes Latinos from the racial categories and assigns them to a separate category. Hispanics/Latinos may be of any race.
Race / Ethnicity (NH = Non-Hispanic)	Pop 2010	Pop 2020	% 2010	% 2020
White alone (NH)	1,426	1,166	81.21%	70.62%
Black or African American alone (NH)	21	20	1.20%	1.21%
Native American or Alaska Native alone (NH)	3	9	0.17%	0.55%
Asian alone (NH)	23	25	1.31%	1.51%
Native Hawaiian or Pacific Islander alone (NH)	1	0	0.06%	0.00%
Other race alone (NH)	0	5	0.00%	0.30%
Mixed race or Multiracial (NH)	51	87	2.90%	5.27%
Hispanic or Latino (any race)	231	339	13.15%	20.53%
Total	1,756	1,651	100.00%	100.00%

=== 2020 census ===
As of the 2020 census, Elizabeth Lake had a population of 1,651 and a population density of 266.2 inhabitants per square mile (102.8/km^{2}). The whole population lived in households. 0.0% of residents lived in urban areas, while 100.0% lived in rural areas.

There were 693 households, out of which 193 (27.8%) had children under the age of 18 living in them, 346 (49.9%) were married-couple households, 46 (6.6%) were cohabiting couple households, 151 (21.8%) had a female householder with no partner present, and 150 (21.6%) had a male householder with no partner present. 176 households (25.4%) were one person, and 69 (10.0%) were one person aged 65 or older. The average household size was 2.38. There were 472 families (68.1% of all households).

The age distribution was 344 people (20.8%) under the age of 18, 106 people (6.4%) aged 18 to 24, 437 people (26.5%) aged 25 to 44, 487 people (29.5%) aged 45 to 64, and 277 people (16.8%) who were 65 years of age or older. The median age was 42.8 years. For every 100 females, there were 106.9 males, and for every 100 females age 18 and over, there were 106.8 males age 18 and over.

There were 733 housing units at an average density of 118.2 units per square mile (45.6 units/km^{2}), of which 693 (94.5%) were occupied. Of these, 587 (84.7%) were owner-occupied, and 106 (15.3%) were occupied by renters. Of all housing units, 5.5% were vacant. The homeowner vacancy rate was 1.0% and the rental vacancy rate was 0.0%.

=== Income and poverty ===
In 2023, the US Census Bureau estimated that the median household income was $102,333, and the per capita income was $46,333. About 0.0% of families and 5.3% of the population were below the poverty line.

== Education ==
The CDP is served by Hughes-Elizabeth Lakes Union Elementary School District and by the Antelope Valley Union Joint High School District.

== See also ==
- Elizabeth Lake
- Hughes Lake
- Lake Hughes — the town
- Angeles National Forest
- Category:Sierra Pelona Ridge – related topics
