= Lake Hughes, California =

Census-designated place in California, United States

- Unincorporated community Census designated place
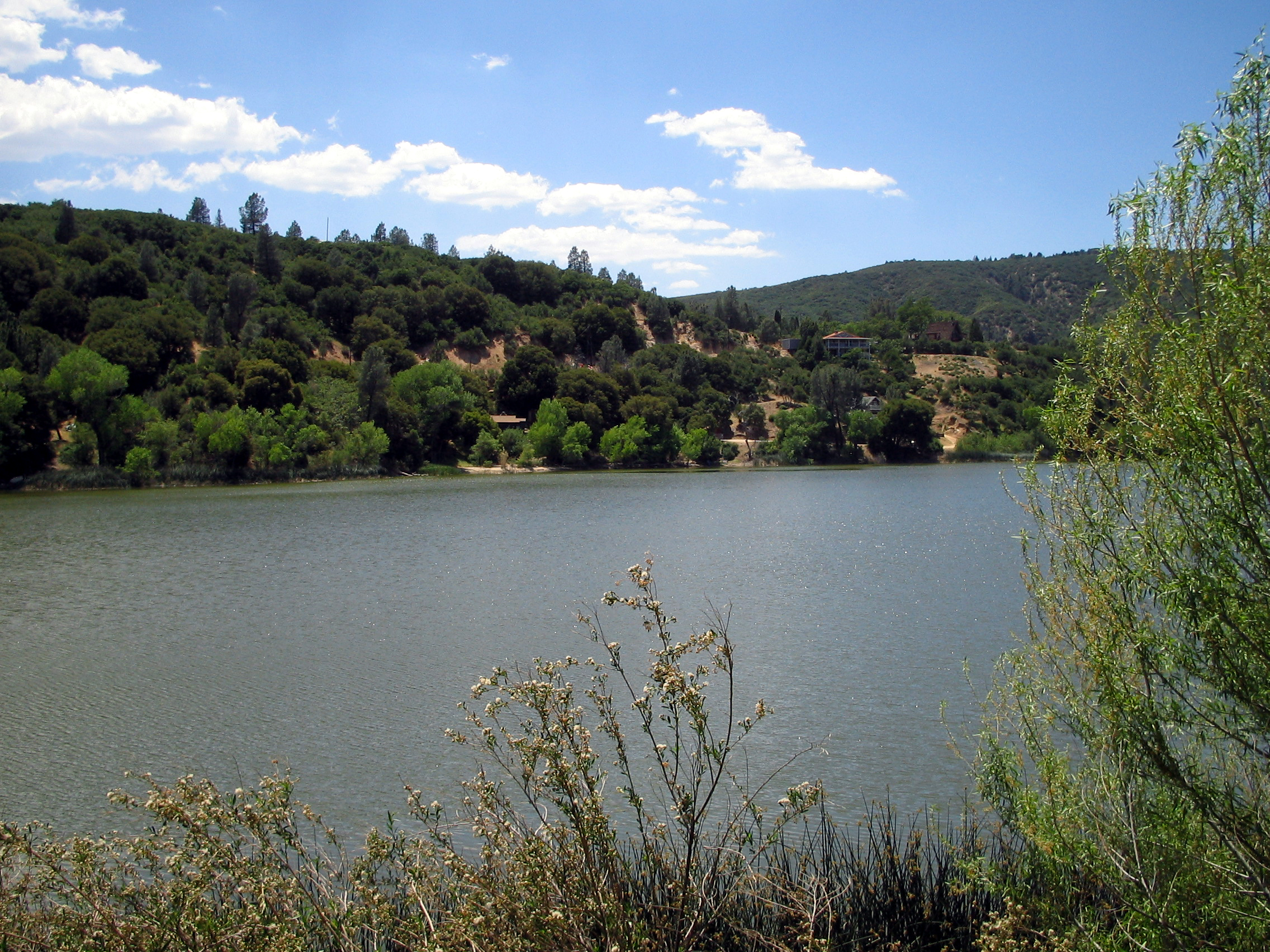
- Hughes Lake

- Location in Los Angeles County, California

- Location within the State of California Lake Hughes (the United States)
- Coordinates: 34.677°N 118.445°W
- Country: United States
- State: California
- County: Los Angeles
- Settled: 1873

Area
  - Total: 10.680 sq mi (27.661 km^{2})
  - Land: 10.616 sq mi (27.495 km^{2})
  - Water: 0.064 sq mi (0.166 km^{2}) 0.60%
- Elevation: 3,228 ft (984 m)

Population (2020)
  - Total: 544
  - Density: 51.2/sq mi (19.8/km^{2})
- Time zone: UTC-8 (Pacific)
  - Summer (DST): UTC-7 (PDT)
- ZIP codes: 93532
- Area code: 661
- FIPS code: 06-39556
- GNIS feature IDs: 1660877, 2583050

Lake Hughes is an unincorporated community and census-designated place in northern Los Angeles County, California, United States. It is in the Sierra Pelona Mountains, northwest of Palmdale and north of the Santa Clarita Valley, in the Angeles National Forest. It is on the sag pond waters of Lake Hughes and Elizabeth Lake. The community is rural in character, with a population of 544 at the 2020 census, but also has a strong recreational element centered on the three lakes in the vicinity. The community of Elizabeth Lake is located just east of Lake Hughes, sharing the same ZIP code.

== History ==
Nearby Elizabeth Lake, known then as La Laguna de Chico Lopez, was a watering locale on Spanish colonial and Mexican El Camino Viejo in Alta California and the Gold Rush era Stockton – Los Angeles Road. From 1858 to 1861, Lake Hughes was on the route of the Butterfield Overland Mail, between the Widow Smith's Station and Mud Spring stage stops. The lake area was to the west of Rancho La Liebre, an 1846 Mexican land grant now part of Tejon Ranch.

Lake Hughes was named for Judge Griffith (Patrick) Hughes, who homesteaded the area around the turn of the 20th century. Settlers were drawn to the area because water was more plentiful than in the drier Antelope Valley.

In 1907 William Mulholland, superintendent of the Los Angeles Department of Water and Power, started work on the Elizabeth Lake Tunnel for transporting water in the Los Angeles Aqueduct from Owens Valley to Los Angeles. Less than a half a mile east of Lake Hughes, the five-mile-long (8 km) tunnel is 285 feet (87 m) under the valley floor. The tunnel was driven from both ends. The north portal is at Fairmont Reservoir and the south in Bear Canyon (now Portal Canyon) just off of Green Valley. This 11-foot-wide (3.4 m) tunnel was driven 27,000 ft (8.2 km) through solid rock and met in the center within 1 1/2 inches (3.8 cm) in line and 5/8 inch (1.6 cm) in depth. Work was around the clock and averaged about 11 feet (3.4 m) per day. The Elizabeth Lake Tunnel was the largest single construction project on the Los Angeles Aqueduct and set speed records in its day.

Clarence A. Austin and George Claxton advertised Lake Hughes in 1922 as a getaway for hunting, fishing, and swimming and as a "fine mountain resort on the edge of Antelope Valley" in 1924.

The 2020 Lake fire was also first reported here.

== Geography ==
Lake Hughes is generally centered on the intersection of Elizabeth Lake Road and Lake Hughes Road, both of which are county highways. Hughes Lake and Munz Lakes are located within the community. In addition, a third lake, Lake Elizabeth is located just to the east within the community of Elizabeth Lake. Lakes Hughes and Lake Elizabeth are in the canyons along the San Andreas Fault. Both lakes periodically dry up depending on rainfall cycles. Lake Hughes was previously known as West Elizabeth Lake.

=== Climate ===
Lake Hughes has a warm-summer Mediterranean climate. Its location in the San Gabriel Mountains allows for more moderate and less extreme temperatures and more precipitation in contrast to the neighboring Antelope Valley, which is the west end of the Mojave Desert. Summers are warm to hot and dry with highs normally at 90 °F and lows in the mid 60s. Winters are cool and wet with temperatures commonly reaching below 32 °F with highs in the low 50s . Lake Hughes mainly receives precipitation between October and April with an average of 18 inches per year while snowfall amounts are very small but not unseen, as the seasonal average is around 5 inches.

Climate data for Lake Hughes, California
Month	Jan	Feb	Mar	Apr	May	Jun	Jul	Aug	Sep	Oct	Nov	Dec	Year
Record high °F (°C)	83 (28)	84 (29)	90 (32)	101 (38)	102 (39)	108 (42)	116 (47)	114 (46)	113 (45)	102 (39)	90 (32)	84 (29)	116 (47)
Mean daily maximum °F (°C)	53 (12)	57 (14)	60 (16)	66 (19)	74 (23)	83 (28)	90 (32)	90 (32)	85 (29)	74 (23)	62 (17)	54 (12)	71 (22)
Mean daily minimum °F (°C)	35 (2)	38 (3)	40 (4)	43 (6)	50 (10)	58 (14)	65 (18)	64 (18)	59 (15)	50 (10)	41 (5)	35 (2)	48 (9)
Record low °F (°C)	13 (−11)	20 (−7)	23 (−5)	21 (−6)	31 (−1)	36 (2)	40 (4)	43 (6)	35 (2)	28 (−2)	22 (−6)	17 (−8)	13 (−11)
Average precipitation inches (mm)	3.64 (92)	4.30 (109)	3.50 (89)	1.00 (25)	0.43 (11)	0.08 (2.0)	0.07 (1.8)	0.15 (3.8)	0.32 (8.1)	0.47 (12)	1.18 (30)	2.43 (62)	17.56 (446)
Average snowfall inches (cm)	1.5 (3.8)	1.0 (2.5)	0.2 (0.51)	0 (0)	0 (0)	0 (0)	0 (0)	0 (0)	0 (0)	0 (0)	0 (0)	2.5 (6.4)	5.2 (13.21)

== Government and associations ==
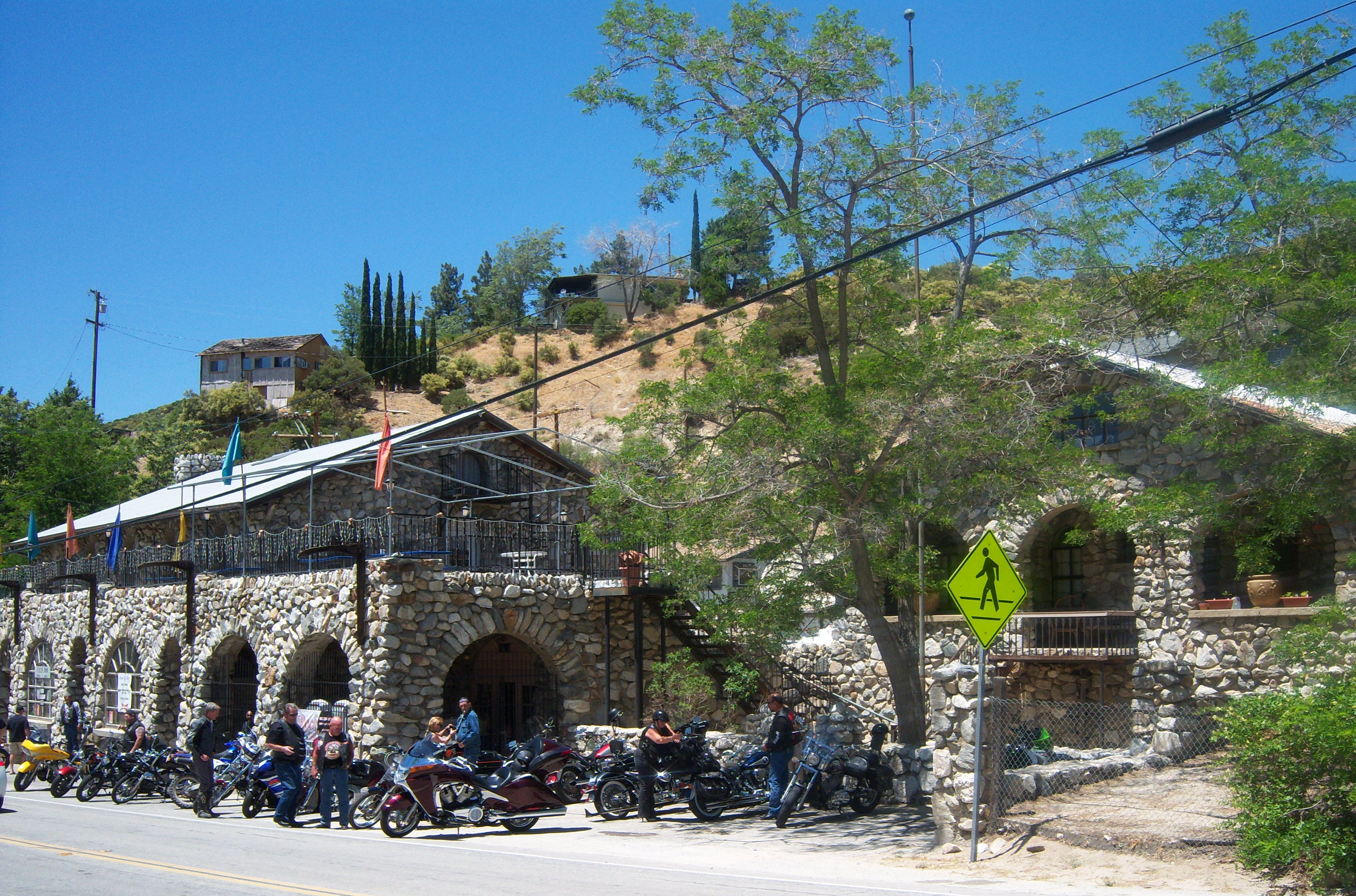
Rock Inn, Lake Hughes. A notable 'watering hole' since 1929.

The Los Angeles County Sheriff's Department (LASD) operates the Palmdale Station in Palmdale, serving Lake Hughes.

Lake Hughes has its own community town council, The Lakes Town Council, which meets twice a month at the Lakes Community Center. The council helps plan community events (such as the yearly 49ers day festival and parade), hosts socials and mixers, and works with Los Angeles County officials on community planning and community standards.

There are many clubs and associations within the Lake Hughes and Elizabeth Lake area. The most prominent is the Ranch Club, the town's country club and golf course. It has been open for over 60 years. The 8,400-square-foot (780 m^{2}) clubhouse incorporates the historic Frakes homestead of Samuel H. T. Frakes and Almeda Mudgett Frakes which was once a way station along the old stagecoach route. Others include the Lakes Women's Club, The Go for Fun Club, Lakes And Valleys Conservancy Group, Lakes & Valleys Art Guild, Fire Safe Council and the Lakes Baseball & Softball Teams.

== Demographics ==
Historical population
Census	Pop.	Note	%±
2010	649		—
2020	544		−16.2%
U.S. Decennial Census; 2000 2010; 2020

Lake Hughes first appeared as a census designated place in the 2010 U.S. census.

Lake Hughes CDP, California – Racial and ethnic composition Note: the US Census treats Hispanic/Latino as an ethnic category. This table excludes Latinos from the racial categories and assigns them to a separate category. Hispanics/Latinos may be of any race.
Race / Ethnicity (NH = Non-Hispanic)	Pop 2010	Pop 2020	% 2010	% 2020
White alone (NH)	503	384	77.50%	70.59%
Black or African American alone (NH)	18	2	2.77%	0.37%
Native American or Alaska Native alone (NH)	5	0	0.77%	0.00%
Asian alone (NH)	5	8	0.77%	1.47%
Native Hawaiian or Pacific Islander alone (NH)	0	1	0.00%	0.18%
Other race alone (NH)	1	4	0.15%	0.74%
Mixed race or Multiracial (NH)	13	19	2.00%	3.49%
Hispanic or Latino (any race)	104	126	16.02%	23.16%
Total	649	544	100.00%	100.00%

=== 2020 ===
The 2020 United States census reported that Lake Hughes had a population of 544. The population density was 51.2 inhabitants per square mile (19.8/km^{2}). The racial makeup of Lake Hughes was 415 (76.3%) White, 5 (0.9%) African American, 8 (1.5%) Native American, 8 (1.5%) Asian, 4 (0.7%) Pacific Islander, 46 (8.5%) from other races, and 58 (10.7%) from two or more races. Hispanic or Latino of any race were 126 persons (23.2%).

The whole population lived in households. There were 250 households, out of which 61 (24.4%) had children under the age of 18 living in them, 113 (45.2%) were married-couple households, 21 (8.4%) were cohabiting couple households, 43 (17.2%) had a female householder with no partner present, and 73 (29.2%) had a male householder with no partner present. 84 households (33.6%) were one person, and 42 (16.8%) were one person aged 65 or older. The average household size was 2.18. There were 147 families (58.8% of all households).

The age distribution was 77 people (14.2%) under the age of 18, 22 people (4.0%) aged 18 to 24, 152 people (27.9%) aged 25 to 44, 195 people (35.8%) aged 45 to 64, and 98 people (18.0%) who were 65 years of age or older. The median age was 47.6 years. For every 100 females, there were 113.3 males.

There were 326 housing units at an average density of 30.7 units per square mile (11.9 units/km^{2}), of which 250 (76.7%) were occupied. Of these, 178 (71.2%) were owner-occupied, and 72 (28.8%) were occupied by renters.

=== 2010 ===
The 2010 United States census reported that Lake Hughes had a population of 649. The population density was 60.7 inhabitants per square mile (23.4/km^{2}). The racial makeup of Lake Hughes was 544 (83.8%) White (77.5% Non-Hispanic White), 19 (2.9%) African American, 7 (1.1%) Native American, 5 (0.8%) Asian, 1 (0.2%) Pacific Islander, 54 (8.3%) from other races, and 19 (2.9%) from two or more races. Hispanic or Latino of any race were 104 persons (16.0%).

The Census reported that 626 people (96.5% of the population) lived in households, 23 (3.5%) lived in non-institutionalized group quarters, and 0 (0%) were institutionalized.

There were 300 households, out of which 55 (18.3%) had children under the age of 18 living in them, 114 (38.0%) were opposite-sex married couples living together, 26 (8.7%) had a female householder with no husband present, 16 (5.3%) had a male householder with no wife present. There were 23 (7.7%) unmarried opposite-sex partnerships, and 4 (1.3%) same-sex married couples or partnerships. 111 households (37.0%) were made up of individuals, and 26 (8.7%) had someone living alone who was 65 years of age or older. The average household size was 2.09. There were 156 families (52.0% of all households); the average family size was 2.76.

The population was spread out, with 105 people (16.2%) under the age of 18, 53 people (8.2%) aged 18 to 24, 143 people (22.0%) aged 25 to 44, 273 people (42.1%) aged 45 to 64, and 75 people (11.6%) who were 65 years of age or older. The median age was 46.9 years. For every 100 females, there were 104.1 males. For every 100 females age 18 and over, there were 100.0 males.

There were 400 housing units at an average density of 37.4 per square mile (14.4/km^{2}), of which 175 (58.3%) were owner-occupied, and 125 (41.7%) were occupied by renters. The homeowner vacancy rate was 4.9%; the rental vacancy rate was 9.9%. 381 people (58.7% of the population) lived in owner-occupied housing units and 245 people (37.8%) lived in rental housing units.

According to the 2010 United States Census, Lake Hughes had a median household income of $53,281, with 29.0% of the population living below the federal poverty line.

== Education ==
Almost all of the CDP is in Hughes-Elizabeth Lakes Union Elementary School District with a portion extending into the Westside Union Elementary School District. All of the CDP is in the Antelope Valley Union Joint High School District.

In 1869 the Los Angeles County Board of Supervisors designated Elizabeth Lake School District to serve the area. Its school was the only one between Los Angeles and Bakersfield. A wooden structure was built that lasted until it was replaced in the early 1930s by the adobe structure on the east side of Elizabeth Lake Road, a quarter mile north of Andrada Corner (intersection of San Francisquito and Elizabeth Lake Roads). The district's name was changed to Hughes-Elizabeth Lakes Union School District.

The Hughes-Elizabeth Lakes Union Elementary School District is a California Distinguished School and serves kindergarten through 8th grade students. Children from the communities of Lake Hughes, Elizabeth Lake and Green Valley, as well as parts of Leona Valley and Pine Canyon, make up the student population, which is 81% White, 11% Hispanic and 8% other ethnic groups. The district has an approximate enrollment of 330 students.

== Notable people ==
In the spring of 1947, Roy Rogers purchased a new retreat at Lake Hughes. He named his home the "Sky Haven Ranch" and it is still referred to thus today. Cheryl Rogers, the first Rogers child of school age, began first grade at Lake Hughes School. The school was a large one-room house "up the school road" (a dirt road) from the trading post, which consisted of the post office and a filling station.

== See also ==
- Hughes Lake (California)
- Elizabeth Lake (Los Angeles County, California)
- Elizabeth Lake, California — town
- Angeles National Forest — surrounding Lake Hughes.
- Category:Sierra Pelona Ridge – related topics
