= Munz Lakes =

Sag pong on the San Andreas Fault in Lake Hughes, California

- Location within the Los Angeles metropolitan area Location within California
- Location: Sierra Pelona Mountains, Angeles National Forest, Los Angeles County, California
- Coordinates: 34.672763°N 118.432304°W
- Type: Sag pond
- Basin countries: United States
- Surface elevation: 984 m (3,228 ft)
- References: U.S. Geological Survey Geographic Names Information System: Munz Lakes

Munz Lakes is a small lake located directly on the San Andreas Fault in the northern Sierra Pelona Mountains, within Los Angeles County, California.

== Geography ==
The lake is one of a series of sag ponds created by active tectonic plate movement of the San Andreas Fault in the area, which also include Elizabeth Lake and Hughes Lake. They are part of the northern upper Santa Clara River watershed. The lakes at times dry up for years.

The lake, at 984 m (3,228 ft) in elevation, is protected within the Angeles National Forest.

== History ==
Munz Lakes receives its name from rancher John Munz, who arrived in the area in 1898.

== See also ==
- Category:Lakes of Los Angeles County, California
- Category:Sierra Pelona Ridge – related topics
- List of lakes in California
