= San Juan Township, Los Angeles County, California =

Former township in California

Coordinates: 33.5027°N 117.6625°W

San Juan Township is a defunct township in what was once part of Los Angeles County, California. It existed prior to the abolition of townships in California in the 1870s. It encompassed an area comprising several ranchos and the mission lands of Mission San Juan Capistrano in what is now southern Orange County. Census records report a population of 661 in 1860 and 445 in 1870.
