= Hughes-Elizabeth Lakes Union Elementary School District =

School district in California

Address
- 16633 Elizabeth Lake Road Lake Hughes, California, 93532; United States

District information
- Type: Public
- Grades: K–8
- NCES District ID: 0617880

Students and staff
- Students: 162 (2021–2022)
- Teachers: 8.89 (FTE)
- Staff: 16.70 (FTE)
- Student–teacher ratio: 18.22:1

Other information
- Website: helus.org

Hughes-Elizabeth Lakes Union Elementary School District is a school district based in Los Angeles County, California, United States. It serves the unincorporated community of Lake Hughes, and has one school under its jurisdiction.

== School ==
Hughes-Elizabeth Lakes Union Elementary is the only school within the district. In the year 2021, 68.5% of the student population are White, 28.1% are Hispanic or Latino, 2.2% are multiracial, and 1.1% are African American.
