= Hughes Lake (California) =

Lake in Lake Hughes, California

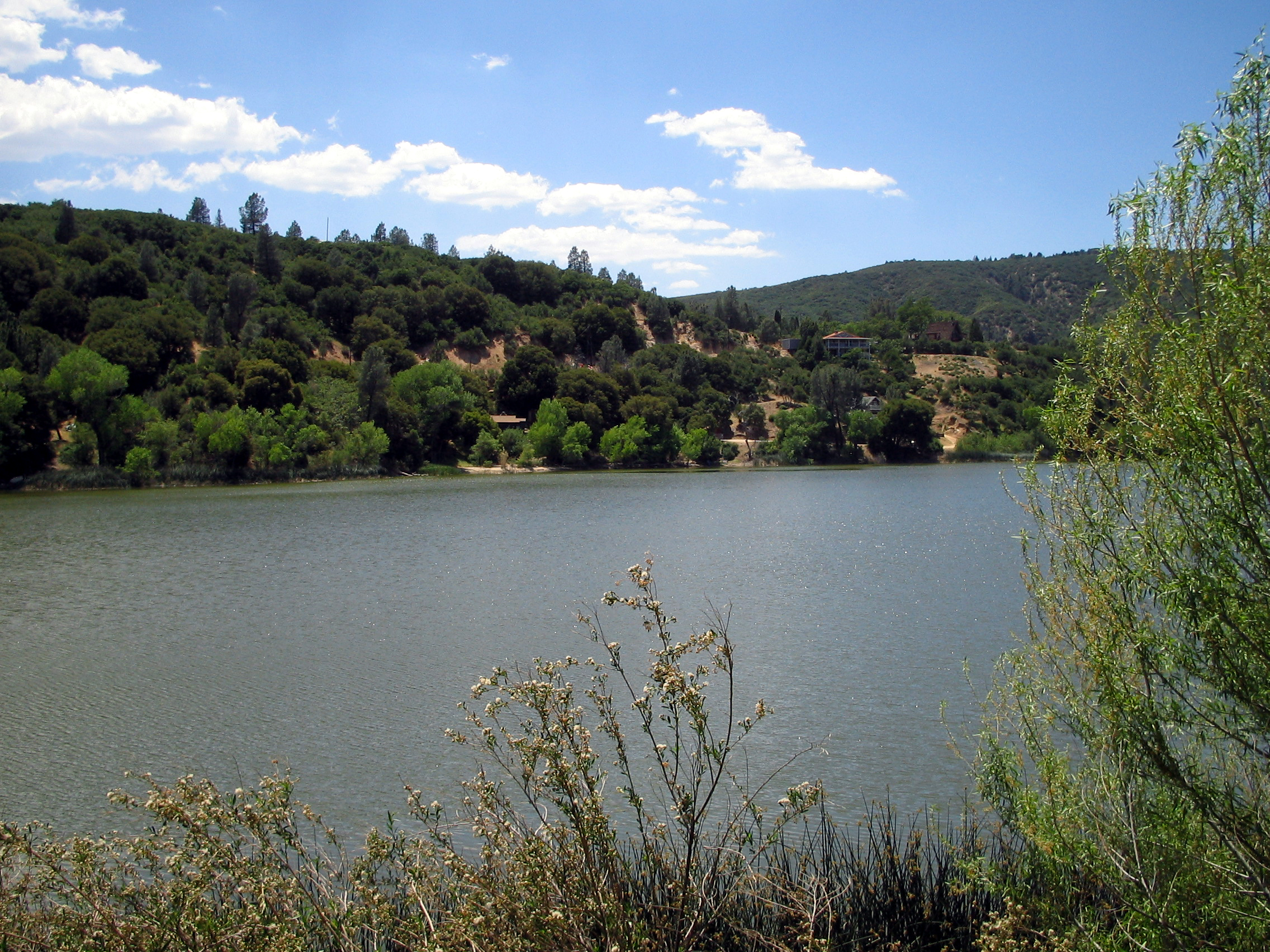

- Location within the Los Angeles metropolitan area Location within California Location within the United States
- Location: Sierra Pelona Mountains, Angeles National Forest, Los Angeles County, California
- Coordinates: 34°40′33″N 118°26′44″W
- Type: Sag pond
- Basin countries: United States
- Surface elevation: 3,192 ft (973 m)
- Settlements: Lake Hughes

Hughes Lake is a sag pond on the San Andreas Fault in the northern Sierra Pelona Mountains, in Los Angeles County, California. At times the lake goes completely dry for years, as its water supply depends on local winter rain and snowmelt. Neighboring Elizabeth Lake also has a history of going dry and refilling.

== Geography ==
Referred to before 1924 as West Elizabeth Lake, Lake Hughes is one of a series of sag ponds in the foothills of the Sierra Pelona Mountains, including Elizabeth Lake, and Munz Lakes, all created by the active motion of tectonic plates on the San Andreas Fault. They are part of the northern upper Santa Clara River watershed.

The lake, at 3,192 ft (973 m) in elevation, is within the Angeles National Forest.

The community of Lake Hughes, an unincorporated community, began settlement in the area around 1873.

== See also ==
- Category:Lakes of Los Angeles County, California
- Category:Sierra Pelona Ridge – related topics
- List of lakes in California
