= Tejon Township, Los Angeles County, California =

Coordinates: 34.8739°N 118.8945°W

Tejon Township was a defunct township in Los Angeles County, California. It existed prior to the abolition of townships in California in the 1870s. By far the largest of the county's townships, it encompassed an area from the San Gabriel and Santa Susana Mountains in the south to the Tulare County line in the north. It was centered on Fort Tejon. In 1860, the township had a population of 920.

When Kern County was created in 1866, much of the land in Tejon Township was transferred to the new county. The portion remaining in Los Angeles County became Soledad Township. Present-day communities located in the township include Lancaster, Palmdale, Santa Clarita and Frazier Park.
