= Soledad Township, Los Angeles County, California =

Defunct township in Los Angeles County, California, U.S.

Coordinates: 34.8739°N 118.8945°W

Soledad Township was a defunct township in Los Angeles County, California. It existed prior to the abolition of townships in California. It was formed in 1866 when Tejon Township was divided between Los Angeles and the new Kern County. Soledad Township was the county's most extensive but least populated township. It stretched from the San Gabriel and Santa Susana Mountains to the Kern County line and was centered on Soledad Canyon. In 1870, the township had a population of 265.
