= Los Angeles County, California =

Most populous county in the United States

Los Angeles County
- County
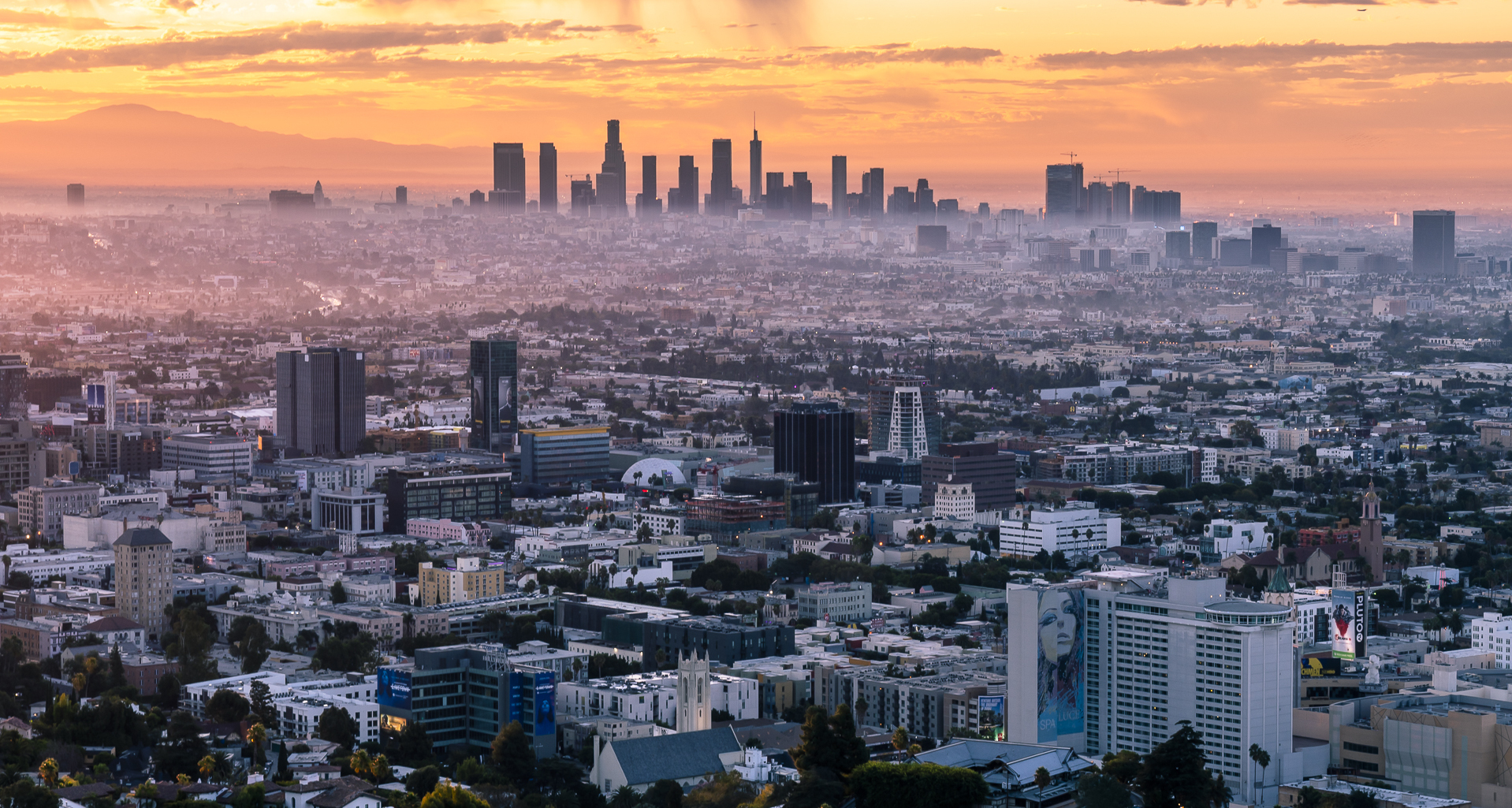
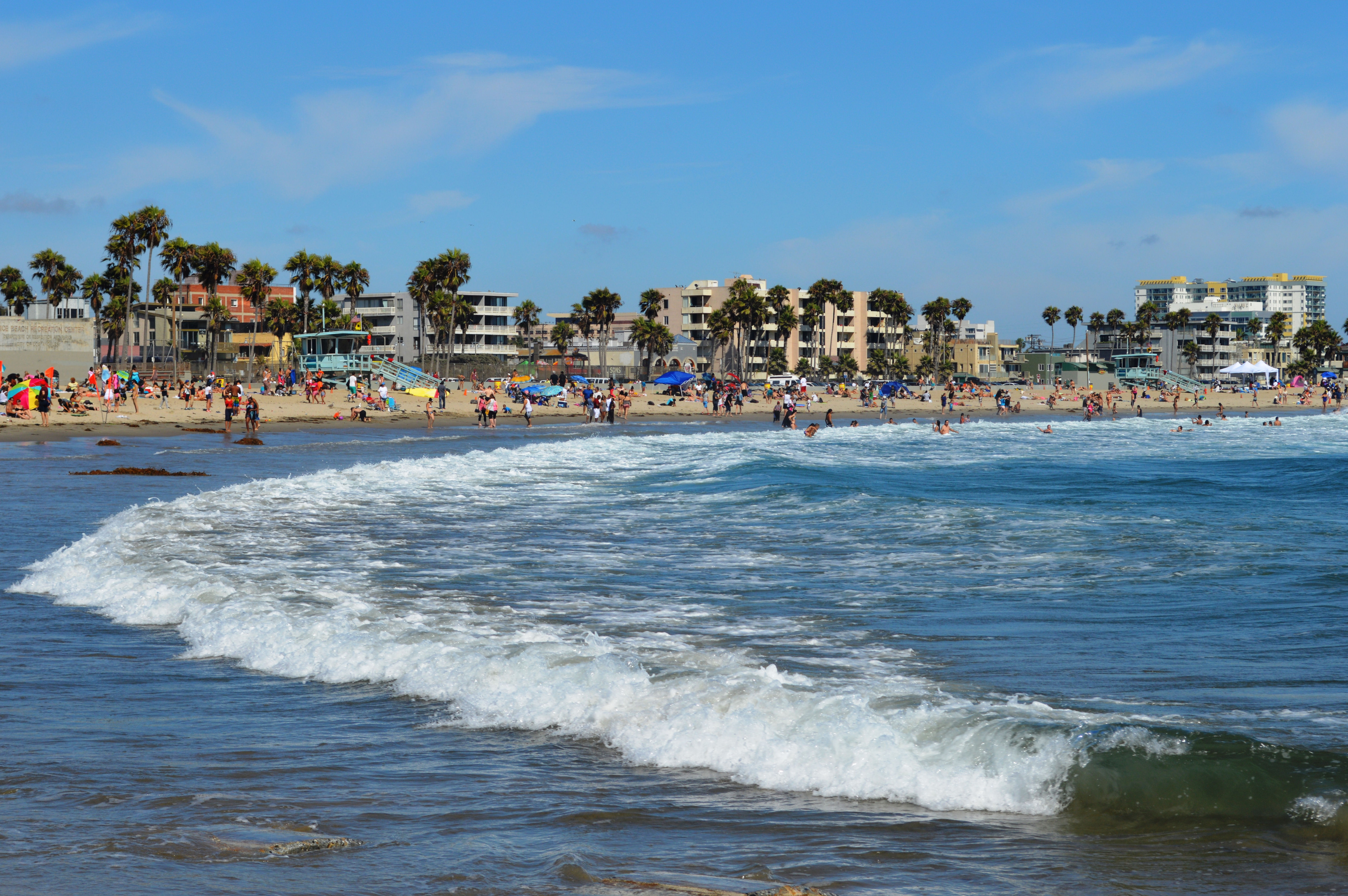
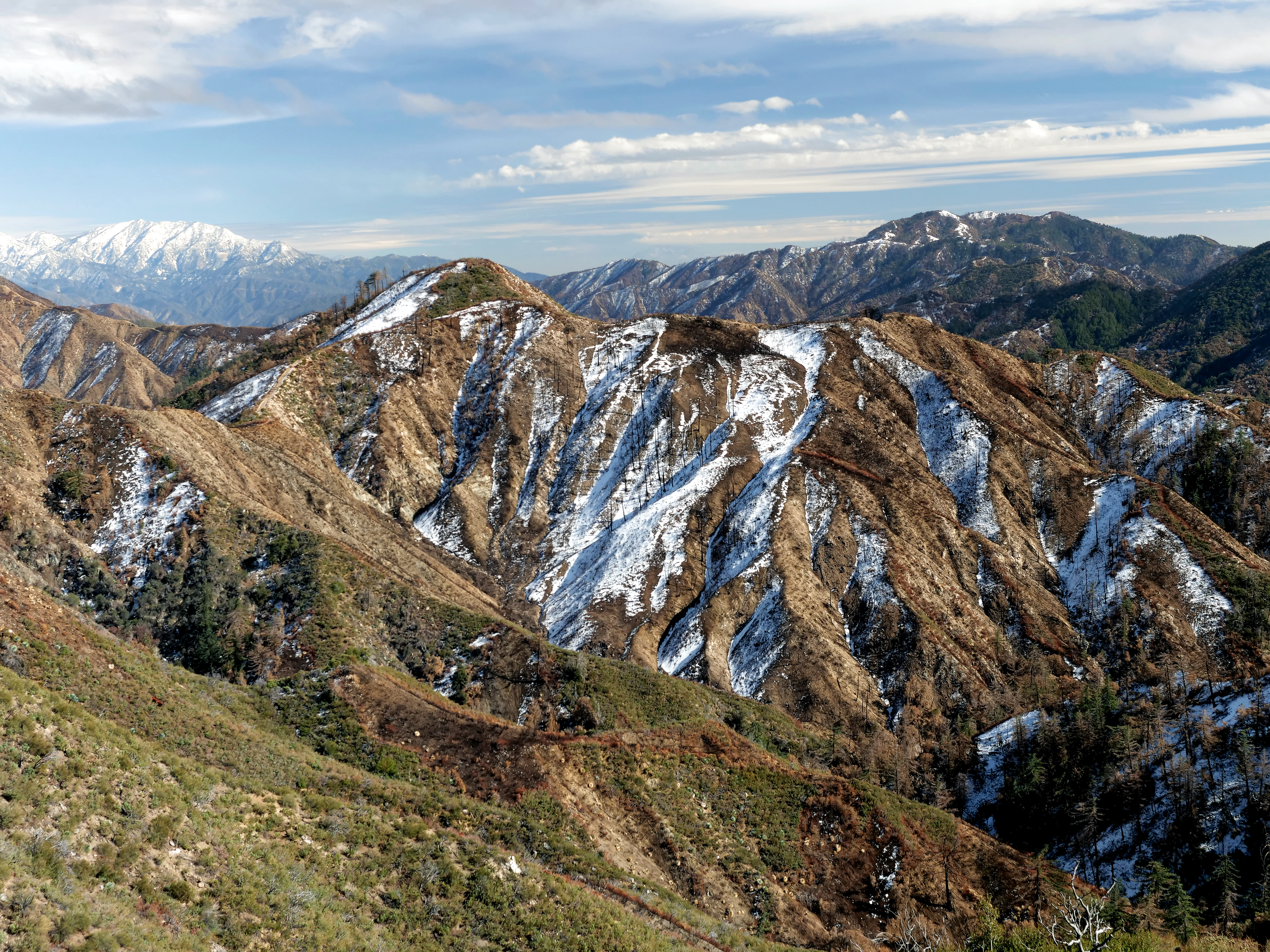
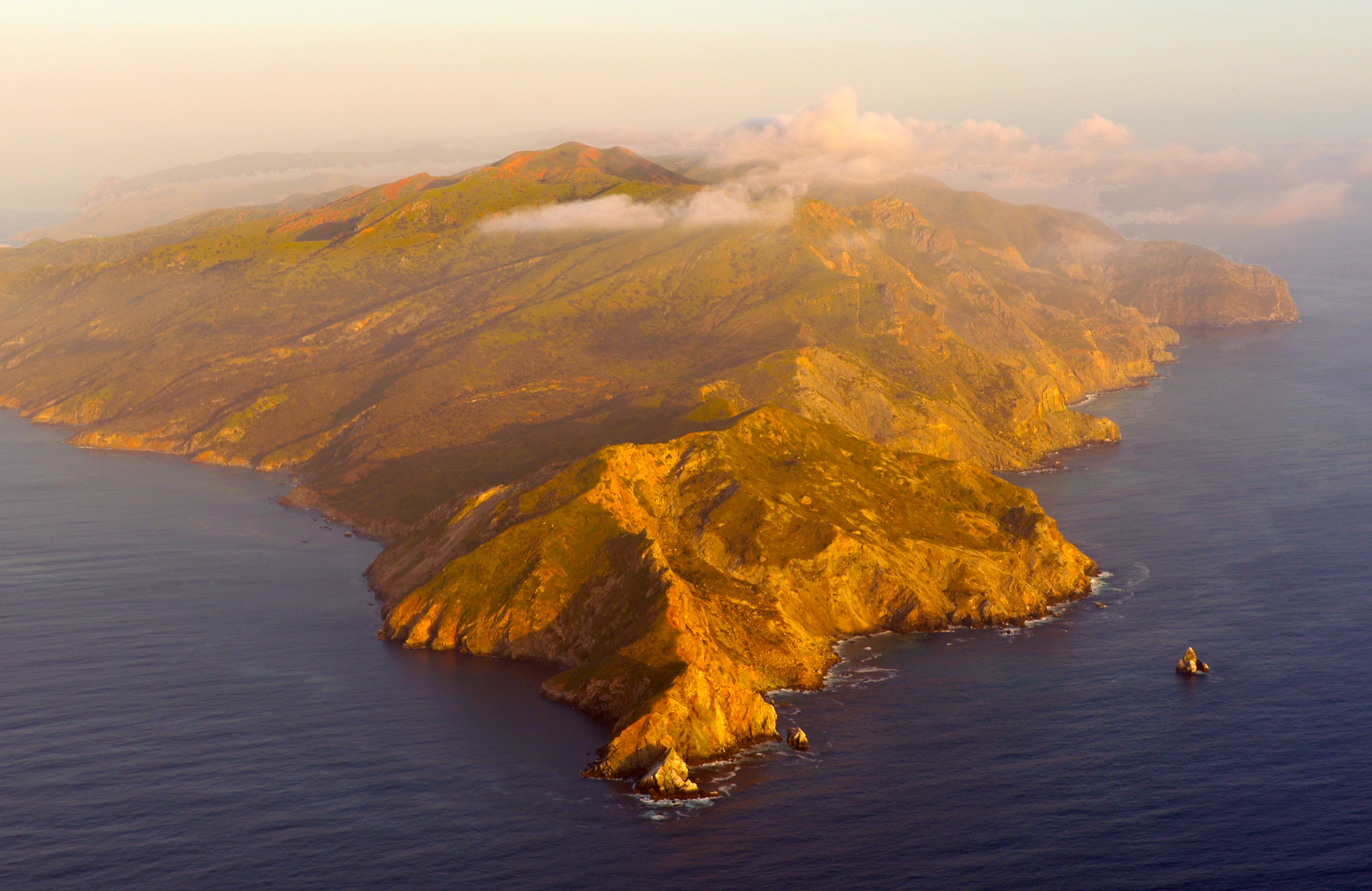
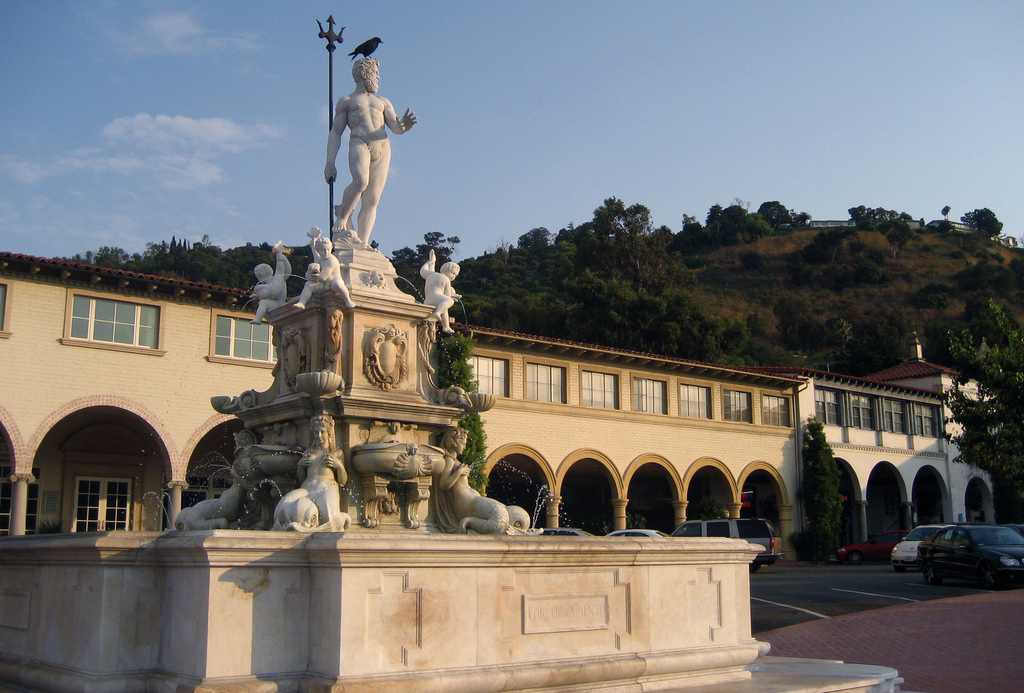
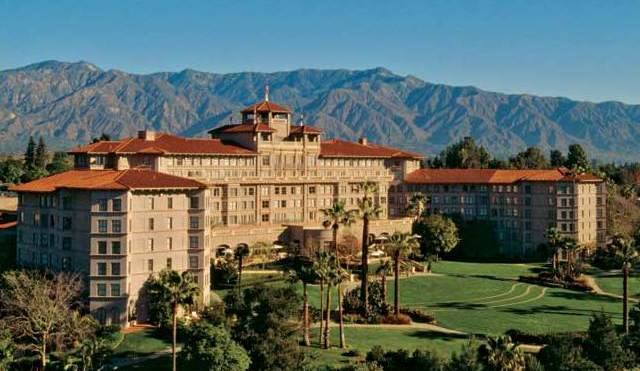
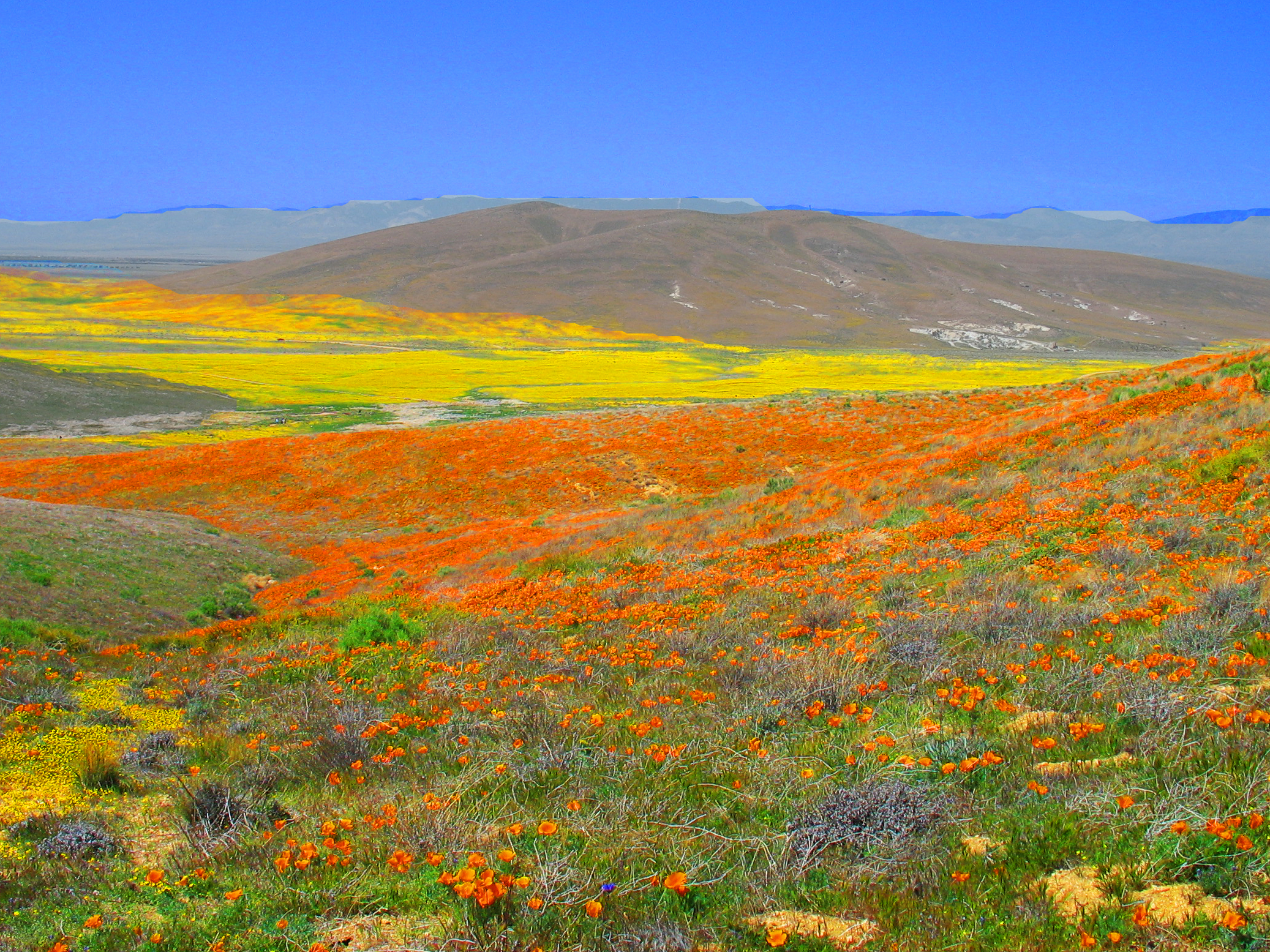
- Los Angeles Venice San Gabriel Mountains Santa Catalina Island Palos Verdes Pasadena Antelope Valley

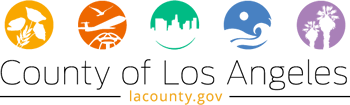
- Flag Seal Logo
- Nicknames: "LA County", "Metro-LA", "Greater LA"
- Interactive map of Los Angeles County
- Coordinates: 34°3′N 118°15′W
- Country: United States
- State: California
- Region: Greater Los Angeles
- Formed: February 18, 1850
- Named for: Our Lady, Queen of the Angels
- County seat: Los Angeles
- Largest city: Los Angeles
- Incorporated cities: 88

Government
  - Type: Council–CEO (Note: Mayor-Council In 2032)
  - Body: Board of Supervisors
  - Chair: Hilda Solis (D)
  - Chair Pro Tem: Holly Mitchell (D)
  - Board of Supervisors: Supervisors: Hilda Solis (D); Holly Mitchell (D); Lindsey Horvath (D); Janice Hahn (D); Kathryn Barger (R)
  - Chief Executive Officer: Joseph M. Nicchitta

Area
  - Total: 4,751 sq mi (12,310 km^{2})
  - Land: 4,058 sq mi (10,510 km^{2})
  - Water: 693 sq mi (1,790 km^{2}) 15%
- Highest elevation: 10,064 ft (3,068 m)
- Lowest elevation: 0 ft (0 m)

Population (2020)
  - Total: 10,014,009
  - Estimate (2025): 9,694,934 ▼
  - Density: 2,468/sq mi (952.8/km^{2})

GDP
  - Total: $1.003 trillion · 2nd by U.S. county (2024)
  - Per capita: $102,899 (2024)
- Time zone: UTC−8 (Pacific Time Zone)
  - Summer (DST): UTC−7 (Pacific Daylight Time)
- ZIP Codes: 90xxx–918xx, 92397, 92821, 92823, 93243, 935xx
- Area codes: 213/323, 310/424, 442/760, 562, 626, 657/714, 661, 747/818, 840/909
- FIPS code: 06-037
- GNIS feature ID: 277283
- Congressional districts: 23rd, 26th, 27th, 28th, 29th, 30th, 31st, 32nd, 34th, 35th, 36th, 37th, 38th, 42nd, 43rd, 44th, 45th
- Website: lacounty.gov

Los Angeles County, sometimes abbreviated as LA County, is a county in the U.S. state of California, in the southern region of the state. It is the most populous county in the United States, with 9,694,934 residents estimated in 2025. Its population is greater than that of 40 individual U.S. states. Comprising 88 incorporated cities and 101 unincorporated areas within a total area of 4,083 square miles (10,570 km^{2}), it accommodates more than a quarter of Californians and is one of the most ethnically diverse U.S. counties. The county's seat, Los Angeles, is the second most populous city in the United States, with 3,878,704 residents estimated in 2024. The county is globally known as the home of the U.S. motion picture industry since its inception in the early 20th century.

== History ==
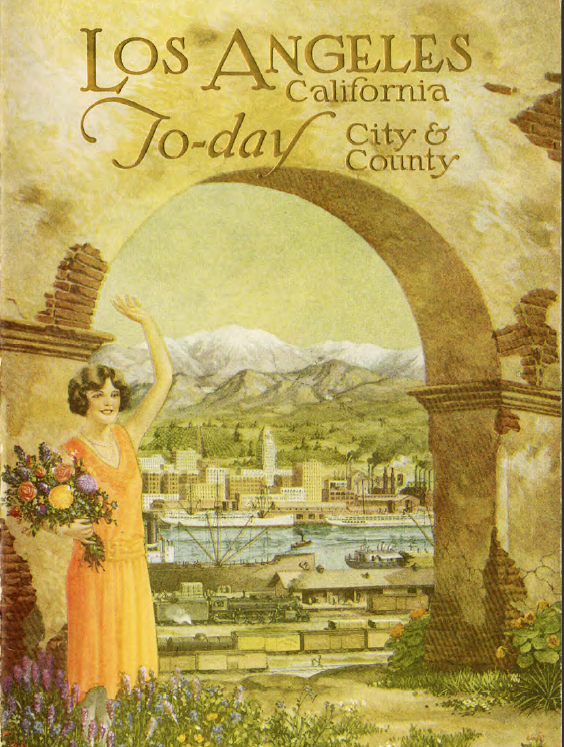
Brochure for Los Angeles, c. 1930

The County of Los Angeles is one of the original counties of California, created at the time of statehood in 1850. The county originally included parts of what are now Kern, San Bernardino, Riverside, Inyo, Tulare, Ventura, and Orange counties. In 1851 and 1852, Los Angeles County stretched from the coast to the state line of Nevada. As the population increased, sections were split off to organize San Bernardino County in 1853, Kern County in 1866, and Orange County in 1889.

Before the 1870s, Los Angeles County was divided into townships (many of which were amalgamations of one or more old ranchos):

- Azusa – encompassed the foothill communities east of the San Gabriel River, including present-day Covina and Duarte
- El Monte – encompassed communities in the Whittier Narrows area, including present-day El Monte, La Puente, as well as Monterey Park
  - Azusa and El Monte Townships – merged for the 1870 census
- City of Los Angeles – then consisting solely of its four-league Spanish land grant
- Los Angeles Township – consisted of areas surrounding the City of Los Angeles, including the San Fernando Valley and present-day West Los Angeles and East Los Angeles. Most of this area has now been annexed to the city of Los Angeles.
- Los Nietos – consisted of areas south of the Whittier Narrows and Puente Hills south to present-day Long Beach, centered on the early settlement at Los Nietos. Some of this area is now in Orange County
- San Jose – consisted of the eastern portions of the county drained by San Jose Creek, including what is now the cities of Pomona, Claremont and Walnut
- San Gabriel – consisted of the western San Gabriel Valley and foothill communities, including present-day Alhambra and Pasadena. Centered on the Mission San Gabriel
- Santa Ana – consisted of what is now northern and central Orange County, including what is now Fullerton, Huntington Beach and the City of Orange. (Centered on Santa Ana).
  - For the 1870 census, Anaheim district was enumerated separately
- San Juan – consisted of what is now southern Orange County. Centered on Mission San Juan Capistrano
- San Pedro – consisted of the present-day South Bay communities, Compton and western Long Beach. Centered on the wharf of San Pedro. (Renamed Wilmington Township by 1870).
- Tejon – consisted of all of northern Los Angeles County and what is now southern Kern County. Centered on Fort Tejon
  - When Kern County was formed, the portion of the township remaining in Los Angeles County became Soledad Township.

== Geography ==
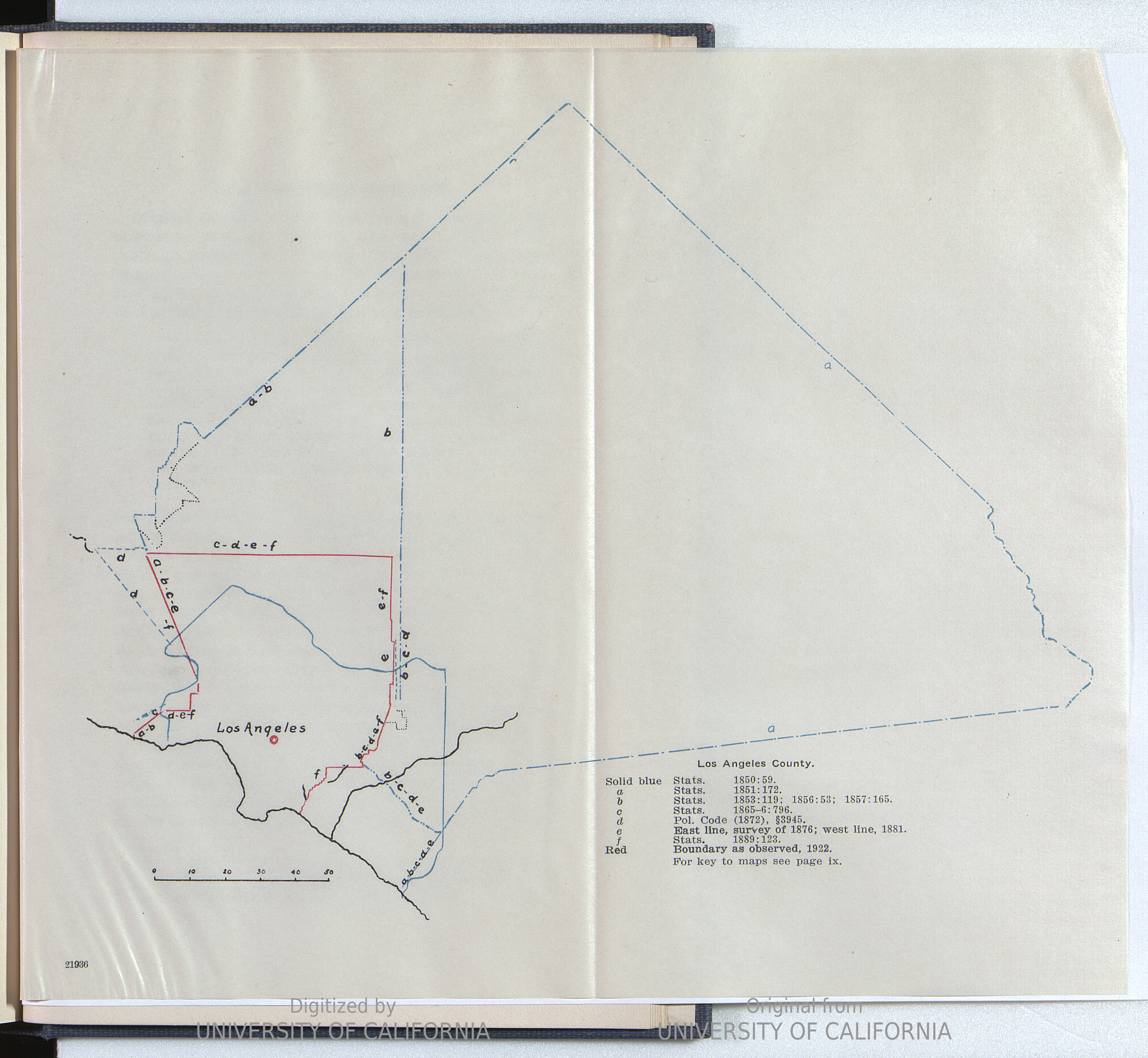
The historical boundaries of Los Angeles County since its establishment in 1850 as defined by the California State Legislature. The solid blue line represents the original boundaries of the county, the dashed blue lines represent the changes made to the boundaries, and the red line represents the final major boundary changes of the county made by the Legislature in 1889. This map does not include minor changes to the boundary after 1922, such as the transfer of a small amount land east of Interstate 5 to Kern County, among others. Portions or the entirety of modern-day Inyo, Kern, Orange, Riverside, San Bernardino, San Diego, and Ventura counties were formerly in Los Angeles County.

According to the U.S. Census Bureau, the county has an area of 4,751 square miles (12,310 km^{2}), of which 4,058 square miles (10,510 km^{2}) (85%) is land and 693 square miles (1,790 km^{2}) (15%) is water. Los Angeles County borders 70 miles (110 km) of coast on the Pacific Ocean and encompasses mountain ranges, valleys, forests, islands, lakes, rivers, and desert. The Los Angeles River, Rio Hondo, Ballona Creek, the San Gabriel River and the Santa Clara River flow in Los Angeles County, while the primary mountain ranges are the Santa Monica Mountains and the San Gabriel Mountains. The western extent of the Mojave Desert begins in the Antelope Valley, in the northeastern part of the county. Los Angeles County is bordered on the north by Kern County, on the east by San Bernardino County, on the southeast by Orange County, on the south by the Pacific Ocean, and on the west by Ventura County.

Most of the population of Los Angeles County resides in the south and southwest, with major population centers in the Los Angeles Basin, San Fernando Valley, and San Gabriel Valley. Other population centers are found in the Santa Clarita Valley, Pomona Valley, Crescenta Valley and Antelope Valley.

The county is divided west-to-east by the San Gabriel Mountains, which are part of the Transverse Ranges of southern California, and are contained mostly within the Angeles National Forest. Most of the county's highest peaks are in the San Gabriel Mountains, including Mount San Antonio 10,068 feet (3,069 m) at the Los Angeles–San Bernardino county lines, Mount Baden-Powell 9,399 feet (2,865 m), Mount Burnham 8,997 feet (2,742 m) and Mount Wilson 5,710 feet (1,740 m). Several lower mountains are in the northern, western, and southwestern parts of the county, including the San Emigdio Mountains, the southernmost part of Tehachapi Mountains and the Sierra Pelona Mountains.

Los Angeles County includes San Clemente Island and Santa Catalina Island, which are part of the Channel Islands archipelago off the Pacific Coast.

=== Lakes and reservoirs ===
- Bouquet Reservoir
- Castaic Lake
- Crystal Lake
- Elizabeth Lake
- Holiday Lake
- Hollywood Reservoir
- Hughes Lake
- Jackson Lake
- Las Virgenes Reservoir
- Malibou Lake
- Morris Reservoir
- Munz Lakes
- Lake Palmdale
- Puddingstone Reservoir
- Pyramid Lake
- Quail Lake
- Silver Lake Reservoir
- Stone Canyon Reservoir
- Tweedy Lake
- Westlake in City of Westlake Village
- Lake Lindero

=== Major divisions of the county ===
- East: Eastside, San Gabriel Valley, portions of the Pomona Valley
- West: Westside, Beach Cities
- South: South Bay, South Los Angeles, Palos Verdes Peninsula, Gateway Cities, Los Angeles Harbor Region
- North: San Fernando Valley, Crescenta Valley, portions of the Conejo Valley, portions of the Antelope Valley and Santa Clarita Valley
- Central: Downtown Los Angeles, Mid-Wilshire, Northeast Los Angeles

=== National protected areas ===
- Angeles National Forest (part)
- Los Padres National Forest (part)
- Santa Monica Mountains National Recreation Area (part)

=== Climate ===
The Northern part of the county has a Desert climate, while the rest of the county generally is a mix of semi-arid and a hot-summer Mediterranean climate. There is rainfall mostly in the wintertime, but the mountains in the north-central part of the county also receive snow during winter.

== Demographics ==
Despite an expected population exodus and significant decline of over 1.4 million people from Los Angeles County being forecast over the next few decades, the county is expected to maintain its spot as the most populous U.S. county.

Historical population
Census	Pop.	Note	%±
1850	3,530		—
1860	11,333		221.0%
1870	15,309		35.1%
1880	33,381		118.0%
1890	101,454		203.9%
1900	170,298		67.9%
1910	504,131		196.0%
1920	936,455		85.8%
1930	2,208,492		135.8%
1940	2,785,643		26.1%
1950	4,151,687		49.0%
1960	6,038,771		45.5%
1970	7,041,980		16.6%
1980	7,477,503		6.2%
1990	8,863,164		18.5%
2000	9,519,338		7.4%
2010	9,818,605		3.1%
2020	10,014,009		2.0%
2025 (est.)	9,694,934		−3.2%
U.S. Decennial Census; 1790–1960 1900–1990; 1990–2000 2010 2020

Racial composition as of 2023 07 01
Total population	9,663,345	100%
Hispanics	4,695,902	48.59%
Non-Hispanic Whites	2,369,899	24.52%
Asians	1,454,666	15.05%
Blacks	709,583	7.34%
Native Americans	16,890	0.17%
Pacific Islanders	19,128	0.20%
Multiracial Americans	336,840	3.49%

Racial composition	2020	2010	2000	1990	1980	1970	1960	1950	1940
Hispanics	48.0%	47.7%	44.5%	37.8%	27.6%	14.9%	11%	5.8%	2.2%
Non-Hispanic Whites	25.6%	27.8%	31.1%	40.8%	52.8%	70.9%	79.3%	87.9%	93.3%
Asians	14.7%	13.5%	11.9%	11%	5.6%	2.9%	1.9%	1.3%	1.9%
Blacks	7.6%	8.3%	9.7%	11.1%	12.6%	10.8%	7.6%	5%	2.7%
Native Americans	0.2%	0.2%	0.8%	0.5%	0.64%	0.35%	0.13%	-	-
Pacific Islanders	0.2%	0.2%	-	-	-	-	-	-	-
Multiracial Americans	3.0%	2.0%	-	-	-	-	-	-	-

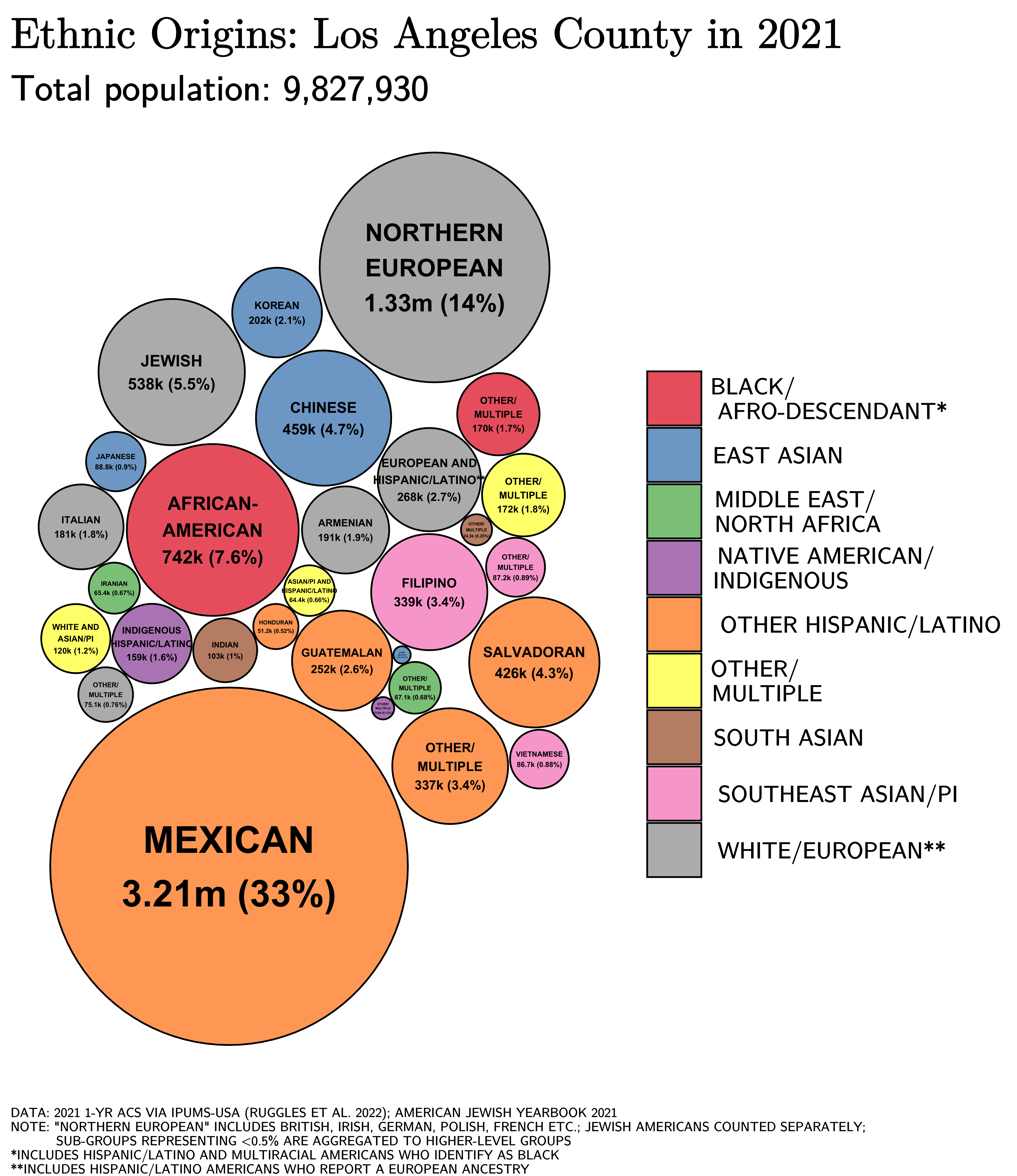

Whites reached their peak number (4,897,580) in 1960. Blacks reached their peak number (931,449) in 1990. Most of the growth has come from Hispanics and Asians.

Los Angeles County is home to the largest numbers of Burmese, Cambodian, Chinese, Filipino, Indonesian, Korean, Taiwanese, and Thai outside their respective countries. The largest Asian groups are Chinese (4.0%), Filipino (3.3%), Korean (2.2%), Japanese (1.0%), Vietnamese (0.9%), Indian (0.8%), and Cambodian (0.3%).

The county is home to the largest Armenian population outside of Armenia. It also accommodates the largest Iranian population outside of Iran of any other county or county equivalent globally.

The ASC aggregate data for 2006–2010 show that 43.59% of the population reported speaking only English at home; 39.38% spoke Spanish, 3.64% Chinese, 2.46% Tagalog, 2.02% Korean, 1.70% Armenian, 0.82% Vietnamese, 0.80% Persian, 0.63% Japanese, and 0.52% Russian.

=== Income ===
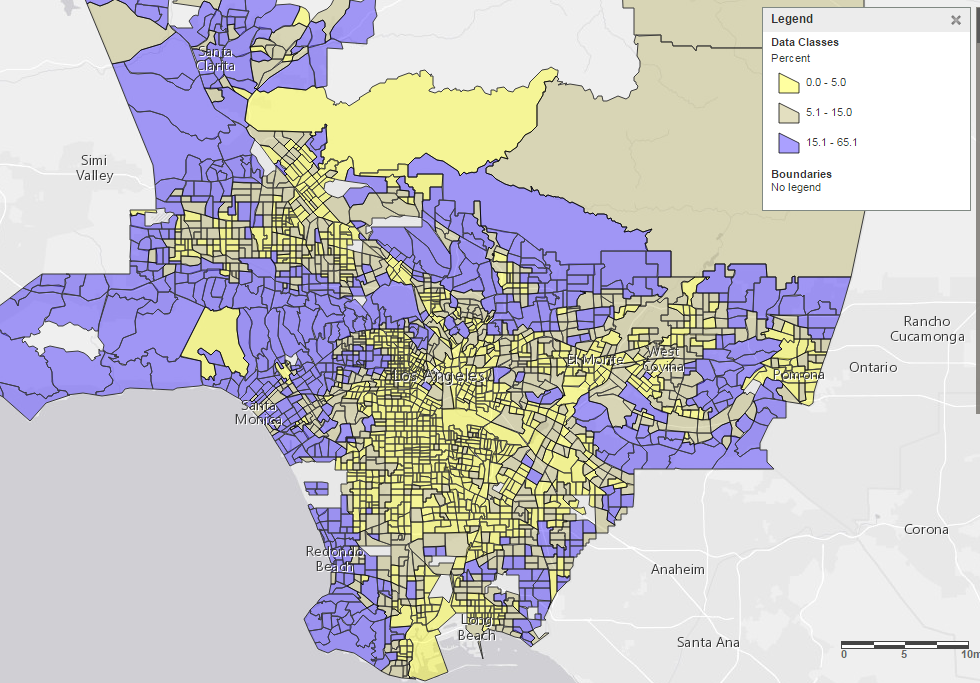
Percent of households with incomes above $150k across LA County census tracts

In 2024, the Area Median Income (AMI) for a one-person household in Los Angeles County was $74,600 ($6,217 per month); for a four-person household, $106,600 ($8,883 per month).

As of 2024 12 12, the homeownership rate was 49.81%. As of 2025 12 23, the median home value was $859,958. Multi-unit structures comprised approximately 54.2% of the total housing inventory as of late 2025.

In October 2025, the number of homeless people in the county was 72,195, of which 47,450 were unsheltered. LA County holds the undisputed title for the largest unsheltered homeless population in the nation—in 2024, only 30% of LA's homeless population was sheltered either in an emergency shelter, transitional housing, or a safe haven program, compared to 97% of New York's unhoused.

=== Religion ===
In 2015, there were over two thousand Christian churches, the majority of which are Catholic. Roman Catholic adherents number close to 40% of the population. There were 202 Jewish synagogues, 145 Buddhist temples, 38 Muslim mosques, 44 Baháʼí Faith worship centers, 37 Hindu temples, 28 Tenrikyo churches and fellowships, 16 Shinto worship centers, and 14 Sikh gurdwaras in the county. The Roman Catholic Archdiocese of Los Angeles has approximately 5 million members and is the largest diocese in the United States. In 2014, the county had 3,275 religious organizations, the most out of all US counties.

== Law, government, and politics ==
=== Government ===
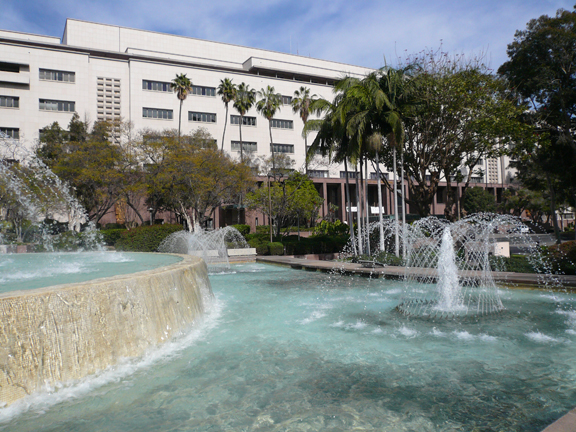
The Kenneth Hahn Hall of Administration is the seat of the government of Los Angeles County.

The Government of Los Angeles County is defined and authorized under the California Constitution, California law and the Charter of the County of Los Angeles. Much of the Government of California is in practice the responsibility of local governments such as the Government of Los Angeles County.

The county's voters elect a governing five-member Los Angeles County Board of Supervisors. The small size of the board means each supervisor represents over 2 million people. The board operates in a legislative, executive, and quasi-judicial capacity. As a legislative authority, it can pass ordinances for the unincorporated areas (ordinances that affect the whole county, like posting of restaurant ratings, must be ratified by the individual city). As an executive body, it can tell the county departments what to do, and how to do it. As a quasi-judicial body, the Board is the final venue of appeal in the local planning process, and holds public hearings on various agenda items.

As of 2020, the Board of Supervisors oversees a $35.5 billion annual budget and over 112,000 employees. The county government is managed on a day-to-day basis by a chief executive officer and is organized into many departments, each of which is enormous in comparison to equivalent county-level (and even many state-level) departments anywhere else in the United States. Some of the larger or better-known departments include:

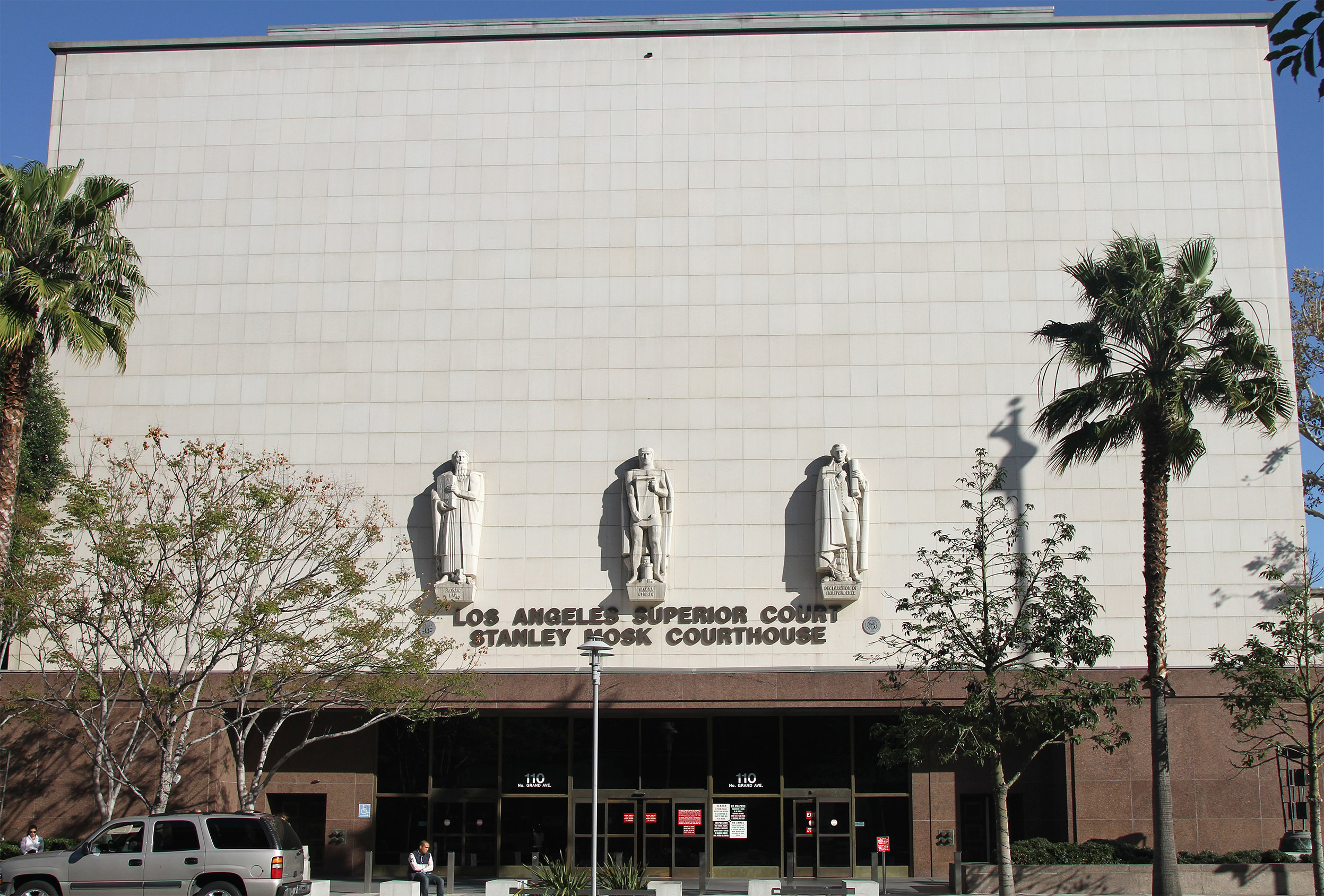
The Grand Avenue entrance of the Stanley Mosk Courthouse

- Los Angeles County Department of Consumer and Business Affairs – offers consumers in the county a variety of services including: consumer and real estate counseling, mediation, and small claims counseling investigates consumer complaints, real estate fraud and identity theft issues. The department also provides small business certifications and helps entrepreneurs navigate the process of opening a business.
- Los Angeles County Superior Court - The primary trial court for Los Angeles County, handling civil, criminal, family, and probate cases.
- Los Angeles County Department of Children and Family Services – administers foster care
- Los Angeles County Fire Department – provides firefighting and emergency medical services for the unincorporated parts and 58 cities of Los Angeles County, as well as for the city of La Habra in Orange County.
- Los Angeles County Department of Health Services – operates several county hospitals and a network of primary care clinics.
- Los Angeles County Department of Public Health – administers public health programs including STD programs, smoking cessation, and restaurant inspection. The cities of Long Beach and Pasadena have their own autonomous Public Health departments assuming county functions, and county public health orders are not applicable in those cities.
- Los Angeles County Department of Public Social Services – administers many federal and state welfare programs
- Los Angeles County Department of Public Works – operates countywide flood control system, constructs and maintains roads in unincorporated areas.
- Los Angeles County District Attorney – prosecutes criminal suspects.
- Los Angeles County Office of the Public Defender – defends indigent people accused of criminal offenses.
- Los Angeles County Probation Department
- Los Angeles County Sheriff's Department – provides law enforcement services for the unincorporated parts of Los Angeles County, as well as 42 cities.

The Los Angeles County Metropolitan Transportation Authority, despite its name, is not a County department. Technically it is a state-mandated county transportation commission that also operates a large bus and rail system in the county.

=== Politics ===
United States presidential election results for Los Angeles County, California
Year	Republican / Whig		Democratic		Third party(ies)	
Year	No.	%	No.	%	No.	%
1852	496	46.36%	574	53.64%	0	0.00%
1856	521	37.84%	721	52.36%	135	9.80%
1860	352	20.44%	475	27.58%	895	51.97%
1864	555	42.73%	744	57.27%	0	0.00%
1868	748	37.70%	1,236	62.30%	0	0.00%
1872	1,311	47.24%	1,228	44.25%	236	8.50%
1876	3,041	45.59%	3,615	54.20%	14	0.21%
1880	2,914	47.90%	2,853	46.90%	316	5.19%
1884	5,595	51.67%	4,683	43.24%	551	5.09%
1888	13,805	54.64%	10,110	40.02%	1,349	5.34%
1892	10,226	44.89%	8,119	35.64%	4,434	19.47%
1896	16,891	49.62%	16,043	47.13%	1,108	3.25%
1900	19,200	55.10%	13,158	37.76%	2,490	7.15%
1904	32,507	66.50%	10,030	20.52%	6,346	12.98%
1908	41,483	56.77%	22,076	30.21%	9,518	13.02%
1912	2,181	1.32%	55,110	33.34%	108,005	65.34%
1916	135,554	50.59%	114,070	42.58%	18,297	6.83%
1920	178,117	69.10%	55,661	21.59%	23,992	9.31%
1924	299,675	65.51%	33,554	7.33%	124,228	27.16%
1928	513,526	70.22%	209,945	28.71%	7,830	1.07%
1932	373,738	38.55%	554,476	57.19%	41,380	4.27%
1936	357,401	31.62%	757,351	67.00%	15,663	1.39%
1940	574,266	40.58%	822,718	58.13%	18,285	1.29%
1944	666,441	42.68%	886,252	56.75%	8,871	0.57%
1948	804,232	46.51%	812,690	47.00%	112,160	6.49%
1952	1,278,407	56.21%	971,408	42.71%	24,725	1.09%
1956	1,260,206	55.38%	1,007,887	44.29%	7,331	0.32%
1960	1,302,661	49.45%	1,323,818	50.25%	8,020	0.30%
1964	1,161,067	42.52%	1,568,300	57.43%	1,551	0.06%
1968	1,266,480	47.65%	1,223,251	46.02%	168,251	6.33%
1972	1,549,717	54.75%	1,189,977	42.04%	90,676	3.20%
1976	1,174,926	47.78%	1,221,893	49.69%	62,258	2.53%
1980	1,224,533	50.18%	979,830	40.15%	235,822	9.66%
1984	1,424,113	54.50%	1,158,912	44.35%	29,889	1.14%
1988	1,239,716	46.88%	1,372,352	51.89%	32,603	1.23%
1992	799,607	29.04%	1,446,529	52.54%	507,267	18.42%
1996	746,544	30.96%	1,430,629	59.34%	233,841	9.70%
2000	871,930	32.35%	1,710,505	63.47%	112,719	4.18%
2004	1,076,225	35.60%	1,907,736	63.10%	39,319	1.30%
2008	956,425	28.82%	2,295,853	69.19%	65,970	1.99%
2012	885,333	27.83%	2,216,903	69.69%	78,831	2.48%
2016	769,743	22.41%	2,464,364	71.76%	200,201	5.83%
2020	1,145,530	26.86%	3,028,885	71.03%	89,950	2.11%
2024	1,189,862	31.91%	2,417,109	64.82%	122,118	3.27%

==== Voter registration ====
Population and registered voters (Sept. 2025)
Total population	9,757,179	
Registered voters (Note: Percentage of registered voters with respect to total population. Percentages of party members with respect to registered voters follow.)	5,834,380	59.8%
Democratic	2,988,634	51.2%
Republican	1,098,884	18.8%
Democratic–Republican spread	+1,889,750	+32.4%
American Independent	200,191	3.4%
Libertarian	48,197	0.8%
Peace and Freedom	43,165	0.7%
Green	28,444	0.5%
Unknown	32,209	0.5%
Other	45,961	0.8%
No party preference	1,348,695	23.1%

In the United States House of Representatives, Los Angeles County is split between 17 congressional districts. In the California State Senate, Los Angeles County is split between 13 legislative districts. In the California State Assembly, Los Angeles County is split between 24 legislative districts.

On November 4, 2008, Los Angeles County was almost evenly split over Proposition 8, which amended the California Constitution to ban same-sex marriages. The county voted for the amendment 50.04% with a margin of 2,385 votes.

=== Legal system ===
The Los Angeles County Superior Court is the county's court of general jurisdiction, while the U.S. District Court for the Central District of California may hear cases where federal jurisdiction is present. Both are headquartered in a large cluster of government buildings in the city's Civic Center.

Historically, the courthouses were county-owned buildings that were maintained at county expense, which created significant friction since the trial court judges, as officials of the state government, had to lobby the county Board of Supervisors for facility renovations and upgrades. In turn, the state judiciary successfully persuaded the state Legislature to authorize the transfer of all courthouses to the state government in 2008 and 2009 (so that judges would have direct control over their own courthouses). Courthouse security is still provided by the county government under a contract with the state.

Unlike the largest city in the United States, New York City, all of the city of Los Angeles and most of its important suburbs are located within a single county. As a result, both the county superior court and the federal district court are respectively the busiest courts of their type in the nation.

Many celebrities have been seen in Los Angeles courts. In 2003, the television show Extra (based in nearby Glendale) found itself running so many reports on the legal problems of local celebrities that it spun them off into a separate show, Celebrity Justice.

State cases are appealed to the Court of Appeal for the Second Appellate District, which is also headquartered in the Civic Center, and then to the California Supreme Court, which is headquartered in San Francisco but also hears argument in Los Angeles (again, in the Civic Center). Federal cases are appealed to the Court of Appeals for the Ninth Circuit, which hears them at its branch building in Pasadena. The court of last resort for federal cases is the U.S. Supreme Court in Washington, D.C.

== Crime ==
The following table includes the number of incidents reported and the rate per 1,000 persons for each type of offense.

Population and crime rates (2011)
Population	9,787,747	
Violent crime	54,747	5.59
Homicide	699	0.07
Forcible rape	2,114	0.22
Robbery	24,528	2.51
Aggravated assault	27,406	2.80
Property crime	155,583	15.90
Burglary	50,558	5.17
Larceny-theft (Note: Only larceny-theft cases involving property over $400 in value are reported as property crimes.)	144,589	14.77
Motor vehicle theft	46,710	4.77
Arson	2,815	0.29

=== Cities by population and crime rates ===
Cities by population and crime rates (2012)
City	Population	Violent crimes	Violent crime rate per 1,000 persons	Property crimes	Property crime rate per 1,000 persons
Agoura Hills	20,667	12	0.58	236	11.42
Alhambra	84,469	149	1.76	1,919	22.72
Arcadia	57,295	57	0.99	1,388	24.23
Artesia	16,793	60	3.57	262	15.60
Avalon	3,795	13	3.43	64	16.86
Azusa	47,111	220	4.67	1,204	25.56
Baldwin Park	76,644	261	3.41	1,585	20.68
Bell	36,062	225	6.24	662	18.36
Bellflower	77,886	304	3.90	1,802	23.14
Bell Gardens	42,769	125	2.92	728	17.02
Beverly Hills	34,677	89	2.57	1,081	31.17
Bradbury	1,067	0	0.00	10	9.37
Burbank	105,057	243	2.31	2,493	23.73
Calabasas	23,442	13	0.55	238	10.15
Carson	93,233	520	5.58	2,709	29.06
Cerritos	49,856	120	2.41	1,870	37.51
Claremont	35,469	40	1.13	901	25.40
Commerce	13,035	112	8.59	1,010	77.48
Compton	98,057	1,218	12.42	2,399	24.47
Covina	48,588	151	3.11	1,651	33.98
Cudahy	24,201	151	6.24	347	14.34
Culver City	39,528	179	4.53	1,760	44.53
Diamond Bar	56,470	55	0.97	952	16.86
Downey	113,628	381	3.35	3,537	31.13
Duarte	21,673	71	3.28	507	23.39
El Monte	115,356	395	3.42	2,230	19.33
El Segundo	16,931	38	2.24	595	35.14
Gardena	59,802	287	4.80	1,321	22.09
Glendale	194,902	233	1.20	3,043	15.61
Glendora	50,903	59	1.16	1,293	25.40
Hawaiian Gardens	14,493	69	4.76	193	13.32
Hawthorne	85,692	637	7.43	2,181	25.45
Hermosa Beach	19,830	54	2.72	678	34.19
Hidden Hills	1,887	0	0.00	4	2.12
Huntington Park	59,079	373	6.31	1,917	32.45
Industry	222	68	306.31	1,110	5,000.00
Inglewood	111,488	780	7.00	2,673	23.98
Irwindale	1,447	15	10.37	243	167.93
La Canada Flintridge	20,584	12	0.58	324	15.74
La Habra Heights	5,413	6	1.11	44	8.13
Lakewood	81,382	227	2.79	2,062	25.34
La Mirada	49,312	98	1.99	776	15.74
Lancaster	159,155	859	5.40	3,498	21.98
La Puente	40,479	121	2.99	521	12.87
La Verne	31,575	50	1.58	823	26.06
Lawndale	33,312	167	5.01	397	11.92
Lomita	20,591	95	4.61	391	18.99
Long Beach	469,893	2,705	5.76	14,131	30.07
Los Angeles	3,855,122	18,547	4.81	87,478	22.69
Lynwood	70,908	541	7.63	1,373	19.36
Malibu	12,854	15	1.17	329	25.60
Manhattan Beach	35,719	62	1.74	855	23.94
Maywood	27,850	175	6.28	286	10.27
Monrovia	37,199	81	2.18	948	25.48
Montebello	63,538	146	2.30	1,775	27.94
Monterey Park	61,270	75	1.22	1,022	16.68
Norwalk	107,295	433	4.04	2,609	24.32
Palmdale	155,294	812	5.23	3,393	21.85
Palos Verdes Estates	13,661	6	0.44	136	9.96
Paramount	54,997	244	4.44	1,536	27.93
Pasadena	139,382	433	3.11	3,379	24.24
Pico Rivera	63,988	261	4.08	1,780	27.82
Pomona	151,511	1,021	6.74	5,055	33.36
Rancho Palos Verdes	42,335	35	0.83	498	11.76
Redondo Beach	67,856	190	2.80	1,596	23.52
Rolling Hills	1,891	0	0.00	27	14.28
Rolling Hills Estates	8,202	9	1.10	129	15.73
Rosemead	54,656	143	2.62	913	16.70
San Dimas	33,923	51	1.50	668	19.69
San Fernando	24,039	77	3.20	380	15.81
San Gabriel	40,376	88	2.18	550	13.62
San Marino	13,364	13	0.97	183	13.69
Santa Clarita	179,248	342	1.91	2,742	15.30
Santa Fe Springs	16,492	99	6.00	1,272	77.13
Santa Monica	91,215	395	4.33	3,398	37.25
Sierra Madre	11,098	4	0.36	112	10.09
Signal Hill	11,198	43	3.84	536	47.87
South El Monte	20,452	88	4.30	399	19.51
South Gate	95,966	553	5.76	2,545	26.52
South Pasadena	26,045	27	1.04	443	17.01
Temple City	36,148	38	1.05	354	9.79
Torrance	147,851	190	1.29	2,690	18.19
Vernon	114	27	236.84	311	2,728.07
Walnut	29,658	37	1.25	382	12.88
West Covina	107,861	281	2.61	3,224	29.89
West Hollywood	34,971	338	9.67	1,642	46.95
Westlake Village	8,406	3	0.36	154	18.32
Whittier	86,740	247	2.85	2,502	28.84

=== Other statistics ===
Crime in 2013

- Homicides: 386
- Thefts: 54,971
- Burglaries: 17,606
- Car Thefts: 15,866
- Robberies: 10,202
- Violent Crimes: 20,318
- Rapes: 843
- Assaults: 8,976
- Murders: 297

== Ecology ==
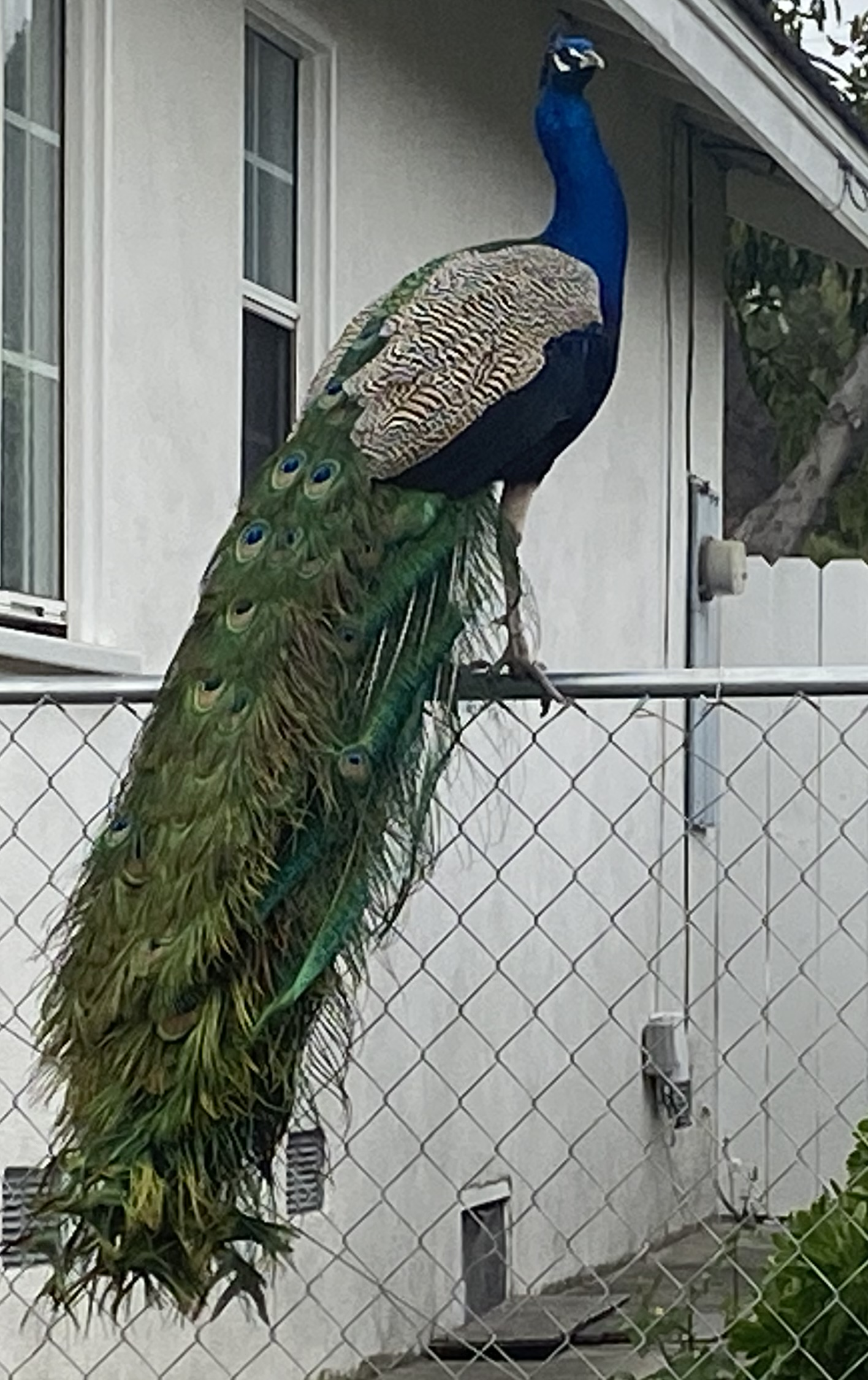
Many introduced species, such as this Indian peafowl, adapt readily to urban living and Los Angeles County's mild climate.

According to the authors of Wild L.A., a book about urban biodiversity, "Los Angeles is the birdiest county in the country with over 500 recorded species." LA's amenable climate supports a large number of introduced, tropical and migratory species, such as tropical parrots that snack on the local ornamental and edible fruit trees, including dates, figs, and loquats. Because of the county's wide range of biomes it is possible to see desert bighorn sheep and green sea turtles in the same day, without crossing the county line. The range of habitats in the county is "greater than in many states, with mountains, wetlands, desert, ocean, meadows and chaparral, each with its own endemic species." There are at least 100 species of trees, and 1000 species of non-native plants, in the urban areas of the county. Charismatic biodiversity indicator species native to the area include three species of amphibian (Baja California chorus frog, black-bellied slender salamander, western toad), 14 species of bird (acorn woodpecker, California quail, canyon wren, cinnamon teal, great blue heron, great horned owl, greater roadrunner, hooded merganser, Northern harrier, red-tailed hawk, red-winged blackbird, spotted towhee, western bluebird, western meadowlark), nine kinds of invertebrates (Behr's metalmark, bramble green hairstreak, bumblebees, El Segundo blue butterfly, harvester ants, Lorquin's admiral, North American Jerusalem crickets, Sara orangetip, velvet ants), five mammals (bobcat, dusky footed woodrat, gray fox, mountain lion, mule deer), and six reptiles (California kingsnake, coachwhip snake, gopher snake, side-blotched lizard, western pond turtle, western rattlesnake). Any observations of these species within the county are considered ecologically significant indicators of ecosystem health and may be documented using the iNaturalist app.

== Economy ==
Employment by industry in Los Angeles County (2015)

Los Angeles County is commonly associated with the entertainment and digital media industry; all five major film studios—Paramount Pictures, Sony Pictures, Warner Bros., Universal Pictures, and Walt Disney Studios—are located within the county. Numerous other major industries also define the economy of Los Angeles County, including international trade supported by the Port of Los Angeles and the Port of Long Beach, music recording and production, aerospace and defense, fashion, and professional services such as law, medicine, engineering and design services, financial services. High-tech sector employment within Los Angeles County is 368,500 workers, and manufacturing employment within Los Angeles County is 365,000 workers. Despite a business exodus from Downtown Los Angeles since the COVID-19 pandemic, the city's urban core is evolving as a cultural center with the world's largest showcase of architecture designed by Frank Gehry.

The following major companies have headquarters in Los Angeles County:

- Beverly Hills
  - Endeavor
  - Live Nation Entertainment, Inc
  - Metro-Goldwyn-Mayer
- Burbank
  - Walt Disney Co
  - Deluxe Entertainment Services Group
  - Warner Bros.
- Cerritos
  - CareMore
  - Isuzu Motors America
  - Memorex
  - RazorUSA
- El Segundo
  - Konami
  - Mattel, Inc
- Glendale
  - Avery Dennison Corp.
- City of Industry
  - Lee Kum Kee
- Irwindale
  - Huy Fong Foods
- La Mirada
  - Makita
- Los Angeles
  - AECOM
  - CBRE Group
  - Dollar Shave Club
  - Fandango, Inc.
  - Farmers Insurance Group
  - Herbalife
  - The Honest Company
  - ICANN
  - Paramount Skydance Corporation
  - Reliance Steel & Aluminum Co.
  - Universal Pictures
- Long Beach
  - Molina Healthcare
- Monrovia
  - Trader Joe's
- Palmdale
  - Delta Scientific
- Rosemead
  - Edison International
  - Panda Express
- Santa Clarita
  - Princess Cruise Lines
  - Honda Racing
- Santa Monica
  - Activision Blizzard
  - Hulu
  - Riot Games
  - Snap Inc.
  - TrueCar
  - Universal Music Group
- Torrance
  - American Honda Motor Co.
- Westlake Village
  - Dole Food Company
- Woodland Hills
  - Farmers Insurance Exchange
  - Health Net Inc.
  - Panavision

== Education ==
The Los Angeles County Office of Education provides a supporting role for school districts in the area. The county office also operates two magnet schools, the International Polytechnic High School and Los Angeles County High School for the Arts. There are a number of private schools in the county, most notably those operated by the Roman Catholic Archdiocese. The county's public education sector is run by numerous school districts with the Los Angeles Unified School District being the largest one running public schools primarily within the city of Los Angeles and its immediately neighboring cities.

=== Colleges ===
- Antelope Valley College, Lancaster
- Art Center College of Design, Pasadena
- The Art Institute of California – Los Angeles (AICALA), Santa Monica
- Azusa Pacific University, Azusa
- Biola University, La Mirada
- California Institute of the Arts, Santa Clarita
- Cerritos College, Norwalk
- Citrus College, Glendora
- Claremont Colleges, Claremont
  - Claremont McKenna College
  - Harvey Mudd College
  - Pitzer College
  - Pomona College
  - Scripps College
- Claremont School of Theology, Claremont
- College of the Canyons, Santa Clarita
- DeVry University, Long Beach and West Hills (Los Angeles)
- East Los Angeles College, Monterey Park
- El Camino College, Torrance
- Fuller Theological Seminary, Pasadena
- Glendale Community College, Glendale
- Hebrew Union College, Los Angeles
- ITT Technical Institute, Culver City, San Dimas, Sylmar (Los Angeles), Torrance, and West Covina
- Life Pacific College, San Dimas
- Long Beach City College, Long Beach
- Los Angeles City College (LACC), Los Angeles
- Los Angeles Harbor College, Los Angeles
- Los Angeles Mission College, Sylmar (Los Angeles)
- Los Angeles Music Academy College of Music, Pasadena
- Los Angeles Pierce College (Pierce), Woodland Hills (Los Angeles)
- Los Angeles Southwest College, Los Angeles
- Los Angeles Trade Technical College (LATTC), Los Angeles
- Los Angeles Valley College, Valley Glen (Los Angeles)
- The Master's University, Santa Clarita
- Mount Saint Mary's University, Los Angeles
- Mt. San Antonio College, Walnut
- Mt. Sierra College, Monrovia
- Occidental College (Oxy), Eagle Rock (Los Angeles)
- Otis College of Art and Design, Westchester (Los Angeles)
- Pacific Oaks College, Pasadena
- Pasadena City College, Pasadena
- Pepperdine University, Malibu
- Rio Hondo College, Whittier
- Santa Monica College (SMC), Santa Monica
- West Los Angeles College, Culver City
- Whittier College, Whittier
- Wyoming Technical Institute (WyoTech), Long Beach

=== Universities ===
- Abraham Lincoln University (ALU), Los Angeles
- Alliant International University (AIU), Alhambra
- American Jewish University (AJULA), Los Angeles
- Azusa Pacific University, Azusa
- Biola University, La Mirada
- California Institute of Technology (Caltech), Pasadena
- California State Polytechnic University, Pomona (Cal Poly Pomona), Pomona
- California State University, Dominguez Hills (CSUDH), Carson
- California State University, Long Beach (CSULB), Long Beach
- California State University, Los Angeles (CSULA), Los Angeles
- California State University, Northridge (CSUN), Northridge (Los Angeles)
- Charles R. Drew University of Medicine and Science (Los Angeles)
- Claremont Graduate University (CGU), Claremont
- Loyola Marymount University (LMU), Westchester (Los Angeles)
- National University, Los Angeles and Woodland Hills
- Pepperdine University, Malibu
- Southern California University of Health Sciences, Whittier
- Southern California Institute of Architecture (SCI-Arc), Los Angeles
- Southwestern University School of Law, Los Angeles
- University of Antelope Valley (UAV), Lancaster
- University of California, Los Angeles (UCLA), Westwood (Los Angeles)
- University of La Verne, La Verne
- University of Southern California (USC), Los Angeles
- University of the West (UWest), Rosemead
- Western University of Health Sciences (WesternU), Pomona
- Woodbury University, Burbank

== Sites of interest ==
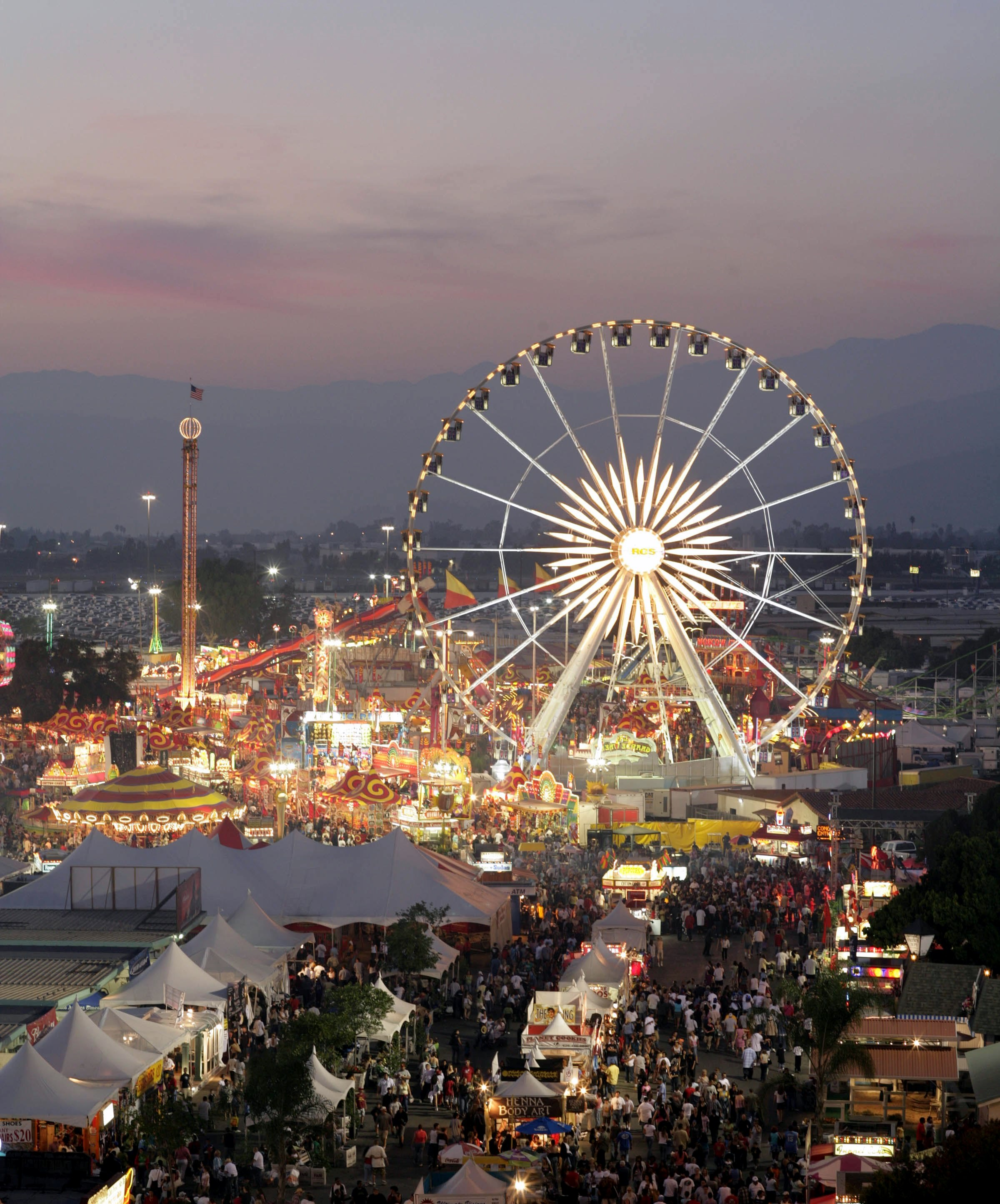
LA County Fair at dusk, 2008

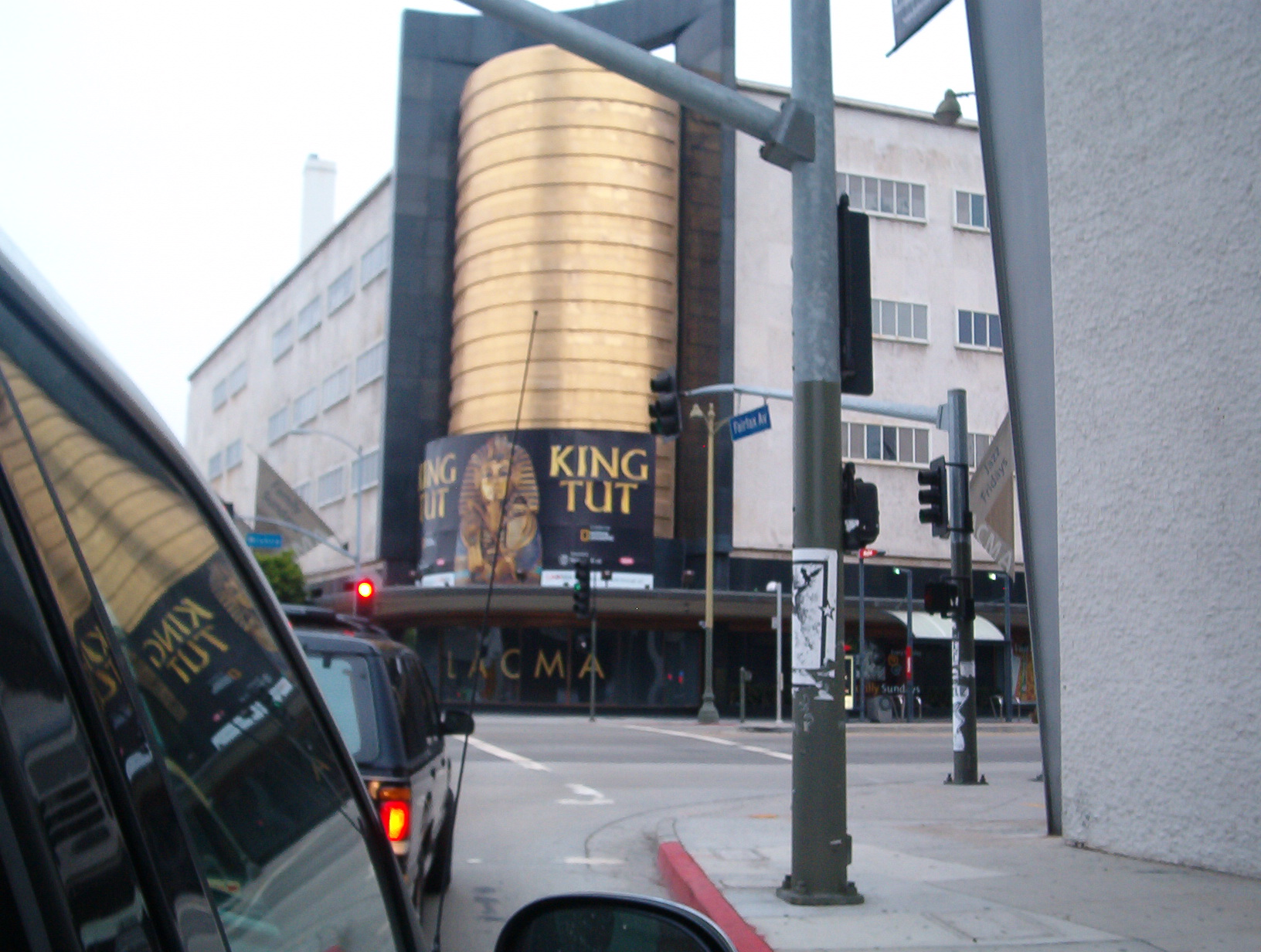
Photo of the Los Angeles County Museum of Art during its 2005 Ancient Egypt exhibit

The county's most visited park is Griffith Park, owned by the city of Los Angeles. The county is also known for the annual Rose Parade in Pasadena, the annual Los Angeles County Fair in Pomona, the Los Angeles County Museum of Art, the Los Angeles Zoo, the Natural History Museum of Los Angeles County, the La Brea Tar Pits, the Arboretum of Los Angeles, and two horse racetracks and two car racetracks (Pomona Raceway and Irwindale Speedway), also the RMS Queen Mary located in Long Beach, and the Long Beach Grand Prix, and miles of beaches—from Zuma to Cabrillo.

Venice Beach is a popular attraction whose Muscle Beach used to attract throngs of tourists admiring "hardbodies". Today, it is more arts-centered. Santa Monica's pier is a well known tourist spot, famous for its Ferris wheel and bumper car rides, which were featured in the introductory segment of the television sitcom Three's Company. Further north in Pacific Palisades one finds the beaches used in the television series Baywatch. The fabled Malibu, home of many film and television stars, lies west of it.

In the mountain, canyon, and desert areas one may find Vasquez Rocks Natural Area Park, where many old Westerns were filmed. Mount Wilson Observatory in the San Gabriel Mountains is open for the public to view astronomical stars from its telescope, now computer-assisted. Many county residents find relaxation in water skiing and swimming at Castaic Lake Recreation Area – the county's largest park by area – as well as enjoying natural surroundings and starry nights at Saddleback Butte State Park in the eastern Antelope Valley – California State Parks' largest in area within the county. The California Poppy Reserve is located in the western Antelope Valley and shows off the State's flower in great quantity on its rolling hills every spring.

=== Museums ===
- Academy Museum of Motion Pictures
- Armory Center for the Arts, Pasadena, California
- Battleship USS Iowa, Los Angeles Waterfront in San Pedro
- SS Lane Victory, Los Angeles Waterfront in San Pedro, just south of the USS Iowa
- California African American Museum
- California Science Center, Los Angeles (formerly the Museum of Science and Industry)
- The Broad
- Hammer Museum
- Huntington Library, San Marino
- Long Beach Museum of Art in the historic Elizabeth Milbank Anderson residence
- Los Angeles Children's Museum
- Los Angeles County Fire Museum, in Bellflower
- Los Angeles County Museum of Art, Mid-City, Los Angeles
- Lucas Museum of Narrative Art
- Museum of Contemporary Art, Downtown Los Angeles (founded in 1950); The Geffen Contemporary at MOCA, Downtown Los Angeles (founded in 1980)
- Museum of Jurassic Technology, Culver City
- Museum of Latin American Art in Long Beach
- Museum of Neon Art
- Museum of the American West (Gene Autry Museum), in Griffith Park
- Museum of Tolerance
- Natural History Museum of Los Angeles County
- Pasadena Museum of California Art, in Pasadena
- J. Paul Getty Center, Brentwood (Ancient Roman, Greek, and European Renaissance Art)
- J. Paul Getty Villa, Pacific Palisades, Getty's original house
- George C. Page Museum at La Brea Tar Pits
- Santa Monica Museum of Art, Santa Monica (Contemporary art)
- Norton Simon Museum, Pasadena (19th- and early 20th-century art)
- Skirball Cultural Center, Los Angeles
- Southwest Museum

=== Entertainment ===
- Los Angeles Memorial Coliseum
- Descanso Gardens
- Dodger Stadium
- Exposition Park
- Farmers Market
- The Forum
- Griffith Park
- Griffith Observatory
- Huntington Botanical Gardens
- La Brea Tar Pits
- Music Center
- Olvera Street
- Crypto.com Arena
- SoFi Stadium
- South Coast Botanic Garden
- Third Street Promenade
- Venice Beach
- Los Angeles Zoo
- Santa Fe Dam Recreation Area

=== Music venues ===
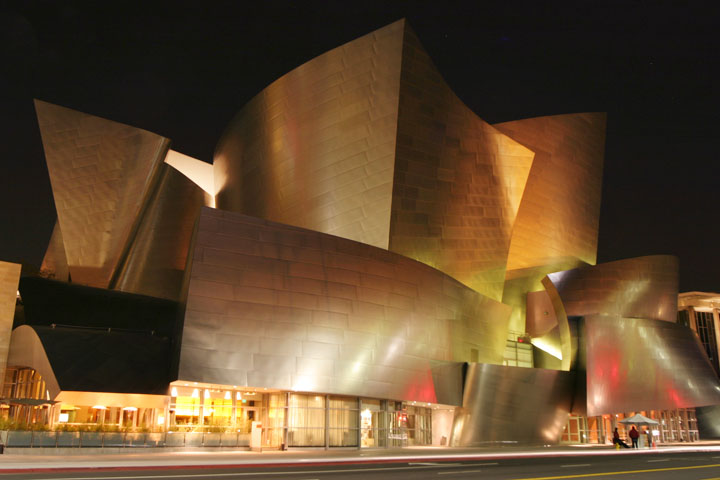
Walt Disney Concert Hall

- California Plaza, comprising One California Plaza and Two California Plaza
- Cerritos Center for the Performing Arts
- Crypto.com Arena
- The Forum
- Walt Disney Concert Hall
- Greek Theatre
- House of Blues Sunset Strip
- Pantages Theatre
- Hollywood Bowl
- Hollywood Palladium
- John Anson Ford Amphitheatre
- The Orpheum Theatre
- The Roxy Theatre
- Royce Hall (UCLA)
- The Music Box
- El Rey Theatre
- The Troubadour
- The Wiltern
- Whisky a Go Go

=== Amusement parks ===
- Universal Studios Hollywood
- Raging Waters, San Dimas
- Six Flags Magic Mountain
- Six Flags Hurricane Harbor
- Pacific Park

=== Other attractions ===
- U.S. Bank Tower
- Wilshire Grand Tower
- Central Los Angeles Library
- Watts Towers
- Wayfarers Chapel
- Fo Guang Shan Hsi Lai Temple
- Cathedral of Our Lady of the Angels
- Queen Mary

=== Other areas ===
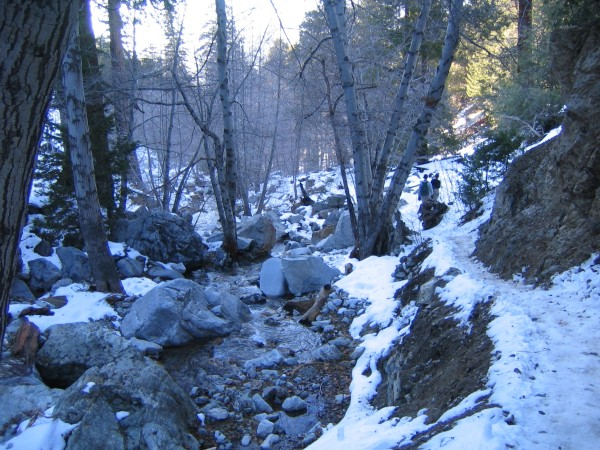
Angeles National Forest

- Ridge Route
- Angeles National Forest
- Mount Wilson Observatory
- Malibu Creek State Park
- Vasquez Rocks Natural Area Park
- Plant 42's Blackbird Airpark and Heritage Airpark
- Antelope Valley California Poppy Reserve
- Cortes Bank
- Santa Catalina Island
- Mojave Desert
- Saddleback Butte State Park
- Antelope Valley Indian Museum State Historic Park
- Arthur B. Ripley Desert Woodland State Park

== Transportation ==
=== Major highways ===
- I-5
  - I-5 BL (San Fernando Road)
- I-10
- I-105
- I-110 / SR 110 (Harbor Freeway / Arroyo Seco Parkway)
- I-210 / SR 210 (Foothill Freeway)
- I-405
- I-605
- I-710 / SR 710 – SR 710 is unsigned
- US 101
- SR 1 (Pacific Coast Highway)
- SR 2
- SR 14 – former US 6
- SR 18
- SR 19 / SR 164
- SR 22
- SR 23
- SR 27
- SR 39
- SR 47
- SR 57
- SR 60 – former US 60
- SR 66 (Foothill Boulevard) – former US 66
- SR 71
- SR 72
- SR 90
- SR 91 – former US 91
- SR 103
- SR 107
- SR 118
- SR 126
- SR 134
- SR 138
- SR 170
- SR 187
- SR 213

=== Air ===
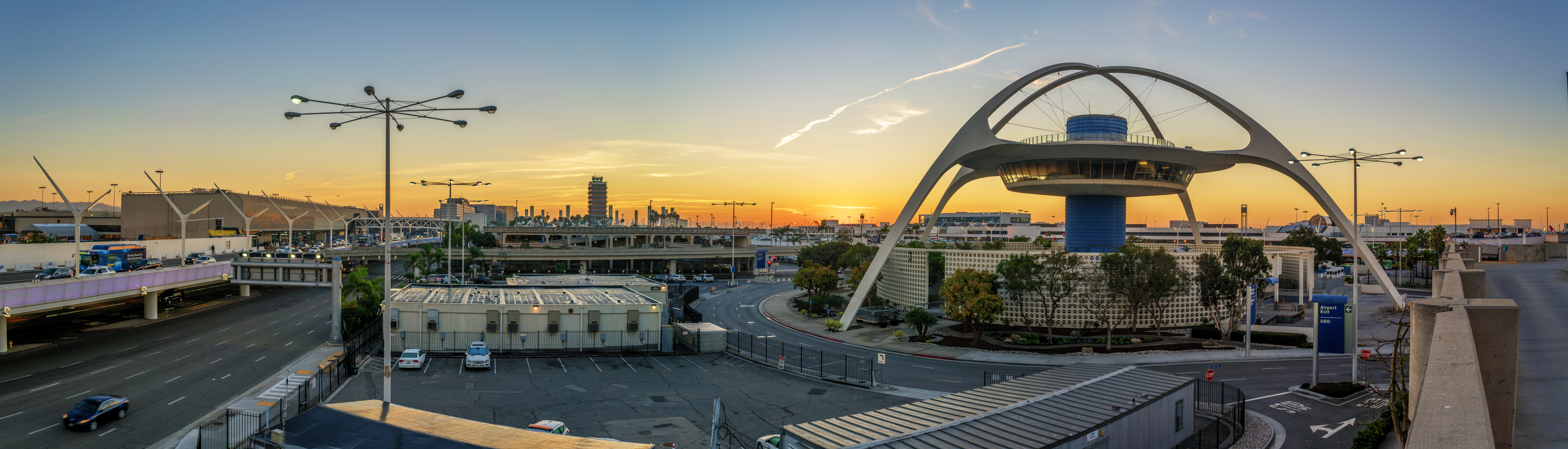
Los Angeles International Airport

Los Angeles International Airport (LAX), located in the Westchester district, is the primary commercial airport for commercial airlines in the county and the Greater Los Angeles Area. LAX is operated by Los Angeles World Airports (LAWA), an agency of the City of Los Angeles.

Other important commercial airports in Los Angeles County include:

- Long Beach Municipal Airport operated by the City of Long Beach.
- Hollywood Burbank Airport in Burbank, operated by the Burbank-Glendale-Pasadena Airport Authority.

The following general aviation airports also are located in Los Angeles County:

- County-operated airports (Department of Public Works, Aviation Division)
  - Compton/Woodley Airport in Compton.
  - San Gabriel Valley Airport in El Monte.
  - Brackett Field in La Verne.
  - Whiteman Airport in Pacoima.
  - General William J. Fox Airfield in Lancaster.
- City-operated airports
  - Van Nuys Airport in Van Nuys, also operated by LAWA. Van Nuys Airport sees significant executive jet air traffic.
  - LA/Palmdale Regional Airport in Palmdale. The airport is a separate facility on the grounds of Air Force Plant 42.
  - Santa Monica Airport in Santa Monica, which has major executive jet traffic.
  - Hawthorne Municipal Airport, also known as Jack Northrop Field, in Hawthorne.
  - Zamperini Field in Torrance.

The U.S. Air Force operates three airports in Los Angeles County:

- Portions of Edwards Air Force Base, located at the northern edge of the county.
- Air Force Plant 42 in Palmdale, sharing runways with LA/Palmdale Regional.
- The non-flying Los Angeles Air Force Base in El Segundo.

=== Rail ===
Los Angeles is a major freight-railroad transportation center, in great part due to the large volumes of freight moving in and out of the county's seaport facilities. The ports are connected to the downtown rail yards and to the main lines of Union Pacific and Burlington Northern Santa Fe headed east via a grade-separated freight rail corridor known as the Alameda Corridor.

Passenger rail service is provided in the county by Amtrak, Los Angeles Metro Rail and Metrolink.

Amtrak has the following intercity Amtrak service at Union Station in the city of Los Angeles:

- The Pacific Surfliner to Santa Barbara, San Luis Obispo, and San Diego.
- The Coast Starlight to San Francisco Bay Area, Portland and Seattle.
- The Southwest Chief to Albuquerque, Kansas City and Chicago.
- The Sunset Limited to Tucson, Houston and New Orleans.

Union Station is also the primary hub for Metrolink commuter rail, which serves much of the Greater Los Angeles Area.

Light rail, subway (heavy rail), and long-distance bus service are all provided by the Los Angeles County Metropolitan Transportation Authority (Metro). Other smaller regional transit agencies that provide public transit to specific regions of Los Angeles County include LADOT, Long Beach Transit, Montebello Bus Lines, Norwalk Transit, Santa Monica's Big Blue Bus serving the western LA region, Santa Clarita Transit, Torrance Transit, Glendale Beeline, Foothill Transit serving the San Gabriel Valley region, and the Antelope Valley Transit Authority serving the Lancaster and Palmdale area in the Antelope Valley region.

=== Sea ===
The county's two main seaports are the Port of Los Angeles and the Port of Long Beach. Together they handle over a quarter of all container traffic entering the United States, making the complex the largest and most important port in the country, and the third-largest port in the world by shipping volume.

The Port of Los Angeles is the largest cruise ship center on the West Coast, handling more than 1 million passengers annually.

The Port of Long Beach is home to the Sea Launch program, which uses a floating launch platform to insert payloads into orbits that would be difficult to attain from existing land-based launch sites.

Catalina Express ferries link the Catalina Island city of Avalon to the mainland at San Pedro and Long Beach, as well as Dana Point in Orange County.

== Water ==
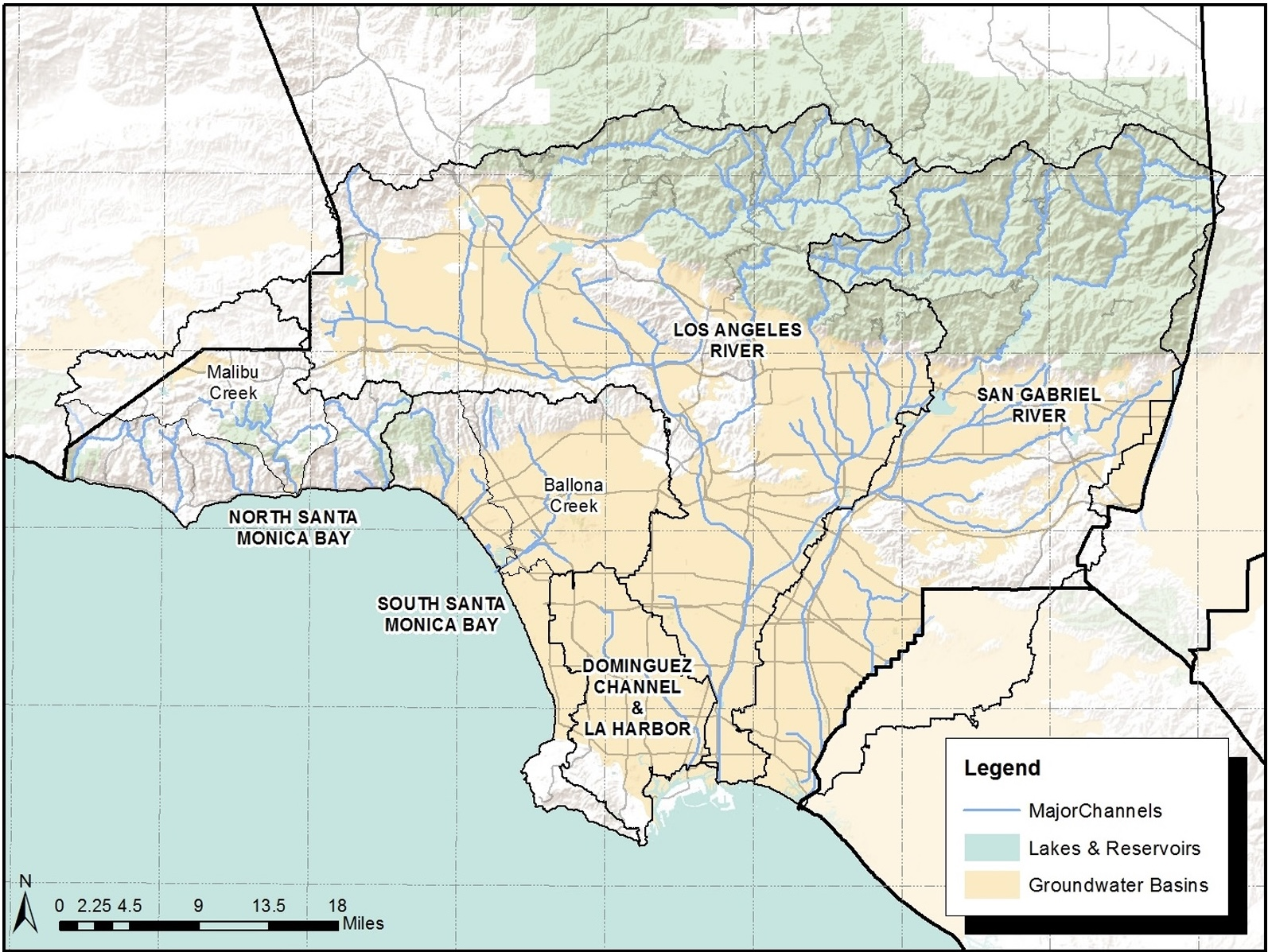
Watersheds of Los Angeles County

Water is provided by at least 200 independent water districts or agencies. Statewide droughts in California have placed a strain on the county's water security.

== Communities ==
=== Cities ===
There are 88 incorporated cities in Los Angeles County. According to the 2024 Estimate, the most populous are:

Largest cities, 2024 Estimate
City	Population
Los Angeles	3,878,704
Long Beach	450,901
Santa Clarita	229,159
Glendale	187,823
Lancaster	167,426
Palmdale	162,536
Pomona	147,966
Torrance	139,576
Pasadena	137,195
Downey	109,368
West Covina	106,920
El Monte	104,639
Burbank	103,533
Inglewood	102,774

=== Unincorporated areas ===
==== Census-designated places ====
- Acton
- Agua Dulce
- Alondra Park
- Altadena
- Avocado Heights
- Castaic
- Charter Oak
- Citrus
- Del Aire
- Desert View Highlands
- East Los Angeles
- East Pasadena
- East Rancho Dominguez
- East San Gabriel
- East Whittier
- Elizabeth Lake
- Florence-Graham
- Green Valley
- Hacienda Heights
- Hasley Canyon
- La Crescenta-Montrose
- Ladera Heights
- Lake Hughes
- Lake Los Angeles
- Lennox
- Leona Valley
- Littlerock
- Marina del Rey
- Mayflower Village
- North El Monte
- Pepperdine University
- Quartz Hill
- Rose Hills
- Rowland Heights
- San Pasqual
- South Monrovia Island
- South San Gabriel
- South San Jose Hills
- South Whittier
- Stevenson Ranch
- Sun Village
- Topanga
- Val Verde
- Valinda
- View Park-Windsor Hills
- Vincent
- Walnut Park
- West Athens
- West Carson
- West Rancho Dominguez
- West Puente Valley
- West Whittier-Los Nietos
- Westmont
- Willowbrook

==== Other unincorporated communities ====
- Agoura
- Alla
- Alpine
- Andrade Corner
- Antelope Acres
- Antelope Center
- Athens
- Bassett
- Big Pines
- Castaic Junction
- City Terrace
- Cornell
- Del Sur
- Del Valle
- Firestone Park
- Florence
- Gorman
- Hillgrove
- Hi Vista
- Juniper Hills
- Kagel Canyon
- Kinneloa Mesa
- Largo Vista
- Llano
- Los Nietos
- Malibu Vista
- Monte Nido
- Neenach
- Ninetynine Oaks
- Pearblossom
- Rancho Dominguez
- Sandberg
- Sand Canyon
- Seminole Hot Springs
- Three Points
- Two Harbors
- Universal City
- Valyermo
- West Whitter

==== Proposed communities ====
- Centennial (planned for 70,000).

See: Los Angeles Almanac MAP: Unincorporated Areas and Communities of Los Angeles County

== See also ==
- List of museums in Los Angeles
- List of museums in Los Angeles County, California
- List of school districts in Los Angeles County, California
- List of schools in the Roman Catholic Archdiocese of Los Angeles
- National Register of Historic Places listings in Los Angeles County, California
