= Sag pond =

Pond formed in an active fault zone

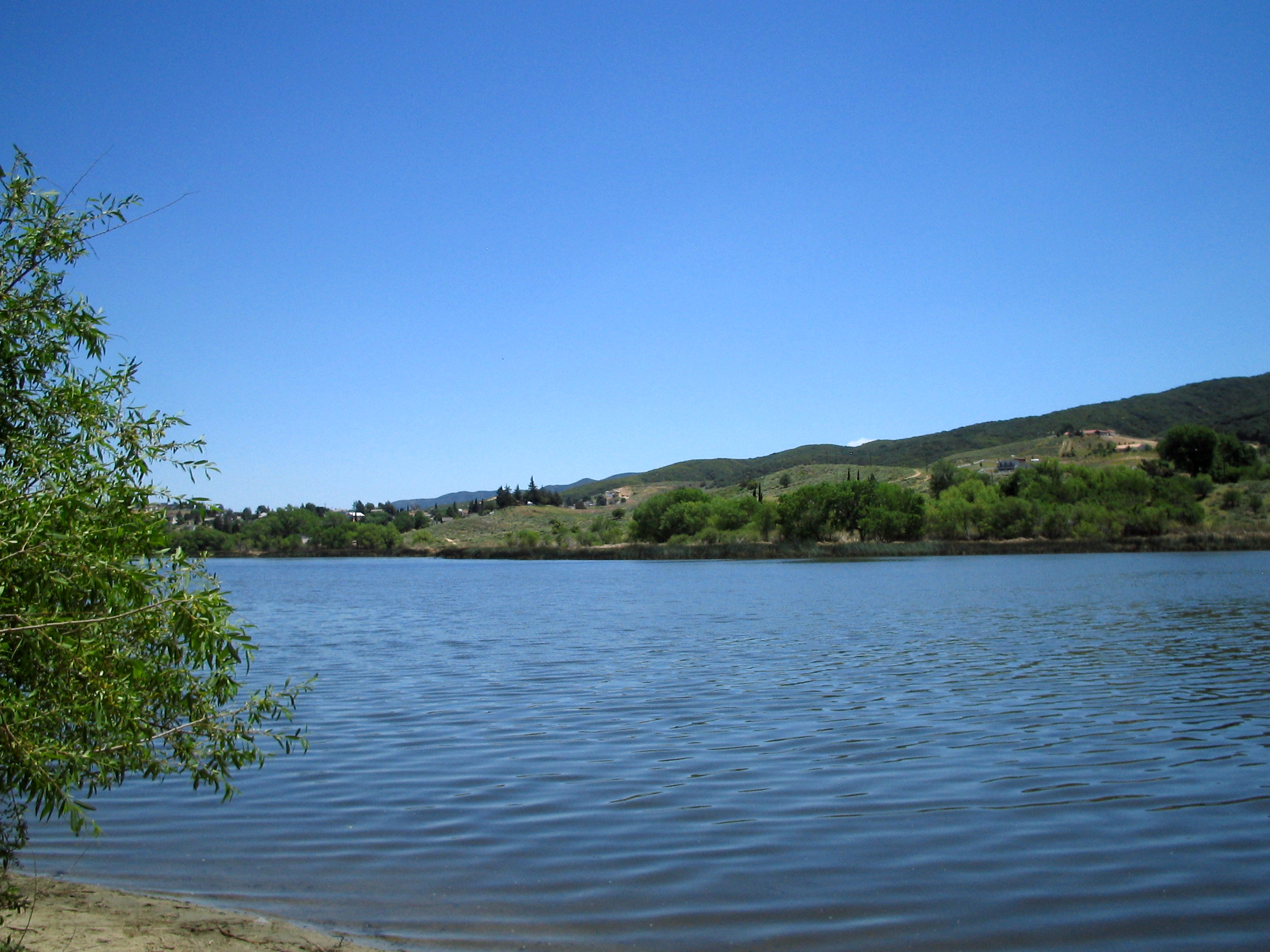
Elizabeth Lake is one of numerous sag ponds along the San Andreas Fault.

A sag pond is a body of fresh water collected in the lowest parts of a depression formed between two sides of an active strike-slip, transtensional or normal fault zone.

== Formation ==
A sag pond is formed along a strike-slip fault, which may create a depression in the earth. When water enters the depression from rivers, streams, rainfall or snowfall, it fills the low-lying area, and a pond is the result.

== Scientific significance ==
Sag pond formation is common in California, and many of them can be found on the San Andreas Fault, which runs through the western part of the state. Aerial photography or high-resolution topography can easily determine their locations.

== Uses ==
Sag ponds have been converted into stock reservoirs. Larger sag ponds are converted into reservoirs for public water sources, such as San Andreas Lake.

== Examples ==
Sag ponds of various sizes can be found along the San Andreas Fault, most notably within the Carrizo Plain and Sierra Pelona Mountains. Some have been converted into reservoirs like the San Andreas Reservoir near San Bruno, California. Various lagoons on the plateau of Pico Island in the Azores are the result of a graben.
