= Sierra Madre Dam =

- Location within California
- Country: United States
- Location: San Gabriel Mountains, California
- Coordinates: 34°10′34″N 118°02′34″W
- Purpose: Flood control
- Opening date: 1928; 98 years ago
- Owner: Los Angeles County Department of Public Works

Dam and spillways
- Type of dam: Arch dam
- Impounds: Little Santa Anita Creek
- Height: 69 feet (21 m)
- Length: 200 feet (61 m)
- Spillways: 1

The Sierra Madre Dam is a flood control structure located on Little Santa Anita Creek, at the mouth of Little Santa Anita Canyon in the San Gabriel Mountains of Los Angeles County, California. Positioned just south of the Angeles National Forest, the dam serves the community of Sierra Madre and contributes to regional flood mitigation efforts.

== History ==
As a result of the flood of 1914, which caused an estimated $10,000,000 in property damage, in the San Gabriel Valley, the California Legislature implemented The Los Angeles County Flood Control Act that entailed a systematic study for flood relief. Results showed an average of 60,000 acre feet of water, valuing between $500,00 to $1,000,000, being wasted from the San Gabriel Mountain watershed into the ocean that could otherwise be conserved and domestically used for nearly half a million people.

To address this issue, voters in 1924 approved a $35.3 million bond measure to fund the construction of a series of water conservation and flood control structures. This ambitious plan included the development of eight major dams: Thompson Creek, Big Dalton, San Gabriel, Big Santa Anita, Eaton Canyon, Big Tujunga, Pacoima, Puddingstone, and Sierra Madre. These dams were designed to not only control flooding but also to capture and store water for municipal use, marking a significant advancement in the region’s infrastructure for sustainable water management.

== Dam ==
The concrete arch dam has a height of 69 feet (21 m), and a width of 200 feet (61 m). Construction was completed in 1928. It is owned by Los Angeles County Department of Public Works. At the lower face of the dam, water can be released out of a steel grille covered 4 feet (1.2 m) diameter outlet onto a spillway, and then into channelized Little Santa Anita Creek.

In the 1940s, CCC—Civilian Conservation Corps workers built the concrete channel containing the creek, from the dam through adjacent Sierra Madre. They also constructed public street bridges and footbridges across the channel in the Sierra Madre Canyon neighborhood.

== Reservoir–debris basin ==
The dam's debris basin, when unfilled with sediment, and a small reservoir, can have a storage capacity of 51 acre-feet (63,000 m^{3}), and a normal surface area of 1 acre. Its surrounding perimeter watershed area is 0.77 square miles (2.0 km^{2}), with some slopes coated in gunnite. The upstream drainage basin for Little Santa Anita Creek is much larger.

Little Santa Anita Creek is a tributary of Santa Anita Creek, which is a tributary of the Rio Hondo at their confluence in Whittier Narrows. The Rio Hondo is a major tributary of the Los Angeles River.

The dam and debris basin–reservoir are used for flood and sediment control, and for downstream fish habitat protection.

== Access ==
Access to the dam is restricted by locked gates and chain link fencing across the public Sierra Madre Canyon neighborhood side.

To the west, on Mount Wilson Trail Road in the neighborhood, there is a trailhead for the historic Mount Wilson Trail, a hiking trail that climbs up through Little Santa Anita Canyon to reach Mount Wilson. Other trails, now within the Angeles National Forest, branch off it to the creek for canyoneering, and to other views and destinations. Waterfalls, including a 40-foot (12 m) tall one, are in the deep canyon above the dam.

== Environmental Considerations ==
The dam’s operation is carefully managed to balance flood control with environmental stewardship. Sediment removal activities are coordinated to minimize impact on downstream riparian habitats. Additionally, water releases are occasionally managed to support fish populations and maintain natural flow patterns.

== See also ==
- List of dams and reservoirs in California
