= Anita =

Anita or ANITA may refer to:

== Arts ==
- Anita (1967 film), an Indian film
- Anita (2009 film), an Argentine film
- Anita (2021 film), a Hong Kong film
- Anita: Swedish Nymphet, a 1973 erotic film

== People ==
- Anita (given name), people with the given name Anita
- Vurnon Anita (born 1989), Curaçaoan footballer

== Places ==
- Anita, Indiana, a former town in Johnson County, Indiana
- Anita, Iowa, city in Cass County, Iowa
- Anita, Pennsylvania
- Lake Anita State Park, state park in Cass County, Iowa, US
- Santa Anita (disambiguation)

== Science and technology ==
- Amblypodia anita, a species of blue butterfly
- ANITA grade, a group of plants consisting of the most basal angiosperm lineages
- Antarctic Impulsive Transient Antenna experiment
- Sumlock ANITA calculator
- Analysing Interferometer for Ambient Air, a monitoring system used on the International Space Station

== Storms ==
- Hurricane Anita, an Atlantic hurricane in 1977
- Tropical Storm Anita (disambiguation)

== See also ==
- Anita's Theatre, a venue in Thirroul, New South Wales, Australia
- Anitta (disambiguation)
- Annita
