= San Dimas =

San Dimas may refer to:

- San Dimas Municipality, Durango, Mexico
- San Dimas, California, United States
- San Dimas (reserve), a biosphere reserve and experimental forest in southern California
- San Dimas Dam, in California, United States
- San Dimas (guitar), model of electric guitar made by Charvel

== See also ==
- Saint Dismas or the penitent thief
