= Santa Anita Dam =

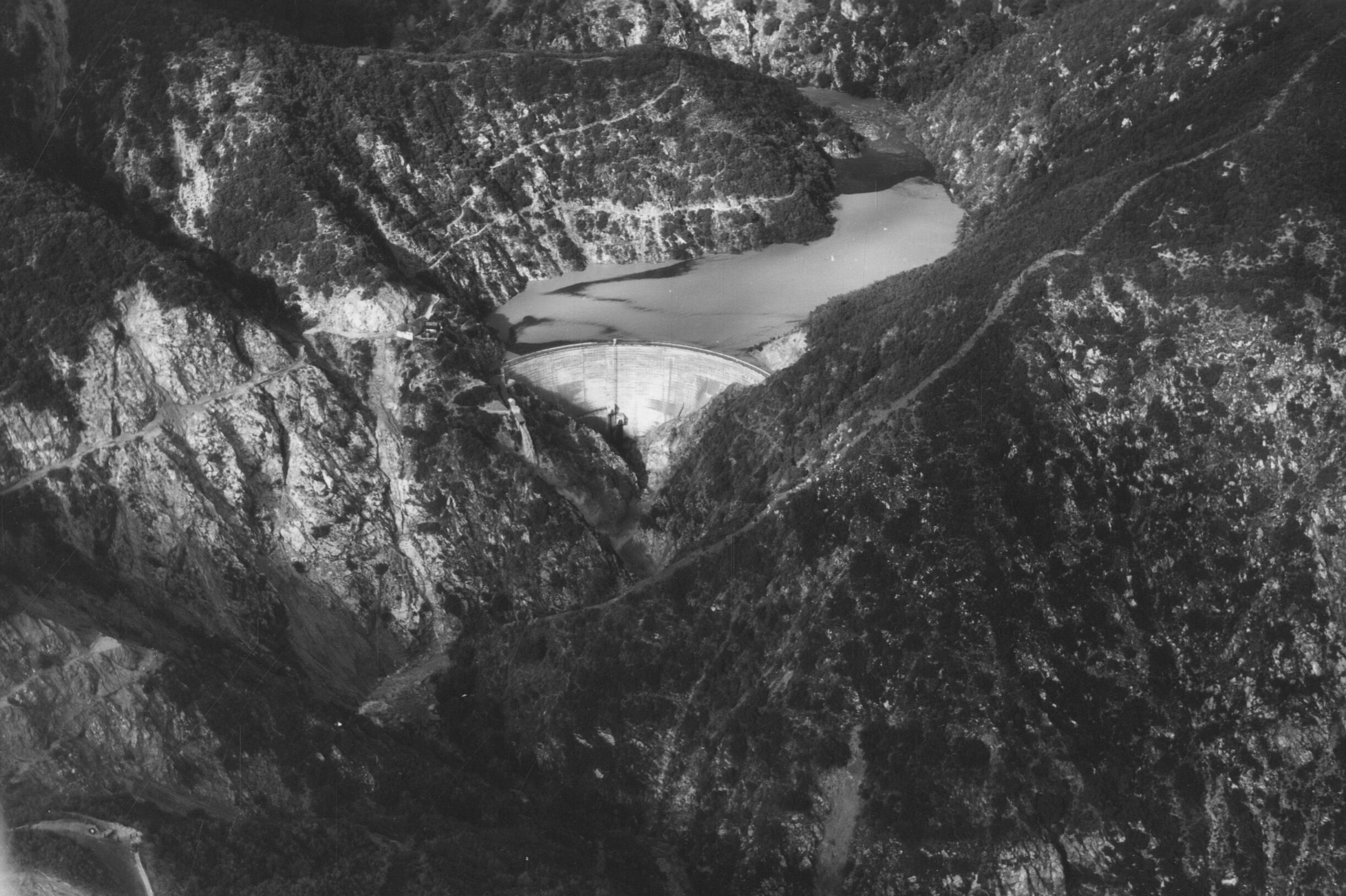
- Interactive map of Santa Anita Dam
- Location: Sierra Madre, California
- Coordinates: 34.1836164°N 118.0195111°W
- Construction began: 1924
- Opening date: 1927
- Construction cost: $17 million
- Owner: Los Angeles County Flood Control District

Dam and spillways
- Type of dam: Concrete thin arch
- Impounds: Santa Anita Creek
- Height: 225 ft (69 m)
- Length: 612 ft (187 m)
- Width (base): 61.5 ft (18.7 m)

Reservoir
- Creates: Santa Anita Reservoir
- Total capacity: 1,028 acre⋅ft (1,268,000 m^{3})
- Catchment area: 10.8 sq mi (28 km^{2})
- Surface area: 17 acres (6.9 ha)

Santa Anita Dam, also known as Big Santa Anita Dam, is a concrete thin arch dam on Santa Anita Creek in the San Gabriel Mountains of Los Angeles County, California. Owned by the Los Angeles County Flood Control District, the dam serves for flood control, water conservation and debris control. The dam is 225 feet (69 m) high and 612 feet (187 m) long, holding 858 acre-feet (1,058,000 m^{3}) of water with a maximum capacity of 1,028 acre⋅ft (1,268,000 m^{3}). The catchment area for the dam is 10.8 square miles (28 km^{2}). The dam was built between 1923 and 1927. The dam has three valves that control releases of stormwater.

The dam is situated in the steep San Gabriel foothills, north of Sierra Madre and Arcadia. It is located just north of the boundary of the Angeles National Forest. The dam is visible from Santa Anita Canyon Road, which runs along the west slope of the Santa Anita Canyon and provides access into trails further upstream along Santa Anita Creek. The viewing window for the dam is very short, only about a half-mile; the access road which runs down into the canyon from Santa Anita Canyon Road is closed to the public. However, the First Water trail, which leads downstream from Chantry Flat along the creek, is said to provide access to the reservoir.

Since the 1990s the maximum allowed storage of water has been restricted, to ensure that the dam will not collapse due to seismic instability. This has partially caused rapid silting of the reservoir and sediment removal was started in mid-2009. The reservoir was drained and about 6,750,000 cubic yards (5,160,000 m^{3}) of sediment were removed.

A staged rescue at the dam was broadcast in November 1958 as an episode of the syndicated U.S. television series Rescue 8 titled "The Chasm".
