= Walnut Creek (Southern California) =

Urban stream in California, United States

Coordinates: 34°03′33″N 118°00′19″W

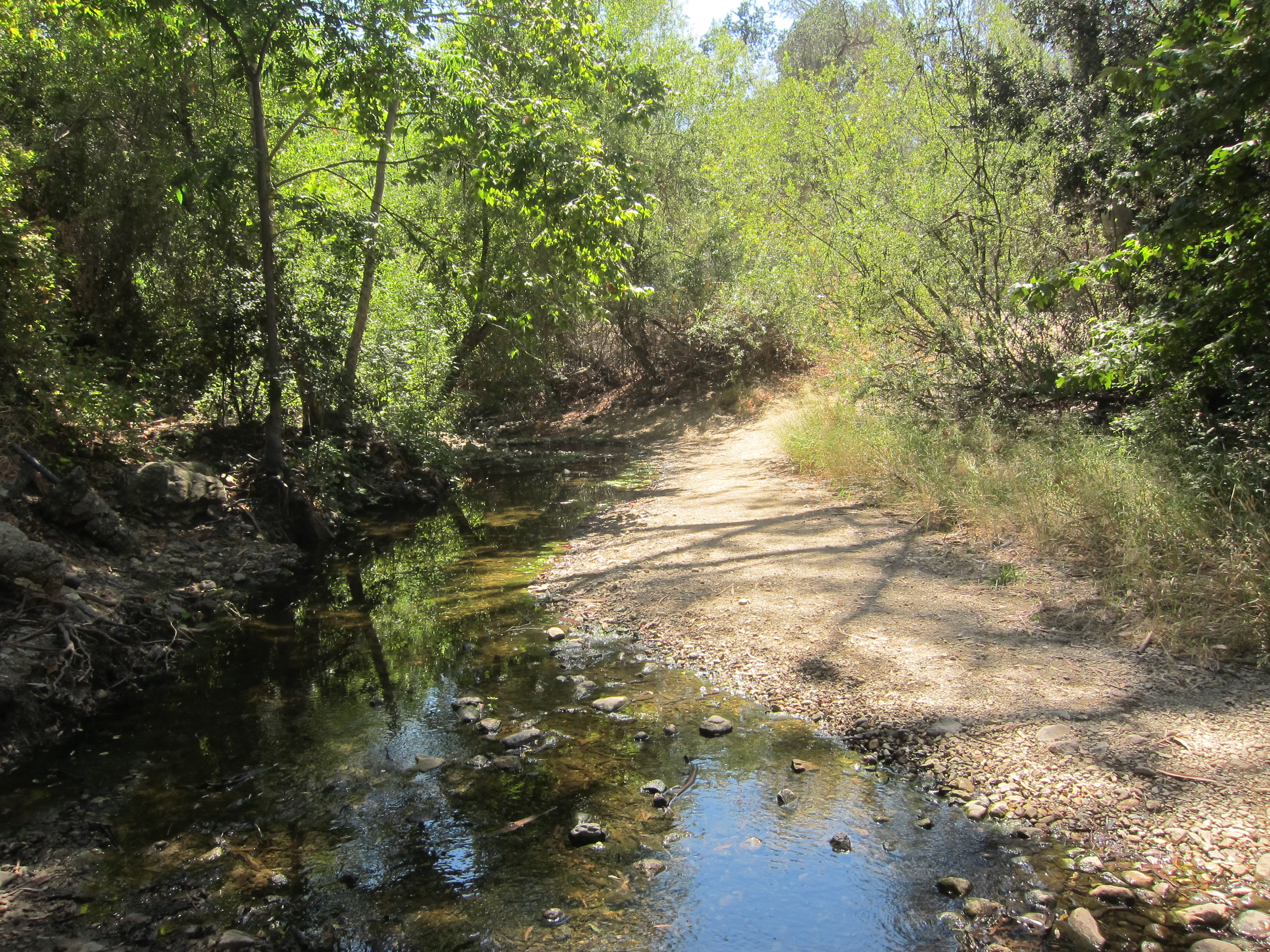
In Walnut Creek Park

Walnut Creek is an urban stream in the San Gabriel Valley of Southern California, and is a tributary of the San Gabriel River. The creek begins at the Puddingstone Dam of Puddingstone Reservoir in Frank G. Bonelli Regional Park and flows westward for about 13 miles (21 km), through San Dimas, Covina, West Covina and Baldwin Park, to join the San Gabriel River in El Monte.

The major tributaries of Walnut Creek are Live Oak Wash (which flows into Puddingstone Reservoir), Charter Oak Creek in Covina, Vine Creek in West Covina and the Big Dalton Wash. Live Oak Wash and Big Dalton Wash carry runoff from the San Gabriel Mountains and are prone to flooding due to heavy orographic precipitation events in winter. After devastating flooding in the early 20th century, the Los Angeles County Department of Public Works built Puddingstone Dam in 1928 and channelized Walnut Creek and most of its tributaries. However, the first 2 miles (3.2 km) of the creek, in Walnut Creek County Park near San Dimas, are free-flowing and run within a deep wooded canyon.

Walnut Creek is a perennial stream, with a significant portion of its flow made up of urban runoff. During dry summers, it provides most of the flow in the San Gabriel River below their confluence. This is due to diversion of the San Gabriel River upstream for groundwater recharge of the San Gabriel Valley aquifer. However, the creek can still dry up during years of particularly poor rainfall.

Raging Waters Los Angeles is located adjacent to Walnut Creek just below Puddingstone Dam.

== See also ==
- List of rivers of California
