= Santa Anita =

Santa Anita may refer to:

Places

- Little Santa Anita Canyon, a canyon in the San Gabriel Mountains, California
- Santa Anita metro station, a station on the Mexico City Metro
- Rancho Santa Anita, a 13,319-acre (53.90 km^{2}) land grant given to Hugo Reid
- Santa Anita, Baja California Sur, a village in Baja California del Sur, Mexico
- Santa Anita, California, a community in Los Angeles County
- Santa Anita Assembly Center, a temporary Detention Camp for Japanese Americans during World War II in Santa Anita, California
- Santa Anita Canyon, a canyon in the Angeles National Forest in California
- Santa Anita District, a district of the Lima Province in Peru
- Santa Anita Golf Course, in Los Angeles, California
- Santa Anita Park, a thoroughbred racetrack in Arcadia, California, United States
- Westfield Santa Anita, a shopping mall in Arcadia, California

Horse races

- Santa Anita Handicap a horse race run each March at Santa Anita Park in Arcadia, California
- Santa Anita Oaks, a horse race held annually in mid March at Santa Anita Park in Arcadia, California
- Santa Anita Derby, a horse race run each April at Santa Anita Park in Arcadia, California
