= Anitta =

Anitta may refer to:

- Anitta (king), Hittite king
- Anitta (singer) (born 1993), Brazilian singer
- Anitta Müller-Cohen (1890–1962), Austrian-born Israeli social worker, politician and writer

== See also ==
- Annita
- Anita (disambiguation)
