= Marie Riedeselle =

Canadian-born American bicyclist, dress designer, osteopath, hiker and hermit

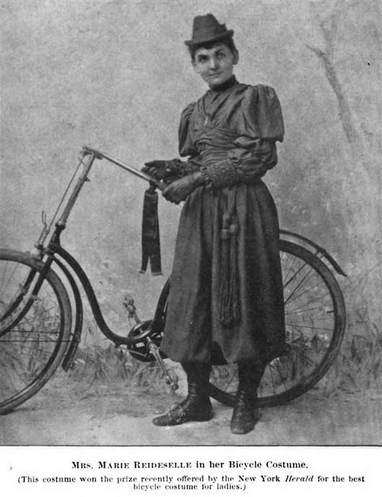
- Marie Riedeselle in her prize-winning bicycling costume, from an 1894 publication
- Born: Marie A. Landry; Montreal, Canada

Marie A. Riedeselle (née Landry, died April 26, 1915) was a Canadian-born American bicyclist, dress designer, osteopath, hiker and hermit.

== Early life and education ==
Riedeselle was born in Montreal and raised in New York state. She had a farm in Connecticut, and studied osteopathy in St. Louis, Missouri.

== Career ==
In 1893, Riedeselle won $50 in a New York Herald contest for designing the best practical bicycling dress. Her design included billowy trousers gathered below the knee, flat boots, and a bodice with gathers and smocking, to hold the fabric close to the torso while riding. She used dark navy fabric, with "dashes of red Chinese silk" and long tassels fastened at the waist.

In 1897, after some months of physical training and study, and sewing her own wardrobe for the cold, she went to Alaska. She stayed in the mining camps of the Klondike, practicing as a healer for humans and sled dogs. She opened a sanatarium at Dawson City in 1900, offering massages, baths, haircare, rest, and healthful meals to exhausted or injured miners.

After making a reported fortune in Alaska, she moved to Southern California, where she lived alone as a "hermitress" in a cabin in Santa Anita Canyon. "It is the life of a free woman," she assured a visiting reporter, "unchecked and freed from the trammels of a sordid civilization which binds its devotees to the petty conventionalities of life." In spring 1909, she was the only woman participating in the Los Angeles Athletic Club's annual hiking race up Mount Wilson; she completed the hike in 2 hours and 30 minutes. She returned to Alaska from California in summer 1909, and described her plans to move to Minnesota next.

== Personal life ==
Riedeselle was a vegetarian from 1889, and was described as a widow. She died in 1915, from dysentery, while on a pilgrimage at an ashram in Dehradun, India: "In her struggle against cooked food, which she always disliked, she swallowed nothing but water of the holy Ganges," explained an acquaintance who was with her in the end.
