= Little Santa Anita Canyon =

Watershed in California

Coordinates: 34.17021°N 118.04423°W

Little Santa Anita Canyon is a canyon in the southern San Gabriel Mountains and Angeles National Forest, within Los Angeles County, southern California,

The canyon runs south from Mount Wilson down to the town of Sierra Madre. Little Santa Anita Creek, which flows in it, is dammed by the Sierra Madre Dam.

The Mount Wilson Trail, a hiking trail along the western side of the canyon to the summit of Mount Wilson, has its trailhead in Sierra Madre.

== See also ==
- Santa Anita Canyon
