= Annita =

Annita is a feminine given name. Notable people with the name include:

- Annita Demetriou, Cypriot politician
- Annita van Doorn (born 1983), Dutch short track speed skater
- Annita á Fríðriksmørk (born 1968), Faroese politician and teacher
- Annita van Iersel, Dutch-Australian artist
- Annita McPhee, former president of the Tahltan Nation in Canada
- Annita McVeigh, Northern Irish journalist and news presenter
- Annita Pania, Greek television hostess
- Annita Smith (born 1944), Dutch diver
- Annita Theocharaki (fl. 2021), one of the founders of the "Mapping Ancient Athens" project
- Annita Tuller (1910–1994), American mathematician

== See also ==
- Nitazoxanide, antiparasitic and antiviral drug also sold under the brand name "Annita"
- Anita (given name), feminine given name
- Anitta (disambiguation)
