= Gabrielino Trail =

Angeles National Forest, California, U.S.

Coordinates: 34°15′49″N 118°02′35″W

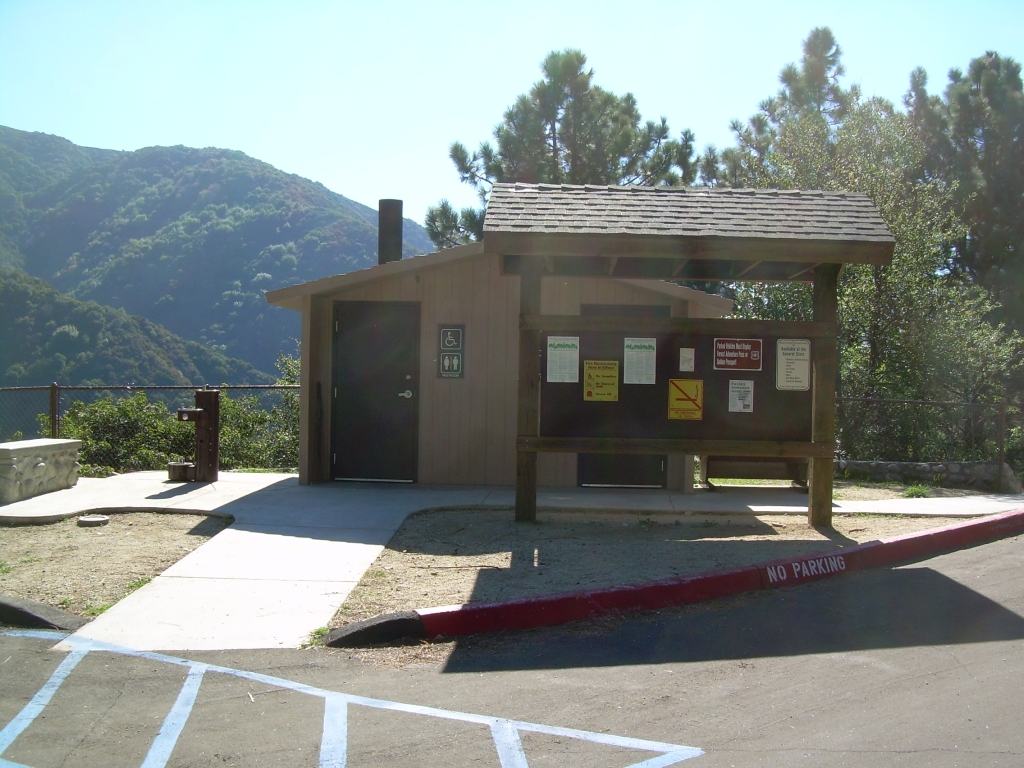
- East end of the Gabrielino Trail, lower Chantry Flat
- Length: 28.5 mi (45.9 km)
- Location: Western San Gabriel Mountains, Los Angeles County, California, USA
- Designation: National Recreation Trail
- Trailheads: Altadena, Chantry Flat
- Use: Hiking

The Gabrielino Trail is a United States National Recreation Trail that runs through the Angeles National Forest in Los Angeles County, California. Its western trailhead is at Windsor Avenue in Altadena, California, and it runs generally east/west, with its eastern end at Chantry Flat, just north of Arcadia, California. It passes through three major watersheds and has an elevation gain/loss of 3,500 ft (1,100 m).

== History ==
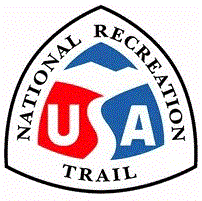
National Recreation Trail Logo

When several existing trails were renamed to make a "new" 28.5 mile (45 km) trail in 1970, in compliance with the National Trails System Act, the Forest Service announcement read as follows:

This trail has been created for you - the city dweller - so that you might exchange, for a short time, the hectic scene of your urban life for the rugged beauty and freedom of adventure into the solitary wonderland of nature.

== Directions ==
Travelling westbound, the trail winds its way from Chantry Flat, through Big Santa Anita Canyon past Sturtevant Falls and Sturtevant's Camp, then over Newcomb's Pass into the West Fork of the San Gabriel River. The trail meets the river at Devore Campground then follows the watercourse upstream to West Fork Campground.

To this point, the Gabrielino Trail has been tracing the Silver Moccasin Trail. It is across the stream from West Fork Campground that the Silver Moccasin Trail heads up Shortcut Canyon for the San Gabriel High Country. To continue on the Gabrielino Trail, travel west to the head of the West Fork at Red Box Saddle near Mount Wilson. This is the trail's highest point.

From Red Box, the Gabrielino continues westward down the Arroyo Seco through Commodore Switzer Trail Camp, Oakwilde and Gould Mesa Campgrounds, and emerges from The Arroyo at the Jet Propulsion Laboratory. The entire route of the trail was declared open in a press release by the Forest Service August 27, 2018 Due to the 2009 Station Fire, part of the Gabrielino was closed by the USFS including the portion of the trail between Switzer down to the Arroyo Seco. With the help of a joint project from a variety of trail groups including the Mt. Wilson Bicycling Association (MWBA) and CORBA, the reopening of the trail was announced August 27, 2018.

== Facilities ==
Potable water is available at the Chantry Flat trailhead and at Red Box Saddle, but otherwise one must boil or filter the stream water. Very little cell phone service along the entire route.

The following is a list of Forest Service facilities along the route of the Gabrielino Trail, east to west:

- Chantry Flat Picnic Area
- Cascade Picnic Area
- Spruce Grove Campground
- Newcomb's Pass Picnic Area
- Devore Trail Camp
- West Fork Campground
- Valley Forge Campground
- Switzer's Picnic Area
- Commodore Switzer Trail Camp
- Oakwilde Campground
- Paul Little Picnic Area
- Niño Picnic Area
- Gould Mesa Campground
- Teddy's Outpost Picnic Area

== See also ==
- Henninger Flats
- Tongva/Gabrieliño people
