= Puddingstone Reservoir =

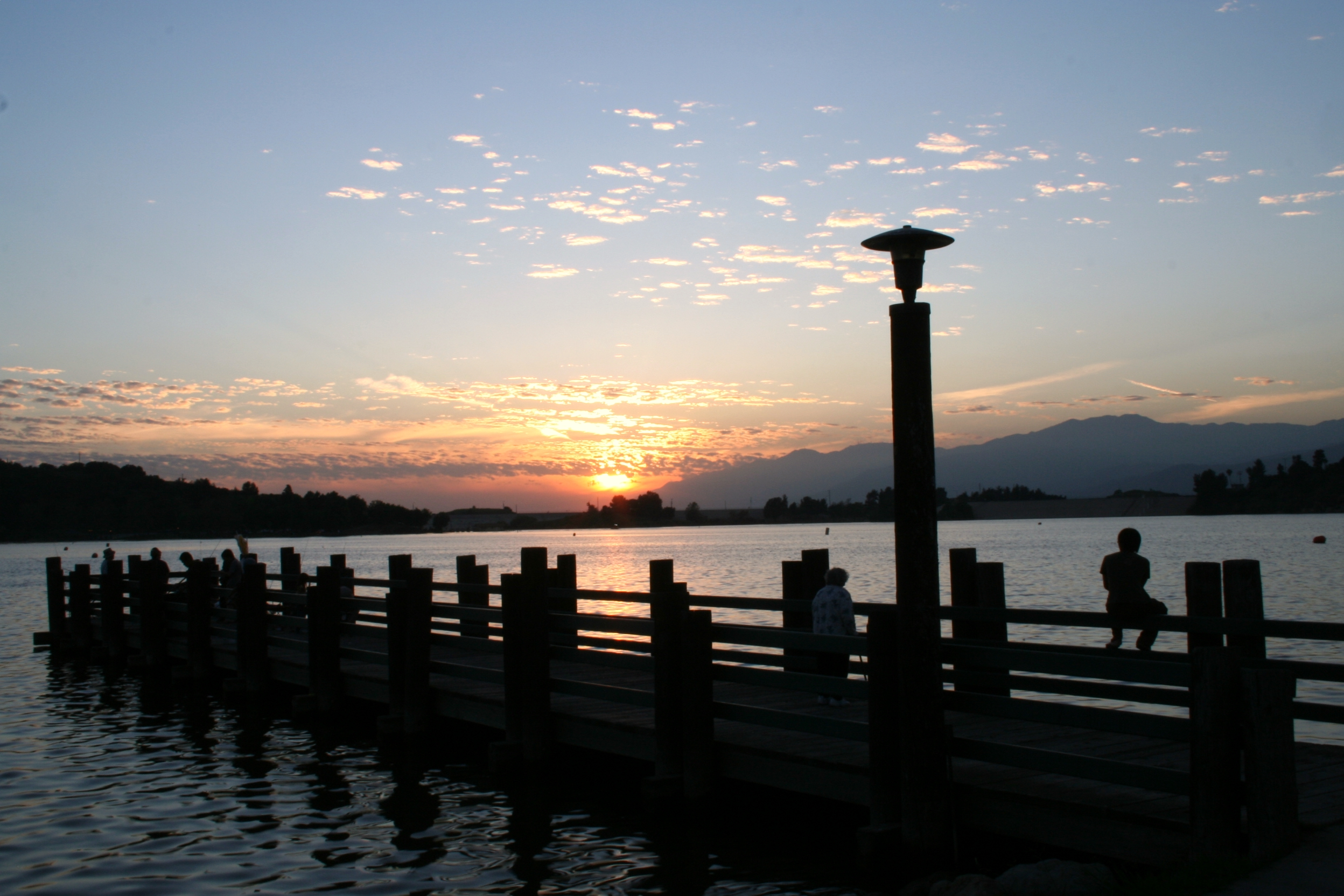
- Sunset

- Location within California Location within the United States
- Location: Los Angeles County, California
- Coordinates: 34°05′25″N 117°48′31″W
- Type: reservoir
- Basin countries: United States
- Surface area: 250 acres (1.0 km^{2})
- Surface elevation: 942 ft (287 m)

Puddingstone Reservoir is a 250-acre (1 km²) artificial lake northeast of the interchange between the Orange Freeway (State Route 57) and the San Bernardino Freeway (Interstate 10) in Los Angeles County, California, United States. Activities include fishing, swimming, sailing, windsurfing, and camping. It is fed by Live Oak Wash and drains into Walnut Creek.

Brackett Field, Raging Waters, and Fairplex (formerly the Los Angeles County Fairgrounds) are all adjacent to Puddingstone Reservoir, which is inside Bonelli Regional Park.

In 1923, the County of Los Angeles Flood Control District purchased a large piece of land to construct a dam to hold back floodwaters from an area covering 30.3 square miles (78 km^{2}). Work on the Puddingstone Dam started in February, 1925 and was completed in January, 1928. In 1932, a road across the top of the dam was constructed, creating a more direct route between the Pacific Electric station in San Dimas and Pomona Blvd. in Pomona. It was a considerably more direct route south - travelers previously had to either go west through Covina or east through Ganesha Park in Pomona.

Historically, Puddingstone Reservoir, besides acting as a flood control basin, also provided water to the local citrus growers. Water was pumped to a smaller reservoir further north, which was used for irrigation purposes. It was soon used for recreation as well, with fishing, boating, and swimming allowed along selected beach areas. Los Angeles County established Frank G. Bonelli Regional Park at the site. A swimming pool facility was constructed by the county in the area just north of the reservoir, but in the late 1970s or early 1980s, they leased the area to a private developer who constructed Raging Waters, a pioneering water-themed amusement park.

Today, the road over the dam is still in use and is undergoing major upgrades. Following the construction of Raging Waters, the road was renamed Raging Waters Drive, and extends from the entrance to the park on the south, to Puddingstone Drive on the north. The original portion of the road's right of way to Pomona was developed as part of the Orange Freeway (State Route 57).

The California Office of Environmental Health Hazard Assessment has issued a safe eating advisory for any fish caught in the Puddingstone Reservoir due to elevated levels of mercury and PCBs.

== History ==
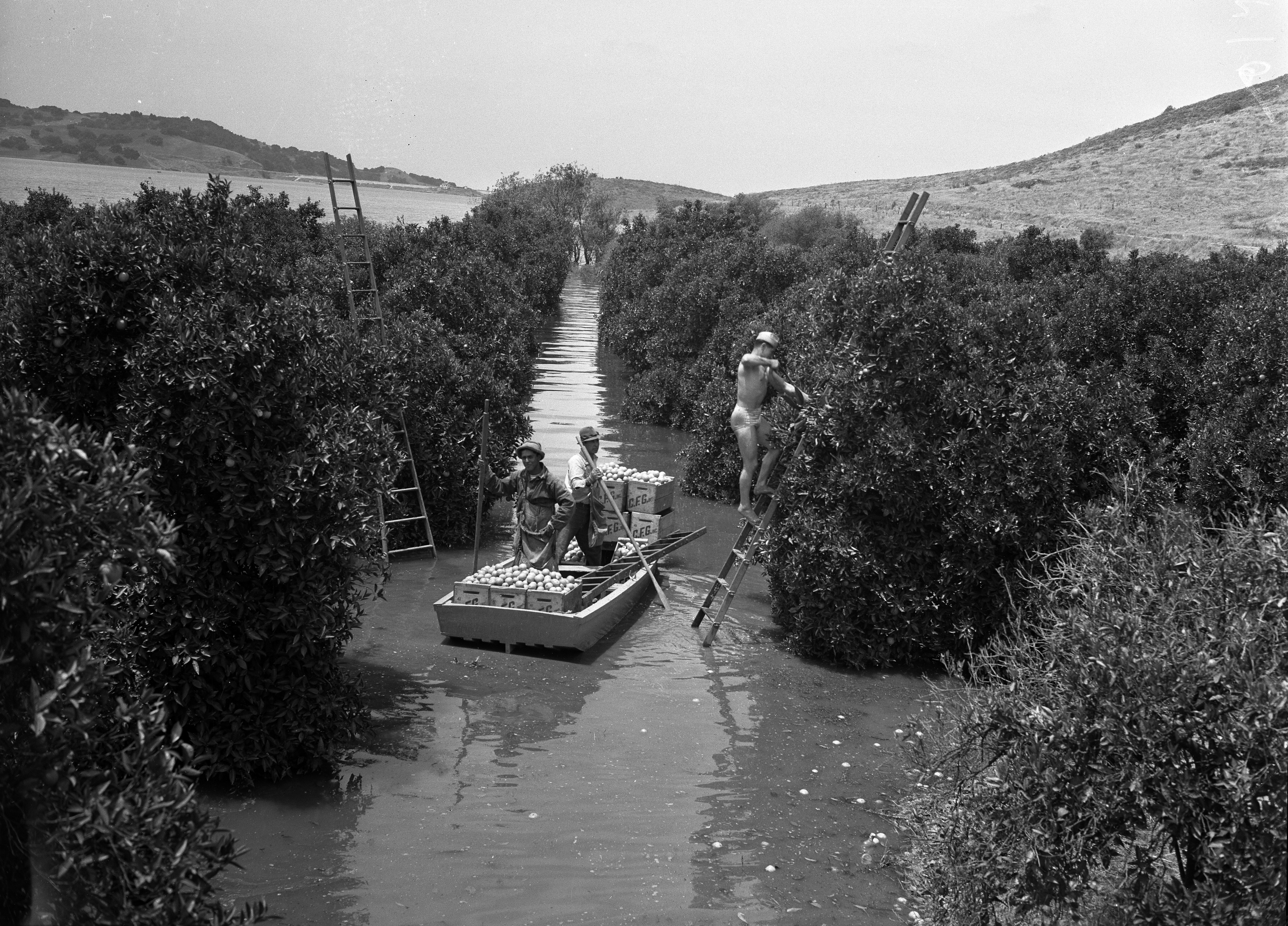
Valencia orange grove pickers gathering the fruit in rowboats and bathing suits after Puddingstone Reservoir flood. High water in the Puddingstone Dam Reservoir partially submerged a 10-acre Valencia orange grove so that pickers gather the fruit in rowboats and bathing suits. Trino Guillen, Joe Partida and Gavino Lopez are shown at work in the world's only floating citrus patch. June 3, 1941

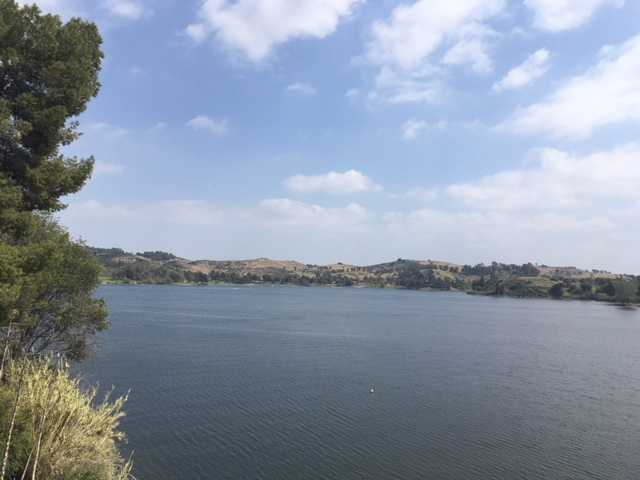
Puddingstone Reservoir in the afternoon

- The earliest evidence of water in the semiarid rolling hills of what is now the eastern portion of the San Gabriel Valley at Mud Springs, North of today's Puddingstone Dam. Indians, explorers and adventurers probably took water from mud springs during times when sheep and cattle grazed across the land. Later, soldiers and stagecoach drivers were among those who stopped at the historical site. The adobe at the north edge puddingstone reservoir was built in 1882 before citrus orchards appeared in the San Jose hills area.
- Concern for the water grew with the increasing number of settlements in East San Gabriel Valley and the need for water storage receptacles became apparent.
- In 1923, the Los Angeles County Flood Control District purchased a large piece of land to construct a dam to hold back floodwaters from an area covering 30.3 square miles (78 km^{2}). Work on the Puddingstone Dam started in February, 1925 and was completed in January, 1928.
- When completed in 1928 at a cost of one million dollars, the dam was originally built as a flood control facility to impound storm run-off and replenish underground water supplies.
- The dam created a 250-acre lake. In 1931 the Department of Recreation Camps, and Playgrounds (which later became Department of Parks and Recreation) assigned lifeguards to protect those involved in the newly allowed fishing and swimming activities.
- In 1932, a road across the top of the dam was constructed, creating a more direct route between the Pacific Electric station in San Dimas and Pomona Blvd. in Pomona. It was a considerably more direct route south - travelers previously had to either go west through Covina or east through Ganesha Park in Pomona.
- In 1948 a parking lot was installed through the County Department of Parks and Recreation.
- In 1950 the County Board of Supervisors instructed the County Administrative Officer and the County Department of Recreation to report on possible development of the Puddingstone Area for recreational purposes.
- In 1953 the 150-acre Puddingstone Reservoir was designated as a "Recreational and Fishing Area". It was stocked with fish by the state fish and game commission.
- By 1958, arrangements had been made to allow the county to purchase extra water for the lake. Built as a flood control facility, the lake was subject to fluctuations and now the county was able to maintain a constant-level lake. This was a big step to opening the reservoir for full recreation. The land for Frank G. Bonelli Park was assembled by various lease agreements, land grant deeds, condemnation actions and private interests to eventually compromise nearly 2,000 acres.
- In 1959 a drive spearheaded by supervisor Frank G. Bonelli, the county department of parks and recreation assumed responsibility for the Puddingstone area. This year the first patrol boat appeared on the lake and the boat house was constructed.
- Mass planting of more than 10,000 trees in the northeast section was begun by volunteers of 50 civic groups from 14 cities and communities in East San Gabriel Valley area.
- Water skiing was initiated along the east shoreline of the 200 acre water surface.
- In 1963 the county leased for operation and maintenance the 18-hole Mountain Meadows golf course from Pomona Golf and country club. The course opened in 1921 as a private course, was formerly called Mountain Meadows Golf Club.
- In 1970 a forty-year joint powers agreement was entered into by the county of Los Angeles and the cities of Covina, Glendora, La Verne, Pomona, San Dimas, and Walnut. The agreement established the Los Angeles County Puddingstone Reservoir Regional Park Authority (now Frank G. Bonelli Regional Park Authority).
- Under this agreement, Los Angeles County was now responsible for facility financing and improvements. The Authority had the power to sell revenue bonds to finance the construction of the park. In support of the project, the state legislature authorized the transfer of the state property to the county in fee title.
- By 1972 development had been completed on the north shore and included a swim park (now Raging Waters) a powerboat launching facility, and group picnic area.
- By 1976 the south shore consisted of sailboat launching facilities, picnic valley and east shore fishing areas. Mountain Meadows Golf Course was renovated and equestrian facilities were added. The recreational vehicle park was also opened in 1976.
- In 1986 the Puddingstone Hot Tubs were opened.

== Activities ==
Activities include fishing, swimming, sailing, jet skiing, and wind surfing. There is a launching area for boats on the north shore.

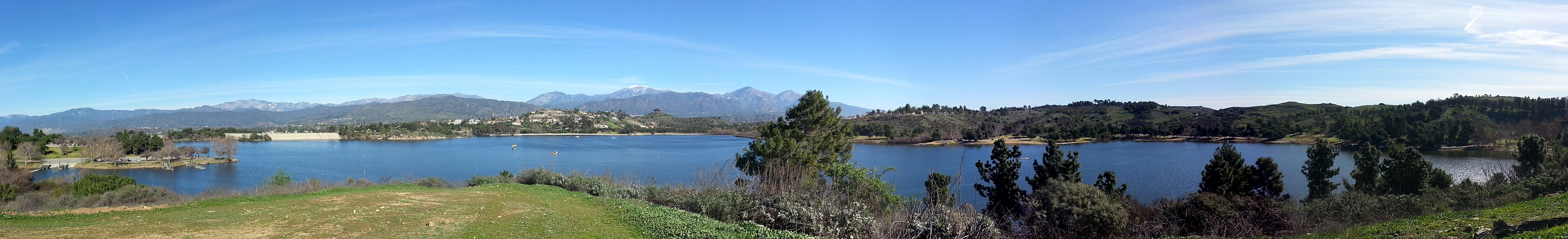
Puddingstone Reservoir panorama

== See also ==
- List of lakes in California
- List of dams and reservoirs in California
