= San Dimas Experimental Forest =

American biosphere reserve and forest

San Dimas Biosphere Reserve and Experimental Forest
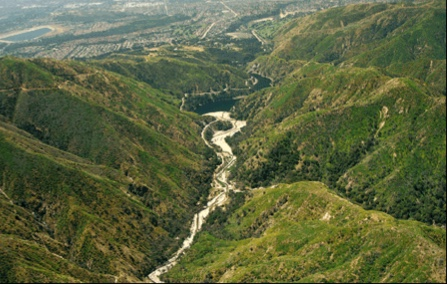
- View down San Dimas Canyon

- Location within California Location within the United States
- Location: Angeles National Forest, Los Angeles County, USA
- Nearest city: Glendora, California
- Coordinates: 34°12′N 117°46′W
- Area: 6,495 hectares (25.08 sq mi)
- Governing body: United States Forest Service

The San Dimas Biosphere Reserve and Experimental Forest is an experimental forest located in the front range of the San Gabriel Mountains of southern California. San Dimas constitutes a protected field laboratory jointly managed by the Angeles National Forest and the Pacific Southwest Research Station of the United States Forest Service under the designation San Dimas Experimental Forest. It was designated as a UNESCO Biosphere Reserve in 1976 and withdrawn from the programme in July 2018.

It encompasses the upper Big Dalton and San Dimas watersheds. The 6,495 hectares (25.08 sq mi) experimental forest was originally established in 1933 and was designated as a biosphere reserve in 1976.

San Dimas is a chaparral-dominated Mediterranean ecosystem. In addition to the chaparral vegetation (including chamise), riparian woodland, sage-buckwheat and barren areas, oak woodland and open yellow pine woodlands are represented. The Fern Canyon Research Natural Area is in the remote eastern part the San Dimas reserve. This 555 hectares (2.14 sq mi) Research Natural Area includes Brown's Flat, a locally unique mountain meadow that supports a relict grove of ponderosa pine (Pinus ponderosa Douglas ex C. Lawson).

In addition to Fern Canyon, the reserve's research facilities include over 50 gauged watersheds, a lysimeter complex, two major dams and reservoirs—San Dimas Dam and Big Dalton Dam—and three plantations of domestic and introduced trees.

Studies at San Dimas have provided valuable information on air pollution, fire effects, erosion, hydrology, and plants and animals in southern California watersheds. The area also provides opportunities for ecological research to many nearby colleges, universities and governmental agencies.

Wildfires have frequently burned through the San Dimas area, most recently when the Williams Fire burned much of the forest in September 2002.

The forest is currently closed for the general public, except under special written permit. No hunting or other recreational activities are currently allowed.

== Sources ==
This article incorporates text from a free content work (license statement/permission). Text taken from UNESCO - MAB Biosphere Reserves Directory, UNESCO, UNESCO.
