= Santa Anita Creek =

Santa Anita Creek Big Santa Anita Creek, Santa Anita Wash
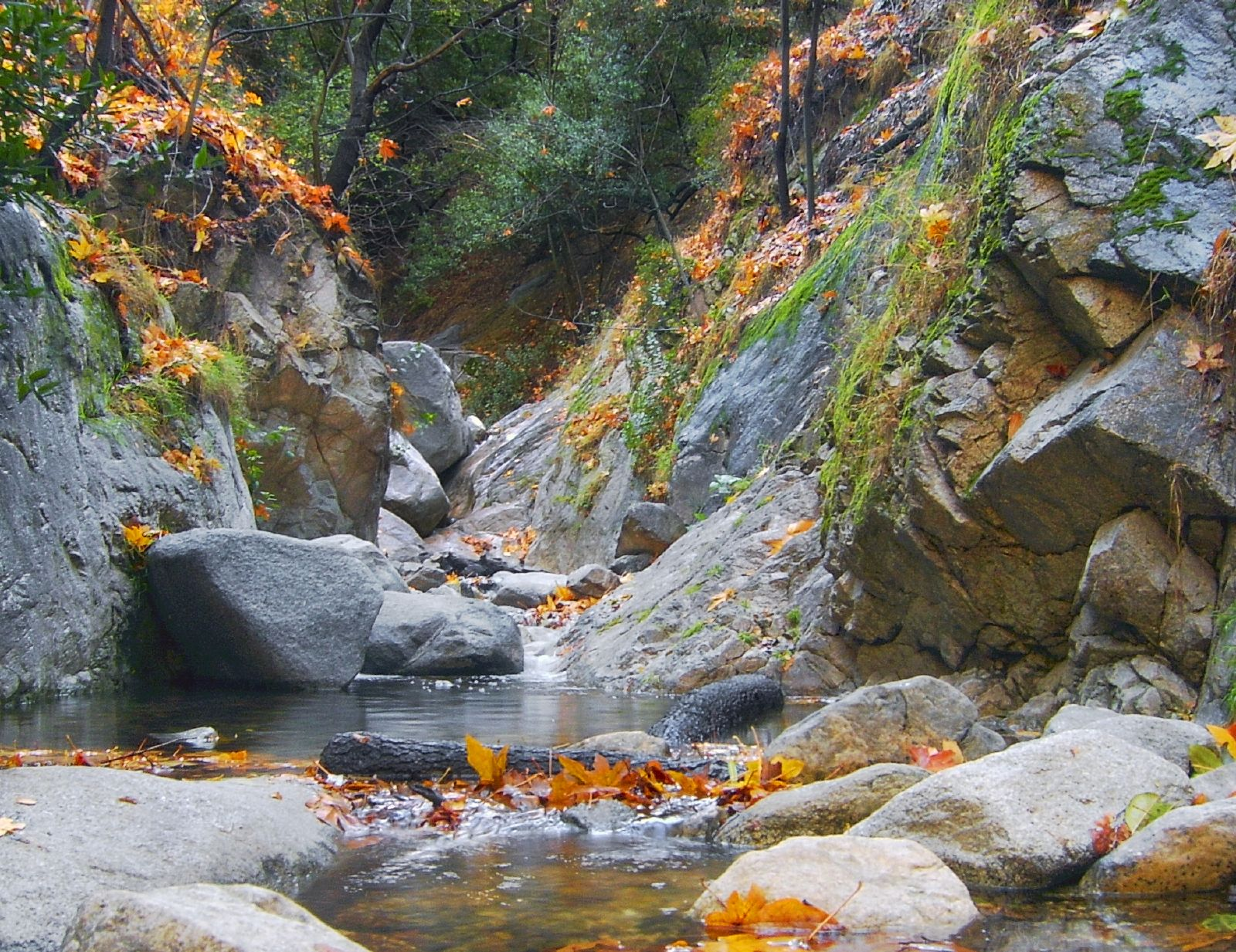
- The creek near the First Water trail junction

Location
- Country: United States
- State: California
- Region: Los Angeles County
- Cities: Sierra Madre, Arcadia, Monrovia, Azusa, Irwindale

Physical characteristics
- Source: Eastern flank of Mount Wilson
  - location: Angeles National Forest, San Gabriel Mountains
  - elevation: 4,600 ft (1,400 m)
- Mouth: Rio Hondo
  - location: Irwindale, San Gabriel Valley
  - coordinates: 34°06′12″N 118°00′56″W
  - elevation: 320 ft (98 m)
- Length: 10.4 mi (16.7 km), North-south
- Basin size: 15 mi^{2} (39 km^{2})
- Discharge
  - average: 9 cu ft/s (0.25 m^{3}/s)
  - minimum: 0 cu ft/s (0 m^{3}/s)
  - maximum: 7,000 cu ft/s (200 m^{3}/s)

Basin features
- River system: Rio Hondo
- Tributaries
  - left: North Fork Santa Anita Creek, East Fork Santa Anita Creek
  - right: Winter Creek

Santa Anita Creek (Santa Anita Wash on federal maps) is a 10.4-mile (16.7 km) long stream in Los Angeles County, California. It flows southwards from its headwaters in the south ridge of the San Gabriel Mountains, to form the beginnings of the Rio Hondo near Irwindale.

== Course ==
The creek begins on the east slope of Mount Wilson, inside the Angeles National Forest. It flows in a curve southeast through Santa Anita Canyon, then drops over the 60-foot (18 m) Sturtevant Falls. The North Fork comes in from the left about a quarter-mile above the falls, and the East Fork also from the left about a quarter-mile downstream. The creek then flows south through a group of about 80 historic cabins on the canyon floor, before receiving Winter Creek from the right near Chantry Flat. Shortly downstream of there, it drops over Hermit Falls and flows into Santa Anita Reservoir, which is impounded by the 225-foot (69 m) Santa Anita Dam.

Leaving the foothills the creek continues southwards through Sierra Madre, Monrovia and Arcadia as the Santa Anita Wash, flowing in a concrete channel. It turns southeast towards Azusa, then south again at Irwindale, where it empties into a small flood control basin.

The water continues out of the basin as the Rio Hondo, which flows southwards to junctions with the San Gabriel River and the Los Angeles River.
