= Whittier Narrows Dam =

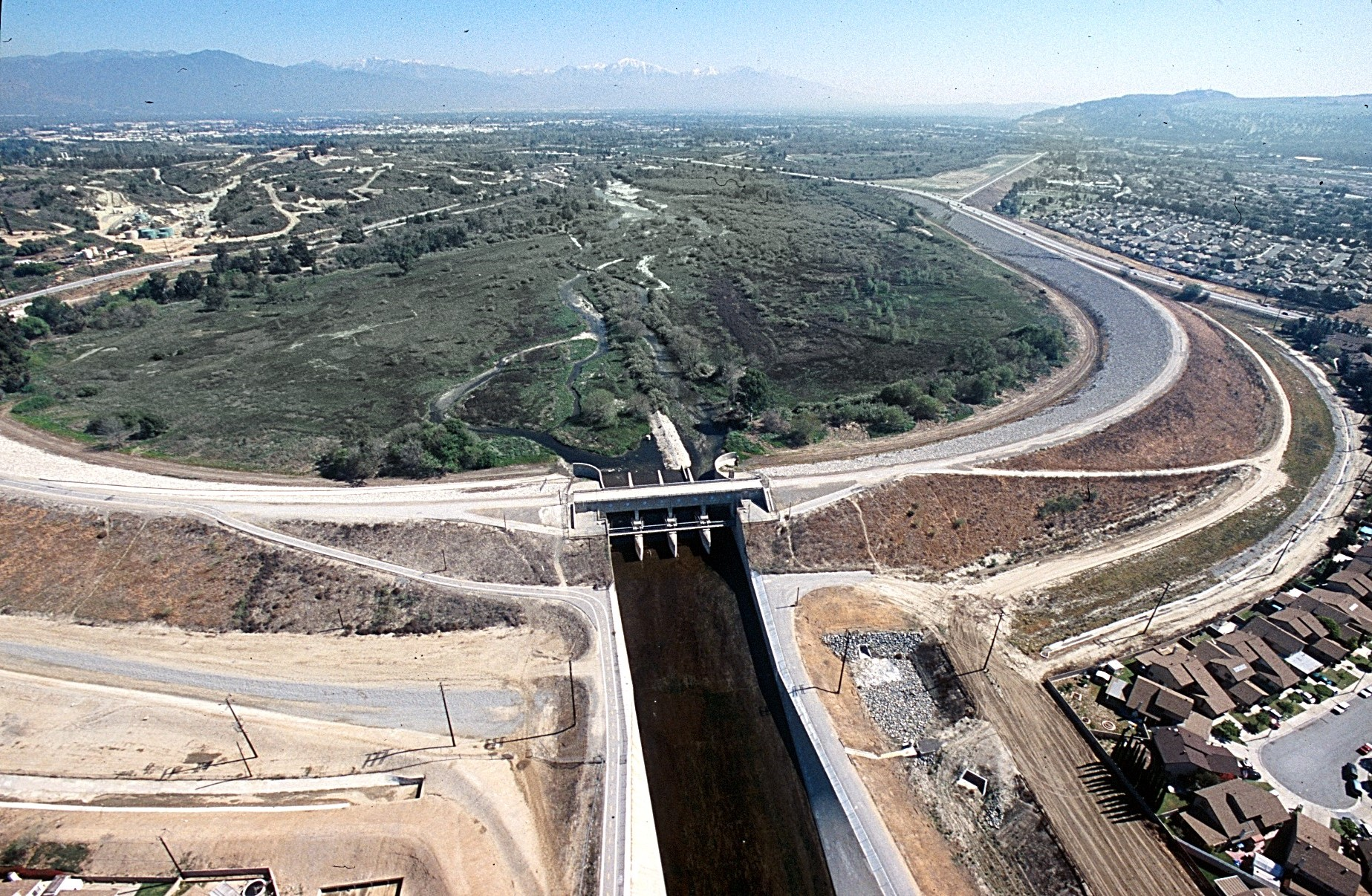
- Aerial view of Whittier Narrows Dam looking upstream through the Rio Hondo Spillway.
- Interactive map of Whittier Narrows Dam
- Location: Los Angeles County, California, U.S.
- Coordinates: 34°01′12″N 118°04′58″W
- Opening date: 1956 (70 years ago)

Dam and spillways
- Impounds: Rio Hondo; San Gabriel River
- Height (foundation): 56 feet (17 m)
- Length: 16,960 feet (5,170 m)
- Elevation at crest: 236 feet (72 m)
- Width (crest): 32 feet (9.8 m)
- Dam volume: 12,166 cu yd (9,302 m^{3})
- Spillway type: Automated spillway overflow
- Parapet width: 16 ft (4.9 m)
- Hydraulic head: 182 ft (55 m)

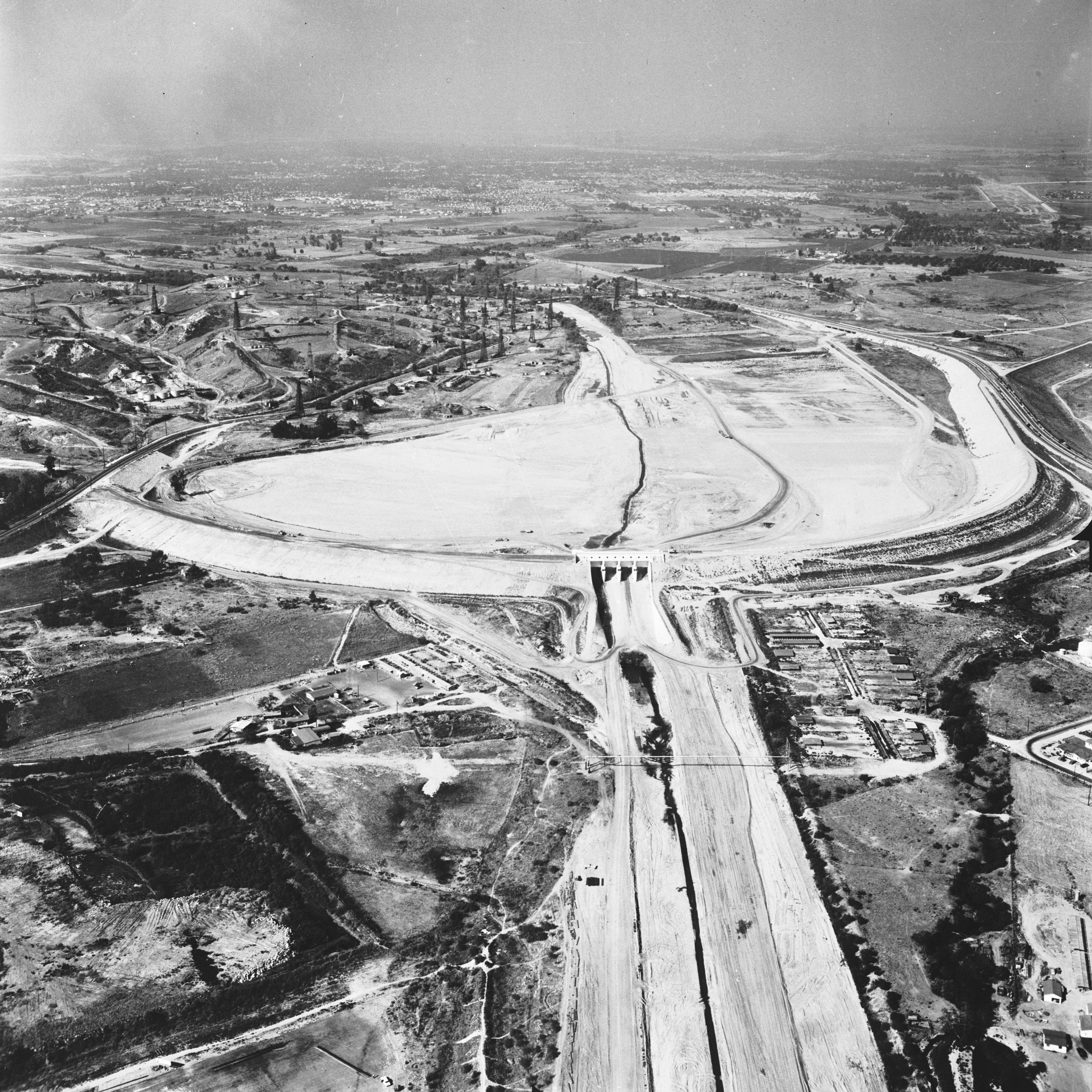
Dam in 1957, just prior to completion

Whittier Narrows Dam is a 56-foot (17 m) tall earth dam on the San Gabriel River and the smaller, parallel Rio Hondo. The dam is located, as the name implies, at the Whittier Narrows. It provides water conservation storage and is also the central element of the Los Angeles County Drainage Area (LACDA) flood control system. Its reservoir has a capacity of 67,060 acre⋅ft (82,720,000 m^{3}).

The Whittier Narrows are a natural gap in the hills that form the southern boundary of the San Gabriel Valley of Southern California. Both the Rio Hondo, a tributary of the Los Angeles River, and the San Gabriel River flow through this gap and are impounded by the reservoir. The Pomona Freeway (CA-60) passes through the reservoir flood control basin and the San Gabriel River Freeway (I-605) passes along the eastern boundary of the basin.

In September 2017, the United States Army Corps of Engineers officials warned local residents that the dam no longer met the agency's 'tolerable-risk' guidelines and could fail in the event of a very large, very rare storm, similar to exceptionally intense California storms which occurred between December 1861 and January 1862, a so-called ARkStorm

Authorization for the project construction is contained in the Flood Control Act of 18 August 1941 (PL 77-228) and the initial funds for construction were provided in the 1949 Appropriations Bill. The U.S. Army Corps of Engineers completed construction of the dam in 1957.

== Flood control ==
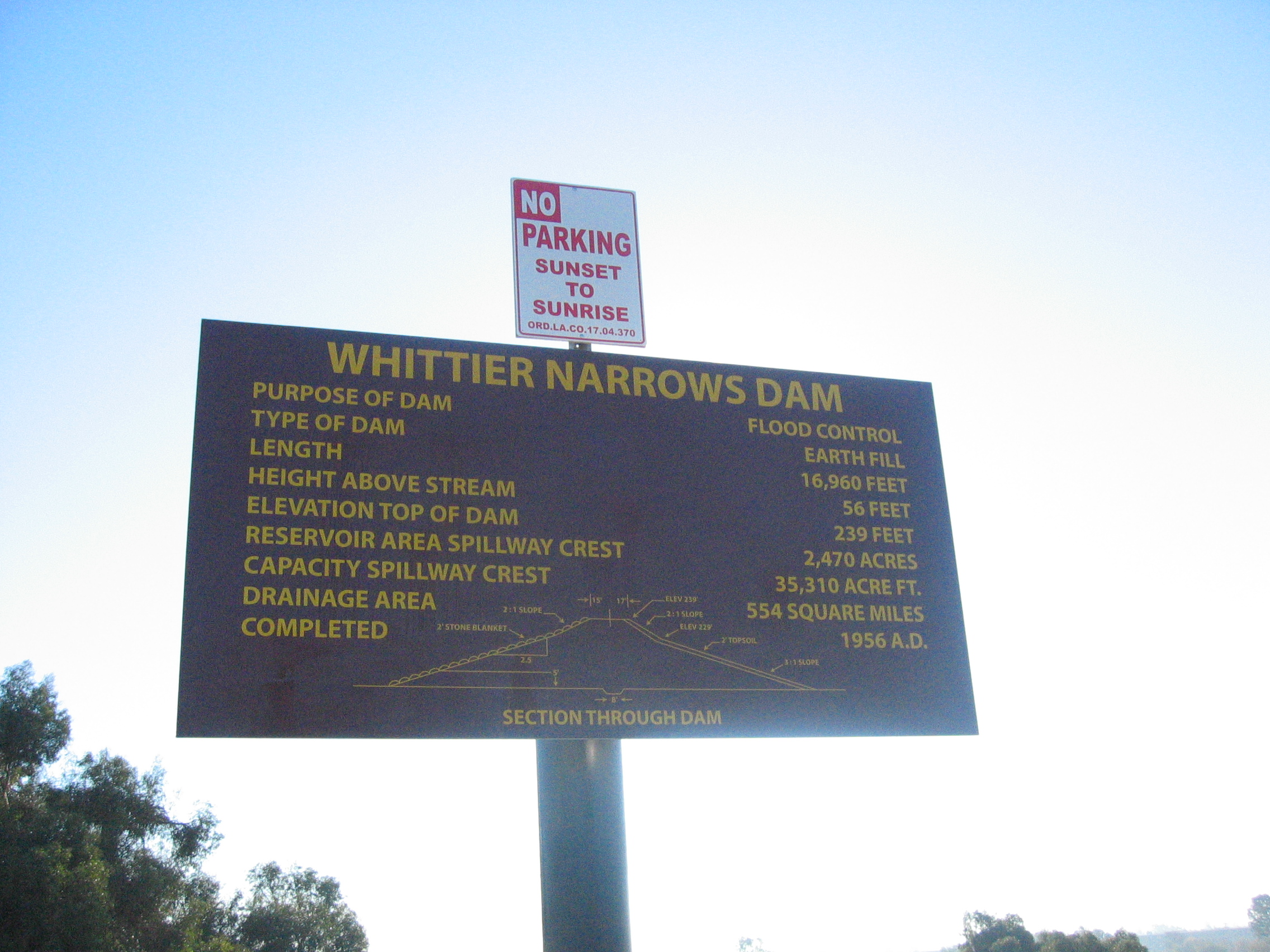
Whittier Narrows Dam Sign

The purpose of the project is to collect runoff from the uncontrolled drainage areas upstream along with releases into the San Gabriel River from the Santa Fe Dam. Like Santa Fe Dam, Whittier Narrows Dam is primarily a dry dam.

The Rio Hondo outlet has four main outlet passages plus a small diversion passage. The San Gabriel outlet has nine large gates installed on top of a spillway. Dimensions are furnished in the table below.

The "stand-by" position of the gates on the Rio Hondo outlet is wide open. On the San Gabriel side one gate is normally open about .5 ft (15 cm) with the remaining gates closed. The reservoir is normally empty, and a "crossover weir" within the reservoir keeps the flows from the Rio Hondo and the San Gabriel River separated. The natural flow to each river therefore normally passes through the dam unhindered.

During the initial stages of a flood event, the gates on the Rio Hondo side are partially closed to build a water conservation pool. As long as the pool on the Rio Hondo side of the reservoir is below elevation 201.6 ft (61.4 m) NGVD29, releases are made to accommodate the capacity of the spreading grounds downstream along the Rio Hondo. The spreading grounds are operated by the Los Angeles County Department of Public Works to recharge the groundwater basin. Flow reaches the spreading grounds either directly by way of the diversion passage or from a diversion structure in the Rio Hondo downstream of the dam. Both the diversion passage direct from the dam and the diversion structure in the Rio Hondo are operated by the county.

When the water conservation pool on the Rio Hondo side of the reservoir is exceeded, the releases to the Rio Hondo are increased to match inflow until either the capacity of the Rio Hondo or the Los Angeles River downstream are reached. If the water conservation pool on either side of the reservoir is exceeded, discharges on the San Gabriel side can be increased to approximately 5000 ft^{3}/s (142 m^{3}/s).

The San Gabriel outlet has automatic spillway gates. When the pool in the reservoir exceeds flood control storage these gates will begin to open automatically. The top of the flood control storage pool is at elevation 228.5 ft (69.6 m) NGVD.

The capacity of the Rio Hondo downstream from Whittier Narrows Dam is approximately 36,500 ft^{3}/s (1,034 m^{3}/s). The capacity of the Los Angeles River downstream of its confluence with the Rio Hondo is approximately 127,000 ft^{3}/s (3,596 m^{3}/s), and the capacity of the San Gabriel River downstream of the dam is approximately 13,000 ft^{3}/s (371 m^{3}/s).

== See also ==
- List of dams and reservoirs in California
- Whittier Narrows
