= Puddingstone Dam =

- Location within California
- Country: United States
- Location: San Dimas, Los Angeles County, California
- Coordinates: 34°05′25″N 117°48′33″W
- Construction began: 1925; 101 years ago
- Opening date: 1928; 98 years ago
- Owner: Los Angeles County Department of Public Works

Dam and spillways
- Type of dam: Rock-fill
- Impounds: Walnut Creek
- Height: 147 ft (45 m)
- Length: 2,698 ft (822 m)
- Spillways: Overflow

Reservoir
- Creates: Puddingstone Reservoir
- Total capacity: 22,232 acre⋅ft (27,423,000 m^{3})
- Active capacity: 16,342 acre⋅ft (20,158,000 m^{3})
- Catchment area: 33.1 mi^{2} (86 km^{2})
- Surface area: 490 acres (200 ha)

Power Station
- Hydraulic head: 135 ft (41 m)

Puddingstone Dam is a 147 ft (45 m) high earth and rockfill dam in the San Gabriel Valley, within San Dimas in eastern Los Angeles County, California.

The dam was built in 1928 by the Los Angeles County Department of Public Works, which continues to operate it.

== Geography ==
Puddingstone Dam serves mainly for flood control. It impounds Walnut Creek, a tributary of the San Gabriel River, to form Puddingstone Reservoir, which can hold more than 20,000 acre⋅ft (25,000,000 m^{3}) of water. The reservoir stores floodwater from both the Walnut Creek Wash, and also the San Dimas Wash, to which it is connected by a short artificial channel below San Dimas Dam.

== See also ==
- List of dams and reservoirs in California
- San Gabriel River topics
- San Gabriel Valley topics
