= Big Dalton Dam =

Flood control dam in Los Angeles County, California, USA

Coordinates: 34°10′06″N 117°48′36″W

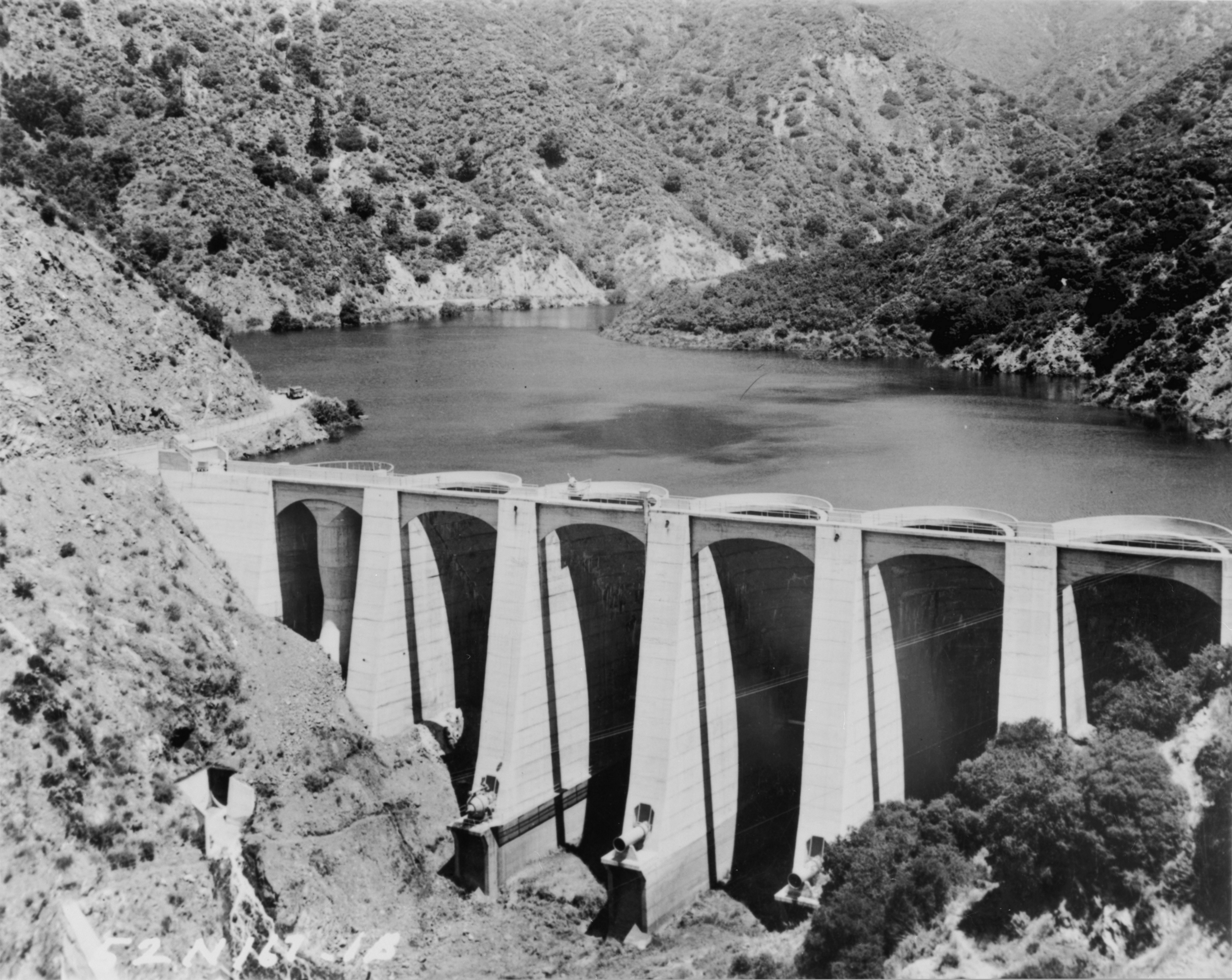
Big Dalton Dam near full capacity, February 15, 1973.

Big Dalton Dam is a multiple arch concrete dam in Los Angeles County, California, built for the Los Angeles County Flood Control District and completed in August 1929. The dam is one of the earliest of the multiple arch "double-wall" buttress designs of engineer Fred A. Noetzli. The 991 acre-foot (1.2 million cubic meter) dam provides water conservation and controls flooding from Big Dalton Canyon, a watershed within the San Dimas Experimental Forest, part of the Angeles National Forest in the San Gabriel Mountains. It is about 4 miles northeast of the city of Glendora and is operated by the Los Angeles County Department of Public Works.

== See also ==
- List of dams and reservoirs in California
