= San Dimas Dam =

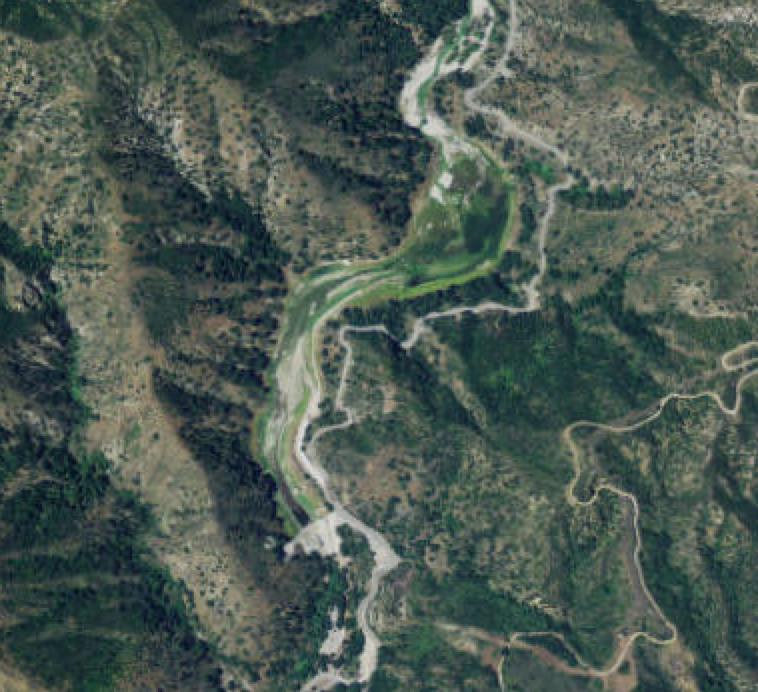
- Aerial view

- Location of San Dimas Dam in California
- Country: United States
- Location: Los Angeles County, California
- Coordinates: 34°09′18″N 117°46′19″W
- Purpose: Flood control
- Opening date: 1922
- Owner: Los Angeles County Department of Public Works

Dam and spillways
- Type of dam: Concrete Gravity
- Impounds: San Dimas Wash
- Height (foundation): 339.8 ft (103.6 m)
- Length: 130.9 ft (39.9 m)
- Dam volume: 1,529 yd^{3} (1,169 m^{3})

Reservoir
- Creates: San Dimas Reservoir
- Total capacity: 1,515 acre⋅ft (1,869,000 m^{3})

San Dimas Dam is a concrete gravity dam in Los Angeles County, California. The dam and its flood control basin/reservoir are in the San Gabriel Mountains and within the Angeles National Forest. The dam is currently operated by the Los Angeles County Department of Public Works but was originally built by the Los Angeles County Flood Control District in 1922. The dam controls flooding from San Dimas Creek, a major San Gabriel Mountains drainage and tributary of the San Gabriel River. As a flood control facility the San Dimas Reservoir is dry for most of the year, only storing water after significant winter storms. The regulation provided by the dam allows for the efficient diversion of floodwaters from San Dimas Wash to Puddingstone Reservoir, which protects the San Dimas area of the San Gabriel Valley.

== History ==
After the flood of 1914 and the creation of the Los Angeles Flood Control District in 1915, the District launched a flood control and water conservation program. The program initiated the construction of 14 dams throughout Los Angeles County, one of which was the San Dimas Dam. Although the dam was originally built by the Los Angeles Flood Control District in 1922, the dam is currently operated by the Los Angeles County Department of Public Works. In 1984, the planning and operational activities of the dam were transferred from the Flood Control District to the Department of Public Works in an operational agreement. According to the Los Angeles County Department of Public Works website, "Public Works Flood Maintenance and Water Resources Divisions, respectively, oversee its maintenance and operational efforts."

== Geography ==
The San Dimas Dam is located in Los Angeles County, California within the Angeles National Forest. The dam is 130.9 feet (39.9 m) high and 339.8 feet (103.6 m) long, with a storage capacity of 1,515 acre feet (1,869,000 m^{3}) of water. The dam is surrounded by the San Gabriel Mountains and has an incoming flow from the San Dimas Creek. The dam controls flooding from San Dimas Creek, a major San Gabriel Mountains drainage and tributary of the San Gabriel River. The dam diverts floodwater to Puddingstone Reservoir, protecting the area in and around San Dimas.

== Infrastructure and Water Management ==
The dam is a concrete gravity dam and is 130.9 feet (39.9 m) high and 339.8 feet (103.6 m) long, with a storage capacity of 1,515 acre feet (1,869,000 m^{3}) of water. The dam controls flooding from San Dimas Creek, a major San Gabriel Mountains drainage and tributary of the San Gabriel River. As a flood control facility, the San Dimas Reservoir is dry for most of the year, only storing water after significant winter storms. The regulation provided by the dam allows for the efficient diversion of floodwaters from San Dimas Wash to Puddingstone Reservoir, which protects the San Dimas area of the San Gabriel Valley. The dam's main purposes are for irrigation, flood control, and water supply.

== See also ==
- List of dams and reservoirs in California
- San Gabriel Mountains topics
