= Mapping Ancient Athens =

Mapping Ancient Athens is a project by a Greek non-profit Dipylon, launched in 2021, that aims to map and provide an interactive digital portal to explore the archaeological remains and historical data from more than 1500 rescue excavations conducted across Athens over the past 160 years. The project created a searchable map interface that layers information from different historical periods, allowing users to browse details about ancient houses, religious sites, water systems, roads, and other findings from excavation reports that were previously difficult to access. It shows data from the Neolithic to the modern era. Dipylon was launched by Annita Theocharaki, Leda Costaki, Maria Pigaki and Wanda Papaefthymiou.
