= Anita, Pennsylvania =

Unincorporated community in Pennsylvania, US

Coordinates: 41°00′05″N 78°57′47″W

Anita is an unincorporated community in Jefferson County, Pennsylvania, United States.

== History ==
A post office has been in operation at Anita since 1891. Anita was originally a mining community.
