= Chantry Flat =

Angeles National Forest, California, U.S.

Coordinates: 34.1955°N 118.0224°W

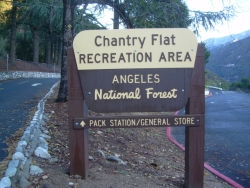
Entrance to the Picnic Area

Chantry Flat is a designated "Recreation Area" within the Angeles National Forest, about three miles (5 km) into Big Santa Anita Canyon, and is closely associated with the towns of Arcadia and Sierra Madre, CA. The flat itself houses a large public picnic area, and is the starting point for several historic trails of the San Gabriel Mountains, including the 28.5-mile (45.9 km) Gabrielino Trail. The US Forest Service estimates the road to Chantry as the third busiest entry into the Angeles, next to CA State Highways 2 and 39.

== Significance ==
Chantry Flat is home to the last pack station in Southern California. It is also the trailhead to Sturtevant's Camp, the oldest resort in the San Gabriels and one of a handful that still exist. The Chantry Flat/Big Santa Anita Canyon area boasts the last magneto-type crank phone system in the United States. The entire watershed is a living museum to the great hiking era in the first half of the twentieth century.

== History ==
In 1905 Iowa-born Charley Chantry arrived in Sierra Madre, CA. He prospected his way there from the Black Hills of the Dakotas by way of the San Gabriel back country. He erected a sturdy tent cabin in Little Santa Anita Canyon from which he rented riding donkeys to kids staying at nearby Carter's Camp. Soon his stock was packing into all of the area's mountain resorts from his Mount Wilson Stables.

While packing to Sturtevant's Camp, Charley passed through an oak-studded bench 600 feet (180 m) above Big Santa Anita Canyon's bottom at the San Olene Gap. With a reliable spring in adjoining San Olene Canyon (a corruption of the original Santa Oline) and the relatively flat land of an ancient slide, Chantry imagined this to be an ideal site for a small ranch. The details of his official occupation of the flat are unclear, even from John Robinson's The San Gabriels. The 1977 edition suggests that his plans for a home and orchard were thwarted by enactment of the Forest Homestead Act (1906), which forbade such development. The 1991 edition reports that he was granted a permit for 20 acres (81,000 m^{2}) in 1907, that he failed to act on his plans and that he allowed the permit to lapse, returning control to the Forest Service. Glen Owens, author of The Heritage of the Big Santa Anita believes the latter to be true and substantiates his claim with the witness of a Forest Service agricultural permit in Charley's name. In any event, Charley and his dog, Patch, did occasionally occupy a tent here, graze his stock here, and spend enough time here to have his name permanently attached to the area now known as Chantry Flat (formerly Poison Oak Flat).

Charley died in 1936, one year after Los Angeles County paved a road to his old stomping grounds from the top of Santa Anita Ave. The road in was originally planned as a highway to join the Angeles Crest Highway (State Hwy 2) at Shortcut Canyon. The Forest Service never allowed it. It would have been a largely unwelcome introduction of modern civilization and would have obliterated the charm and beauty of both the Big Santa Anita and the West Fork of the San Gabriel River. The county was permitted, however, to build a road into Winter Creek. They stopped short with a less intrusive terminus at Chantry Flat. The Civilian Conservation Corps built a campground here that was later remodeled by the Forest Service in 1958 and designated a picnic area. Also in 1958, the USFS built the existing firehouse with barracks and information center, the two 3-bedroom houses to house employees, and a water system (315,000 US gallons (1,190,000 L) capacity) drawn from a lateral well. The lateral well was later replaced by the vertical well now in use.

== The Picnic Area ==
The picnic grounds of Chantry Flat, known to locals as The Picnic Grove, are authorized for day use only. A full renovation was completed in August 2006. The site offers 35 tables, each with a charcoal barbecue; most are wheelchair accessible. Water spigots are installed throughout, and there are two flush toilet restrooms.

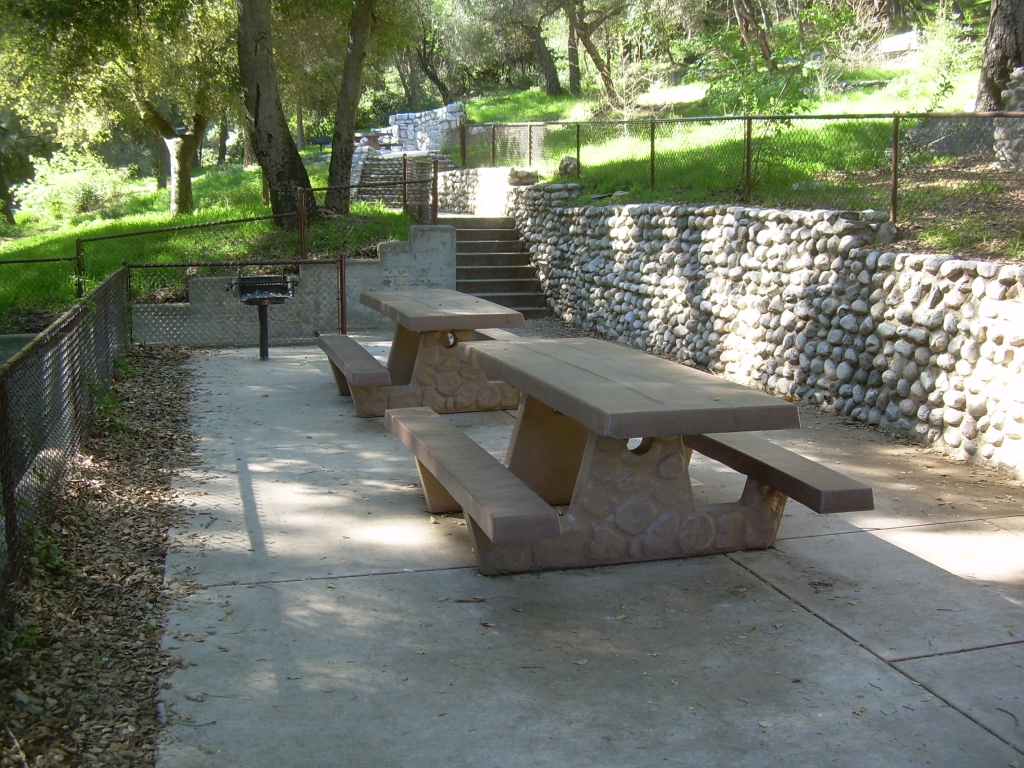
Large double picnic site

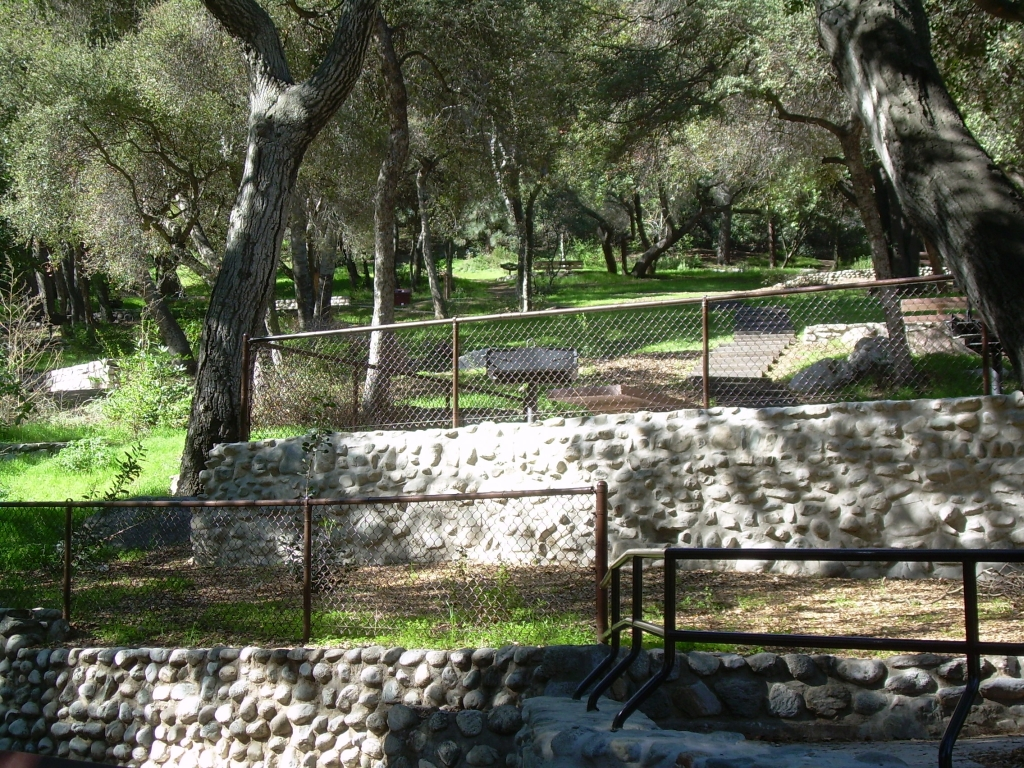
Southwest view of picnic area

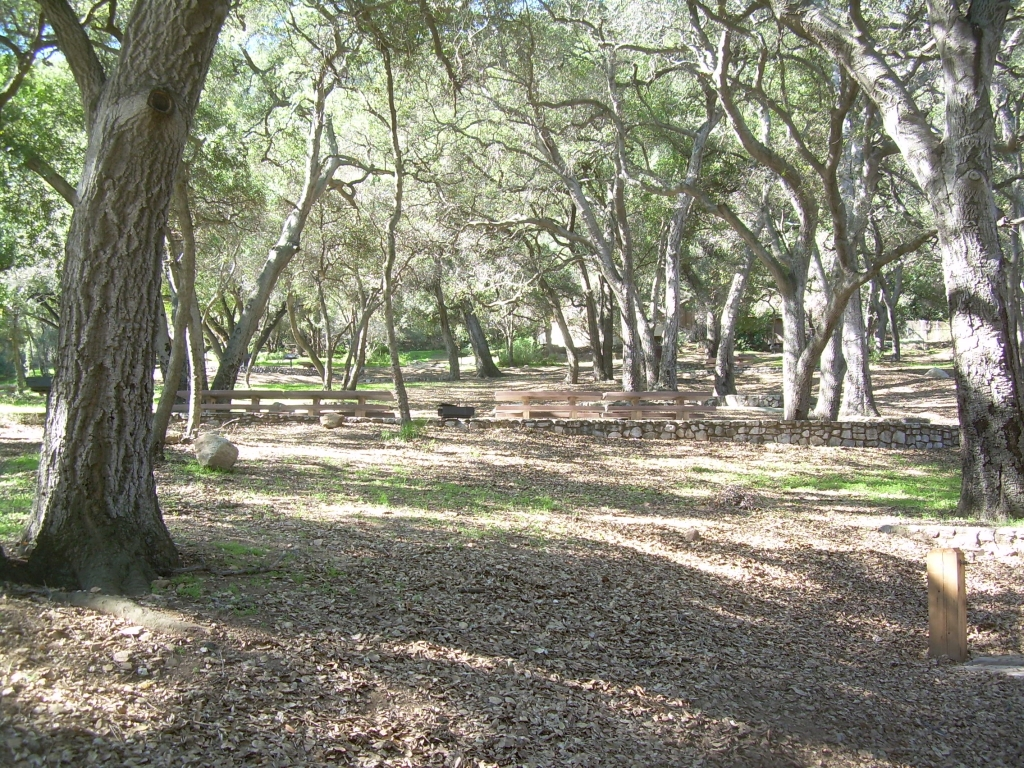
West view of picnic area

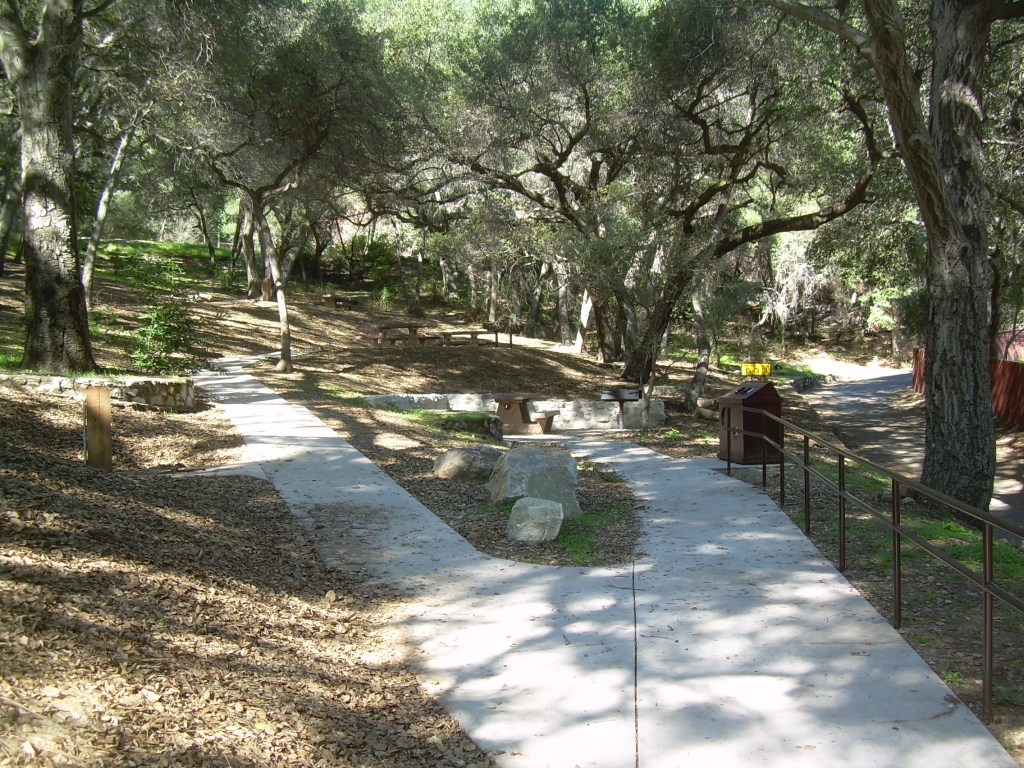
Northwest view of picnic area

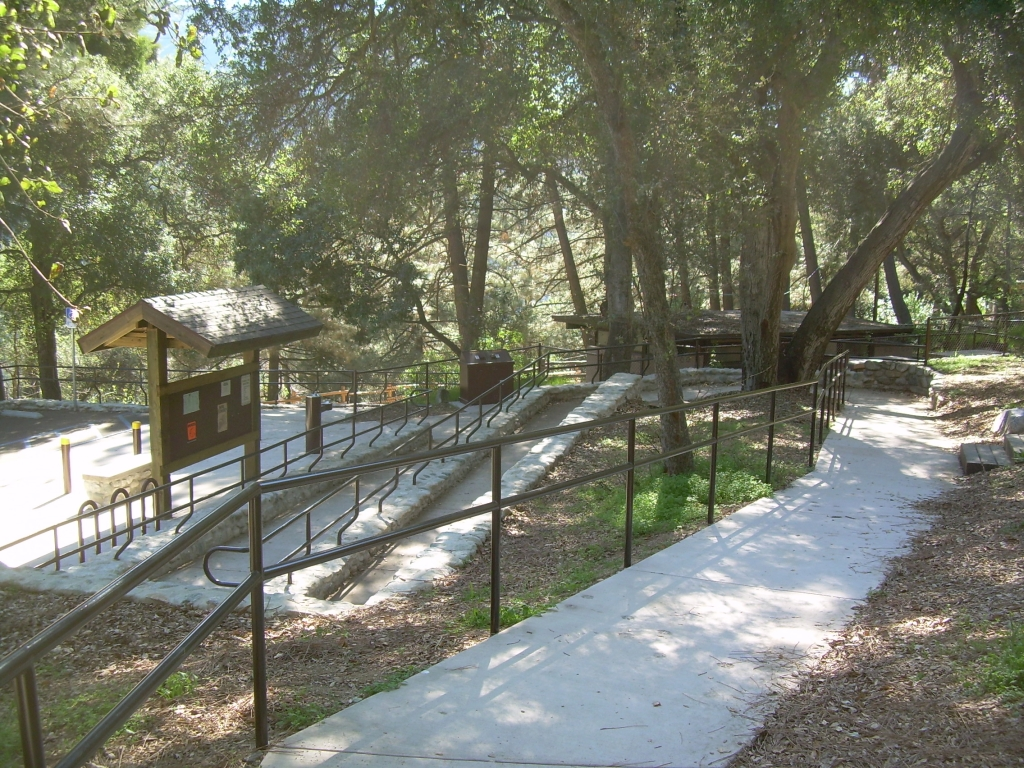
Wheelchair ramps

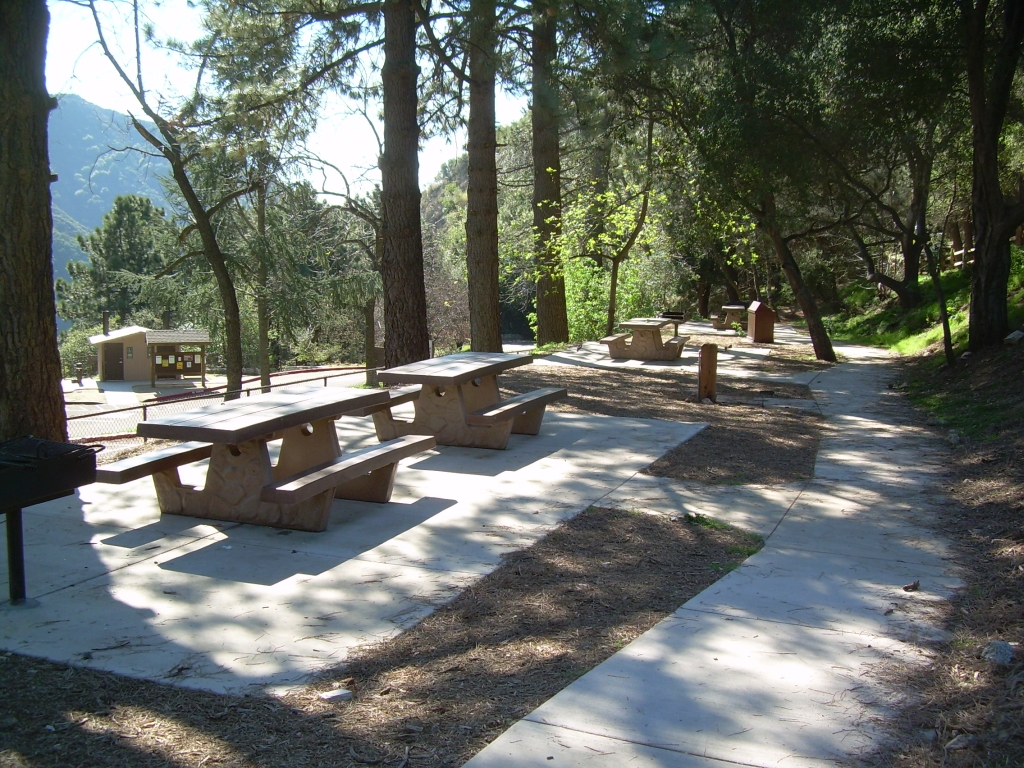
Lower picnic sites

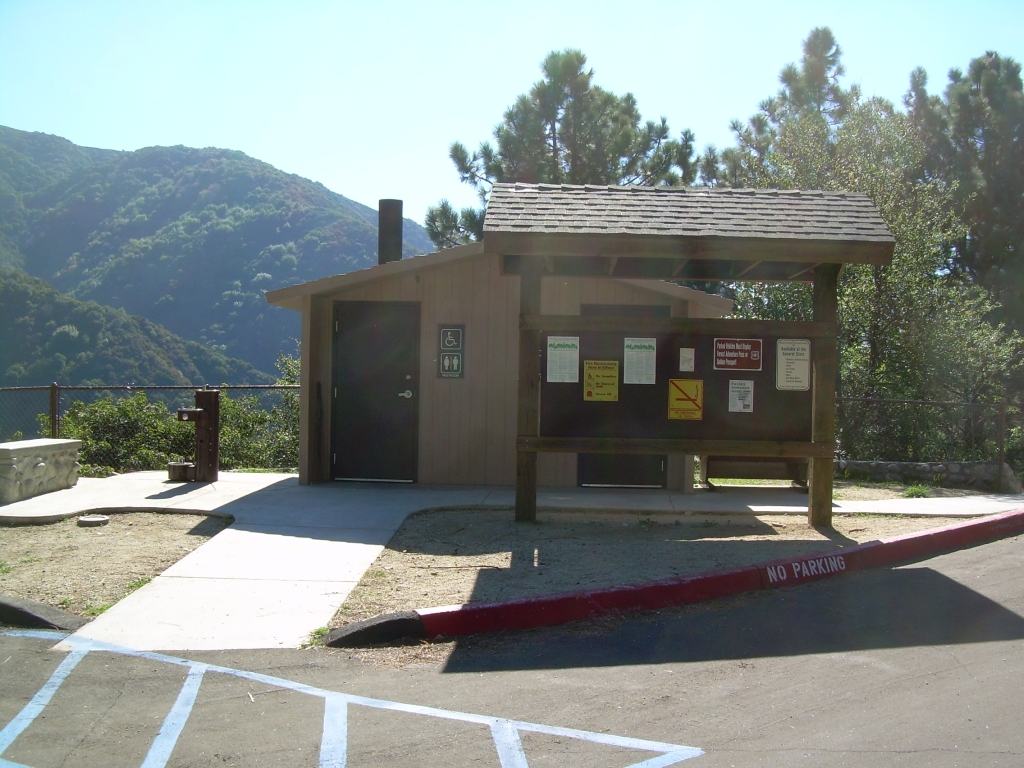
East end of Gabrielino Trail

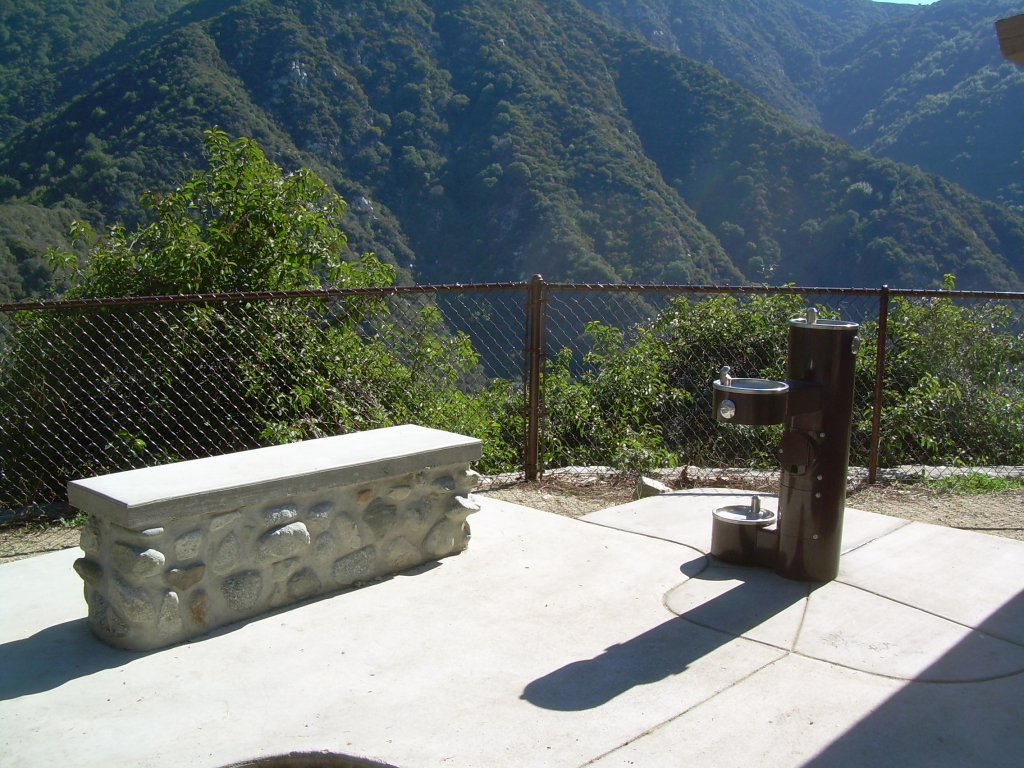
Bench with a view

== Trails ==
Several hiking and mountain biking trails are accessible from Chantry Flat. They include the Upper Winter Creek and Lower Winter Creek trail loop as well as the Sturtevant Falls trail along Santa Anita Creek, which is also the East end of the Gabrielino Trail. These trails connect with a broad network of trails throughout the San Gabriel Mountains. Most of these trails are heavily forested, as they did not burn during the Station Fire in 2009.

== Pack station ==
Adams' Pack Station is a permitted outfitter and general store that has operated at Chantry Flat since 1936. It sells the National Forest Adventure Pass, and also offers food and gear as well as additional parking for visitors. The Pack Station General Store is open to the public on weekends and holidays until 5:00 PM.

== Parking fee ==
The road to Chantry Flat is open daily from 6:00 AM to 8:00 PM. Car parking at Chantry Flats, and many places in the Angeles National Forest, requires a National Forest Adventure Pass. National Forest Adventure Passes may be obtained online or from forest visitor centers and local sporting good merchants. The fee is $5.00 a day or $30 for a yearly pass. The parking lot fills quickly in the morning on the weekends.

== Driving Directions ==
From the Foothill Freeway (I-210) take the Santa Anita Avenue exit north. Follow Santa Anita Ave. through the residential neighborhood until it ends at the foot of the mountains. Pass the yellow pipe gate and continue 3 miles (4.8 km) into the mountains to the end of Santa Anita Canyon Road.

== See also ==
- Henninger Flats
