= Rio Hondo (California) =

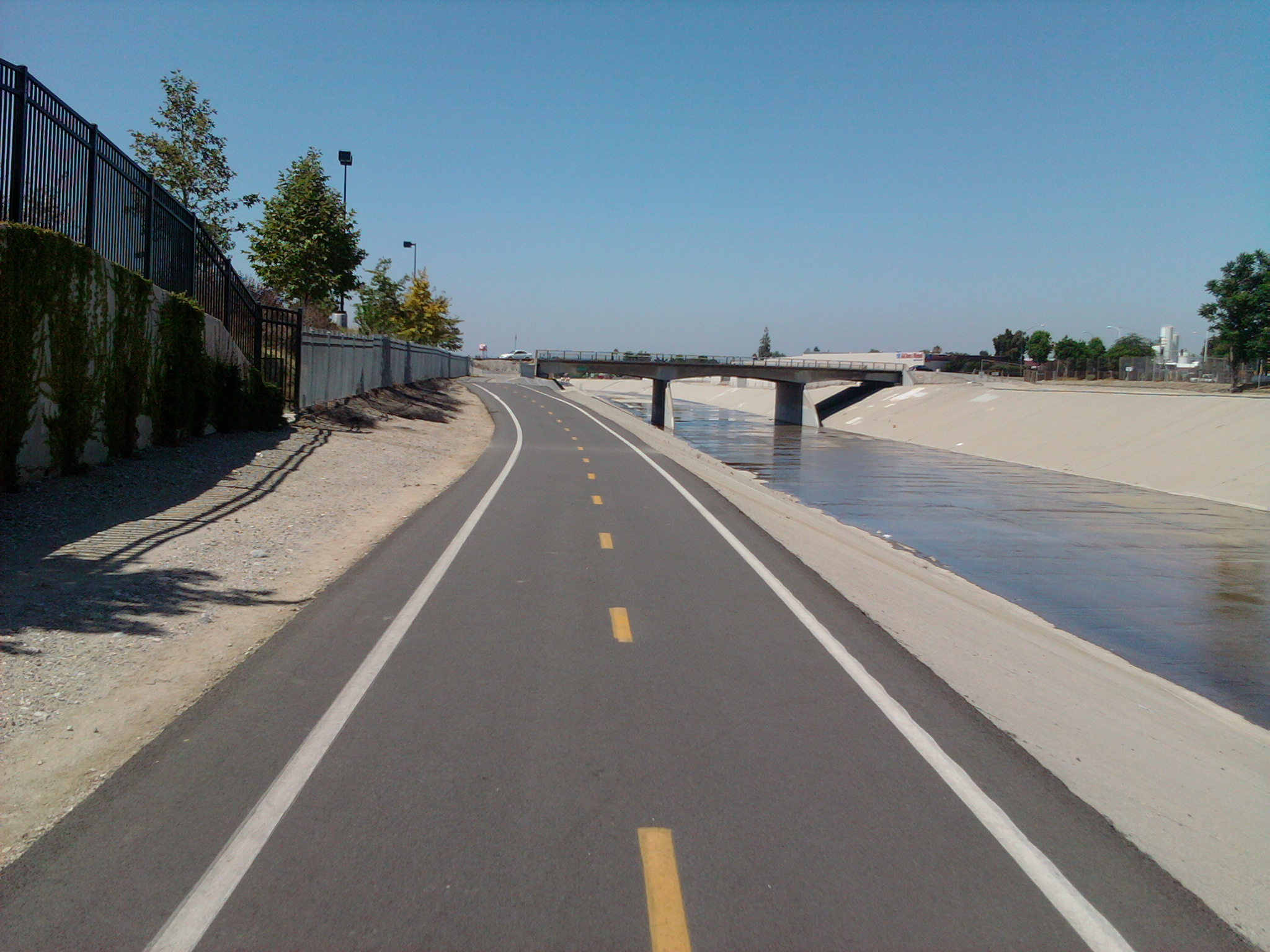

Location
- Country: United States
- State: California

Physical characteristics
- Source: Santa Anita Creek
  - location: Irwindale, San Gabriel Valley
  - coordinates: 34°05′51″N 118°01′16″W
  - elevation: 320 ft (98 m)
- Mouth: Los Angeles River
  - location: South Gate
  - coordinates: 33°55′56″N 118°10′30″W
  - elevation: 79 ft (24 m)
- Length: 16.4 mi (26.4 km)
- Basin size: 143 mi^{2} (370 km^{2})
- Discharge
  - location: below Whittier Narrows Dam
  - average: 165 cu ft/s (4.7 m^{3}/s)
  - minimum: 0 cu ft/s (0 m^{3}/s)
  - maximum: 38,800 cu ft/s (1,100 m^{3}/s)

Basin features
- Tributaries
  - right: Santa Anita Creek, Arcadia Wash, Eaton Wash, Alhambra Wash

The Rio Hondo (Spanish: Río Hondo, meaning "Deep River") is a tributary of the Los Angeles River in Los Angeles County, California, approximately 16.4 miles (26.4 km) long. As a named river, it begins in Irwindale and flows southwest to its confluence in South Gate, passing through several cities (though not the city of Los Angeles). Above Irwindale, its main stem is known as Santa Anita Creek, which extends to another 10 miles (16 km) northwards into the San Gabriel Mountains where the source, or headwaters, of the river are found.

== Background ==
The Rio Hondo has sometimes been described as a second channel of the San Gabriel River. For much of its length, the rivers flow parallel to each other about two miles (3 km) apart. Both rivers pass through the Whittier Narrows, a natural gap in the hills which form the southern boundary of the San Gabriel Valley. Here, both rivers are impounded by the Whittier Narrows Dam, which the Army Corps of Engineers describes as, "the central element of the Los Angeles County Drainage Area (LACDA) flood control system". During major storms, the outlet works at Whittier Narrows Dam can direct water to either channel, or runoff can be stored.

The Rio Hondo and San Gabriel River have both been part of a revitalization program called the Emerald Necklace. The goal of this program is to create a "necklace" of parks and reclaimed wild spaces with the two rivers. They are connected by a narrow strip in Irwindale and by Whittier Narrows to give them the appearance of a necklace if viewed from above. The project garnered broad support from organizations such as the Sierra Club along with the governments of the many cities the rivers pass through.

Most of the Rio Hondo is a concrete-lined channel to serve its primary flood control function, but in two places the river flows over open ground: the Peck Road Water Conservation Park, and the Whittier Narrows Recreation Area. Large spreading grounds for water conservation surround much of the river, and its bike paths are very popular.

The river passes through the location of the Battle of Rio San Gabriel, fought on January 8, 1847, and which resulted in a U.S. victory. Although the battle was actually fought on the west bank of the present-day Rio Hondo near where it is crossed by Washington Boulevard, the battle is named after the San Gabriel, which at that time flowed along these banks. A flood in 1867 caused the San Gabriel to change course, which it retains at present. The old San Gabriel was renamed the Rio Hondo after this flood. In Downey, California, the Rio Hondo was once known as the "Old River", because it was the old course of the San Gabriel River. The Old River School was named for it, and Old River School Road was named for the school. The "New River" is the present course of the San Gabriel River.

== Legacy ==
The Rio Hondo College and Rio Hondo Preparatory School were named after the river.

In what is now the Bosque del Rio Hondo Natural Area, Marrano Beach was born on the riverfront property of El Rancho de Don Daniel, a Mexican land grant from the nineteenth century that had belonged the Repetto-Alvarado family, a prominent family of California land owners. El Rancho de Don Daniel encompassed riparian wetlands and ponds surrounding the Rio Hondo, which flowed year-round, and the seasonal Mission Creek. With few opportunities for respite after toiling in the fields, Mexican-American residents of the local barrios cultivated recreational lifestyles around this section of the river and embraced it as a bucolic resource for community and family activities.

== Parks and recreation ==
The Rio Hondo River Trail is a multi-use trail that runs parallel to Rio Hondo through the San Gabriel Valley. The northern end starts along the reservoir at the Peck Road Water Conservation Park and continues along the channel to Whittier Narrows Recreation Area. The trail is 15.6 miles long. Allowed uses include hiking, mountain biking, horseback riding and walking dogs on leash. There is also bird and wildlife watching.

== Crossings ==
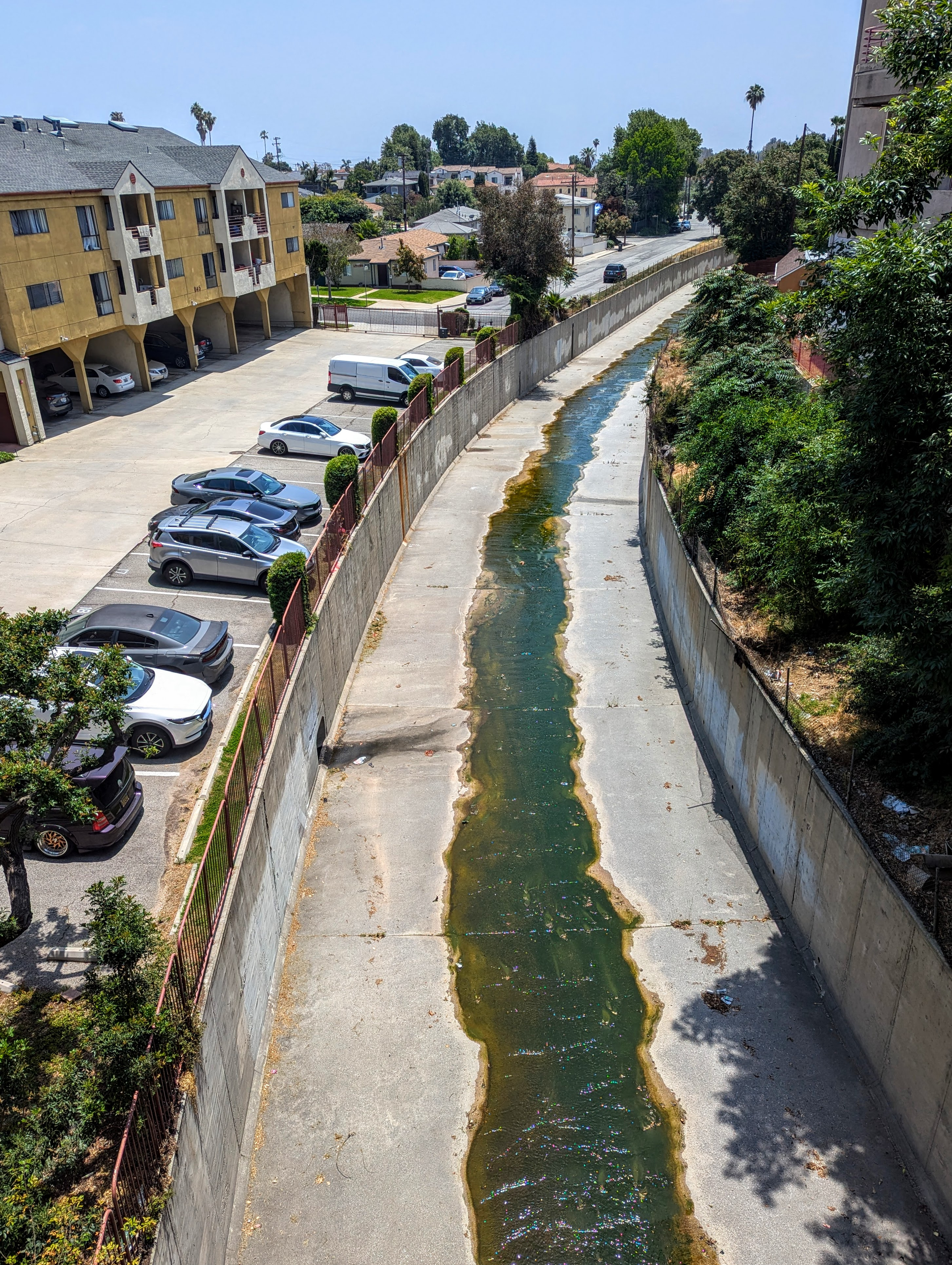
The tributary Alhambra Wash, viewed from the south side of Main Street, Alhambra

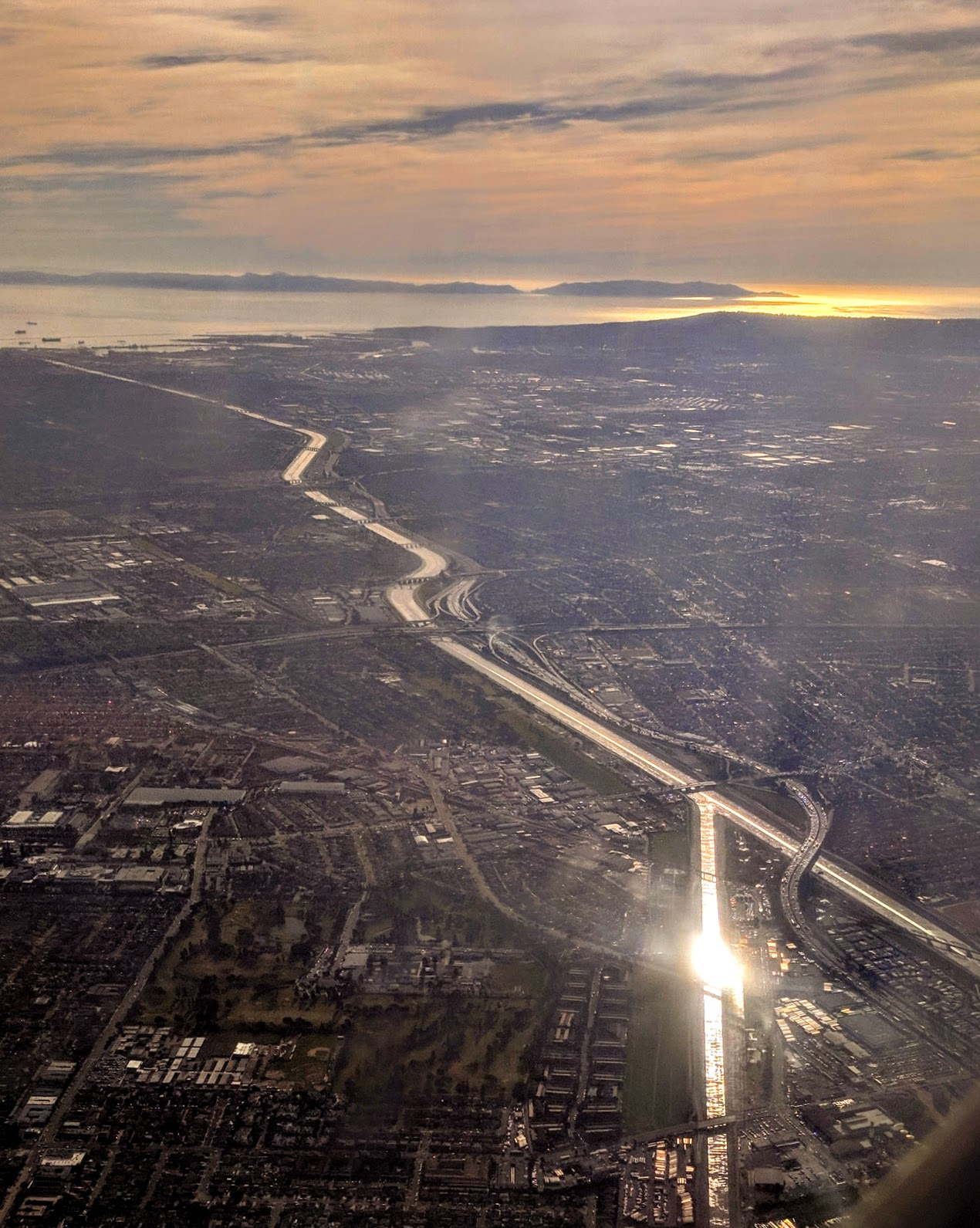
Aerial view from the north of the Los Angeles River, with the Rio Hondo (bottom, with reflection) flowing into it. Santa Catalina Island is visible in the distance.

From mouth to source (year built in parentheses):

- Railroad
- Garfield Avenue (1957)
- Southern Avenue / Stewart and Gray Road (1951)
- Firestone Boulevard (1933)
- Railroad
- Rio Hondo Bicycle Path
- Florence Avenue (1953)
- Suva Street (1954)
- I-5 - Santa Ana Freeway (1953)
- Telegraph Road (1951)
- Railroad
- East Slauson Avenue (1954)
- Railroad: BNSF Railway (former Santa Fe Railway)/Amtrak (Pacific Surfliner/Southwest Chief)/Metrolink (Orange County Line/91/Perris Valley Line)
- Washington Boulevard (1941)
- Bridge to Rio Hondo Bicycle Path
- Railroad: Union Pacific Railroad (ex-LA&SL), Metrolink Riverside Line
- Whittier Boulevard (1921)
- East Beverly Boulevard (1952)
- Whittier Narrows Dam
- San Gabriel Boulevard (1982)
- SR 60 - Pomona Freeway (1966)
- Garvey Avenue (1936)
- Rosemead Boulevard / CA-164 (1937)
- I-10 - San Bernardino Freeway (1956)
- El Monte Busway (1972)
- Railroad: Metrolink San Bernardino Line
- Valley Boulevard (1956)
- Railroad: Union Pacific Railroad former Southern Pacific Railroad/Amtrak Sunset Limited
- Lower Azusa Road (1959)
- Santa Anita Avenue (1959)
- Rio Hondo Bicycle Path at Peck Road Park Lake

== See also ==
- Eaton Wash
- Rancho Paso de Bartolo
- Rio (disambiguation)
- Ríos (disambiguation)
