= Frank G. Bonelli Regional Park =

Park in Los Angeles County, California

Coordinates: 34°05′05″N 117°48′13″W

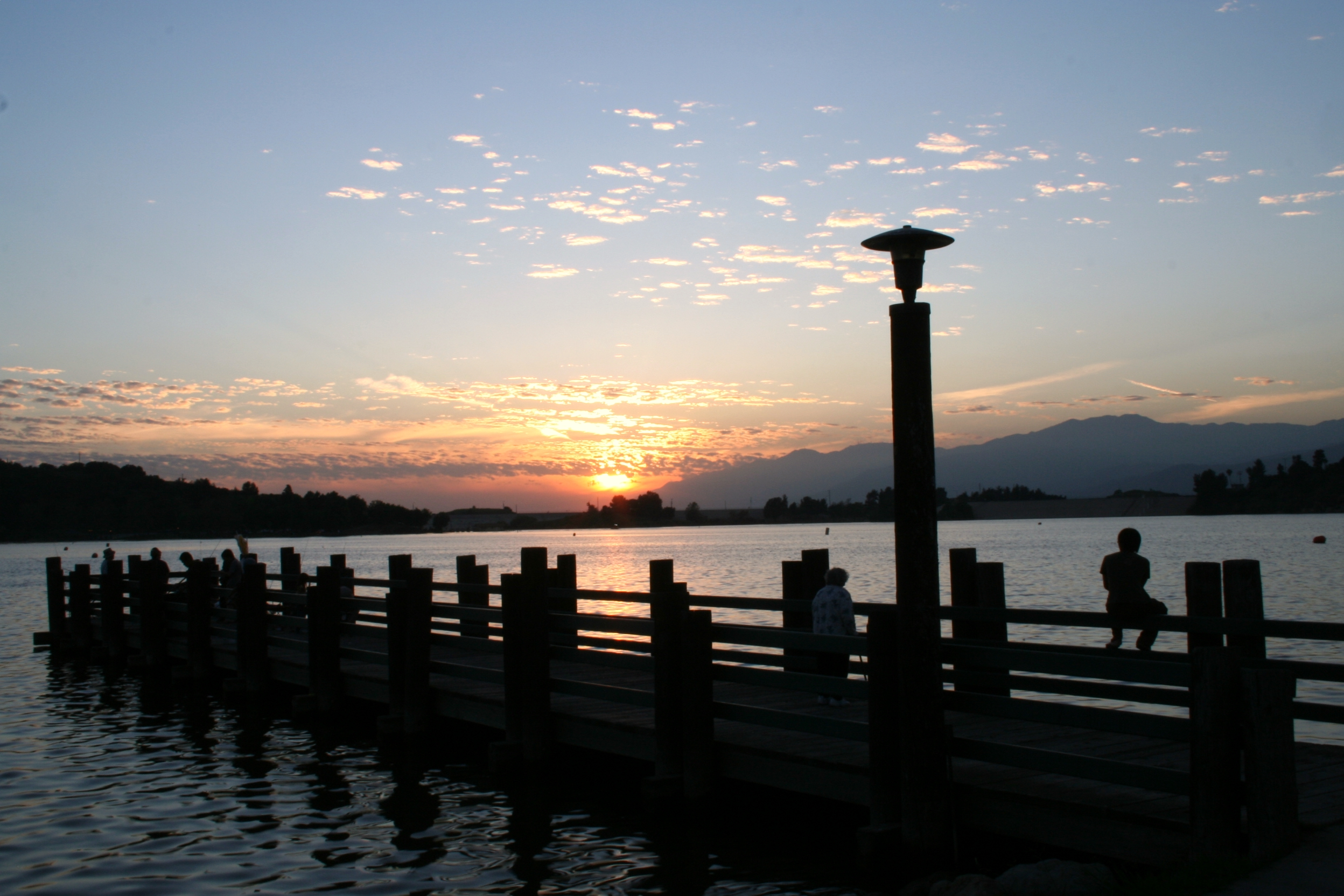
Sunset dock at Puddingstone Reservoir

Frank G. Bonelli Regional Park is a man-made recreational area in San Dimas, California, United States, in Los Angeles County. It is near the Orange Freeway (State Route 57), the Foothill Freeway (Interstate 210) and the San Bernardino Freeway (Interstate 10). It is named after former LA County Supervisor Frank G. Bonelli.

The park contains a 250-acre (1.0 km^{2}) lake called Puddingstone Reservoir, which provides a place for fishing, swimming, sailing, wind surfing, boating, and jet skiing, along with a waterfall.

Other recreation in the park includes kayak rentals (by Wheel Fun), RV campgrounds adjacent to the park (separate facility), six playgrounds, barbecues, hiking, biking, family picnic areas, and private picnic areas for company picnics, company parties, church picnics and other group events or gatherings. The private areas are run exclusively by James Events, which has a contract with Los Angeles County Parks and Recreation. However, families and small groups may contact the park directly to reserve other areas of the park.

The park is adjacent to one of the area's largest water parks, Raging Waters.

Due to Los Angeles County's budget cuts, the park became one of six regional parks closed on Mondays and Tuesdays, starting from June 30, 2025.
