= Santa Anita Canyon =

Landform, California, U.S.

Coordinates: 34°10′18.12″N 118°01′55.20″W

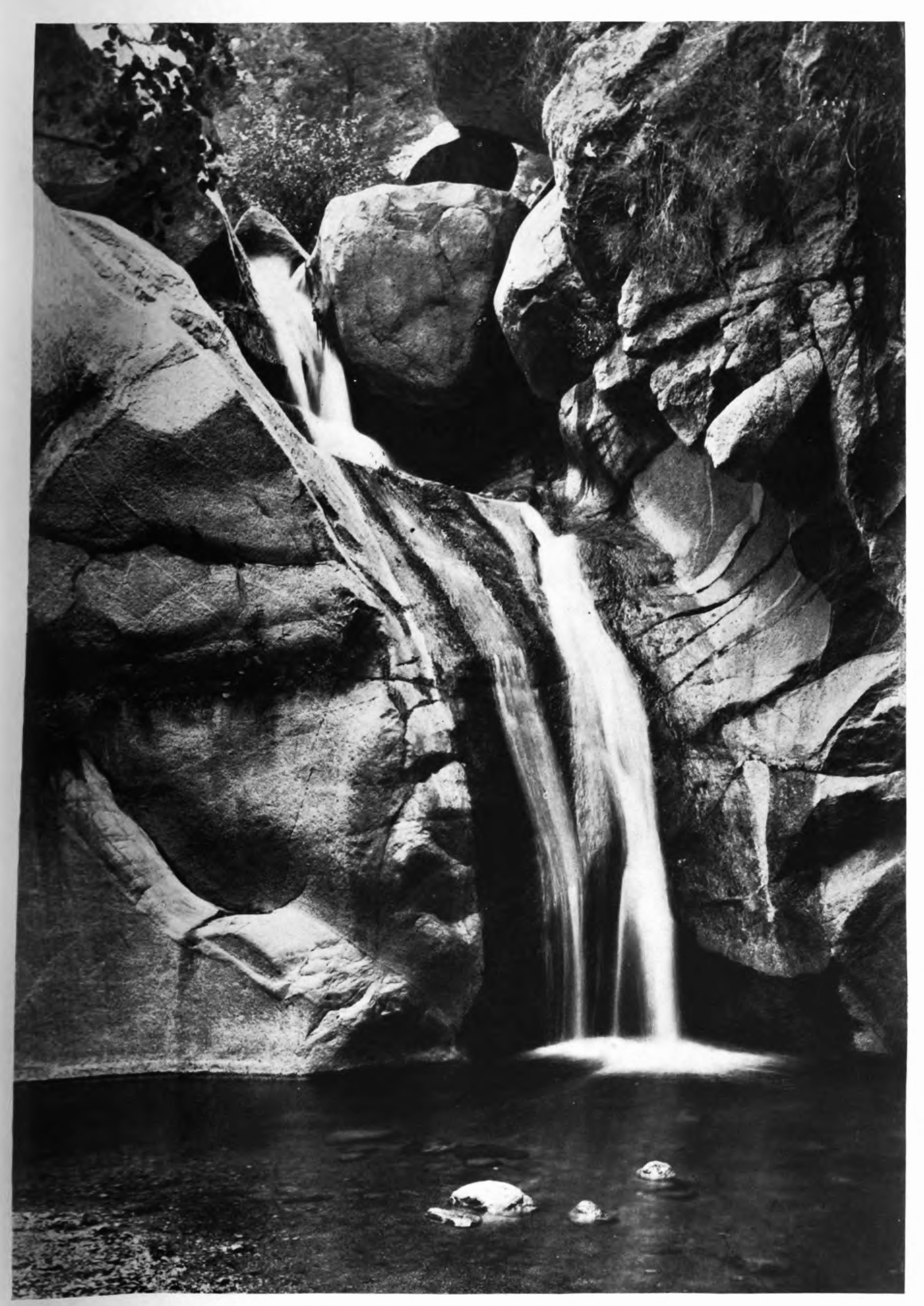
Twin Falls, Santa Anita Canyon, Views of Los Angeles, 1914–1915 by Frank W. Staley

Santa Anita Canyon is a canyon in the San Gabriel Mountains, within the cities of Sierra Madre, Monrovia, and Arcadia in Los Angeles County, California.

== Geography ==
The 'Big Santa Anita Canyon' with Santa Anita Creek is part of the watershed of the Rio Hondo, which flows from the mountains through the San Gabriel Valley.

The Santa Anita Dam and Santa Anita reservoir-flood control basin lies near the mouth of the canyon. The community of Big Santa Anita Canyon is below.

== Recreation ==
Santa Anita Canyon Road, constructed in the 1930s, provides access from Arcadia to the Chantry Flat Recreation Area and the Pack Station, in the Angeles National Forest. Trails lead to Sturtevant Falls and other features.

== See also ==
- Chantry Flat
- Marie Riedeselle, lived in a cabin in Santa Anita Canyon in 1909
