= Si Racha (disambiguation) =

Si Racha is a town in Chonburi Province, Thailand.

Si Racha, Sri Racha or Sriracha may also refer to:

- Si Racha district, the district surrounding the town of Si Racha, Thailand
- Sriracha, a sauce named after the town, which has become a genericized term for several chili sauces
  - Sriracha sauce (Huy Fong Foods), a specific variety of Sriracha sauce by Huy Fong Foods
    - Sriracha (film), a 2013 documentary about Huy Fong Foods' Sriracha sauce
- Sriracha F.C., now Thawiwatthana F.C., a football club based in Si Racha, Thailand
- "Sriracha", a 2016 song by Tech N9ne from The Storm

== See also ==
- Siriraj (disambiguation)
- 3Racha, a trio sub-unit of South Korean boy group Stray Kids
