= Santa Fe Dam =

Dam in Irwindale, California, U.S.

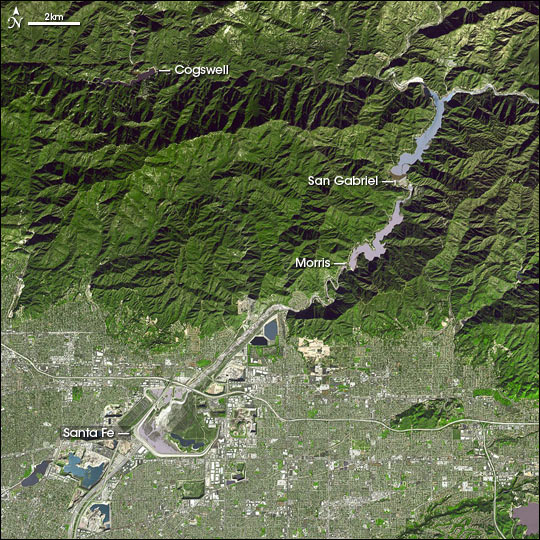
- Satellite view of four of the five major dams on the San Gabriel River system. Santa Fe Dam is the large structure on the bottom left (southwest).
- Interactive map of Santa Fe Dam
- Country: United States
- Location: Irwindale, California
- Coordinates: 34°06′57″N 117°58′21″W
- Construction began: 1941; 85 years ago
- Opening date: 1949; 77 years ago
- Owners: U.S. Army Corps of Engineers, Los Angeles District

Dam and spillways
- Type of dam: Earthfill
- Impounds: San Gabriel River
- Height: 92 ft (28 m)
- Length: 23,800 ft (7,300 m)
- Dam volume: 12,033,000 yd^{3} (9,200,000 m^{3})
- Spillway type: Uncontrolled overflow
- Spillway capacity: 200,000 cu ft/s (5,700 m^{3}/s)

Reservoir
- Creates: Santa Fe Flood Control Basin
- Total capacity: 45,409 acre⋅ft (56,011,000 m^{3})
- Catchment area: 236 mi^{2} (610 km^{2})
- Surface area: 1,000 acres (400 ha)

Power Station
- Hydraulic head: 87 ft (27 m)

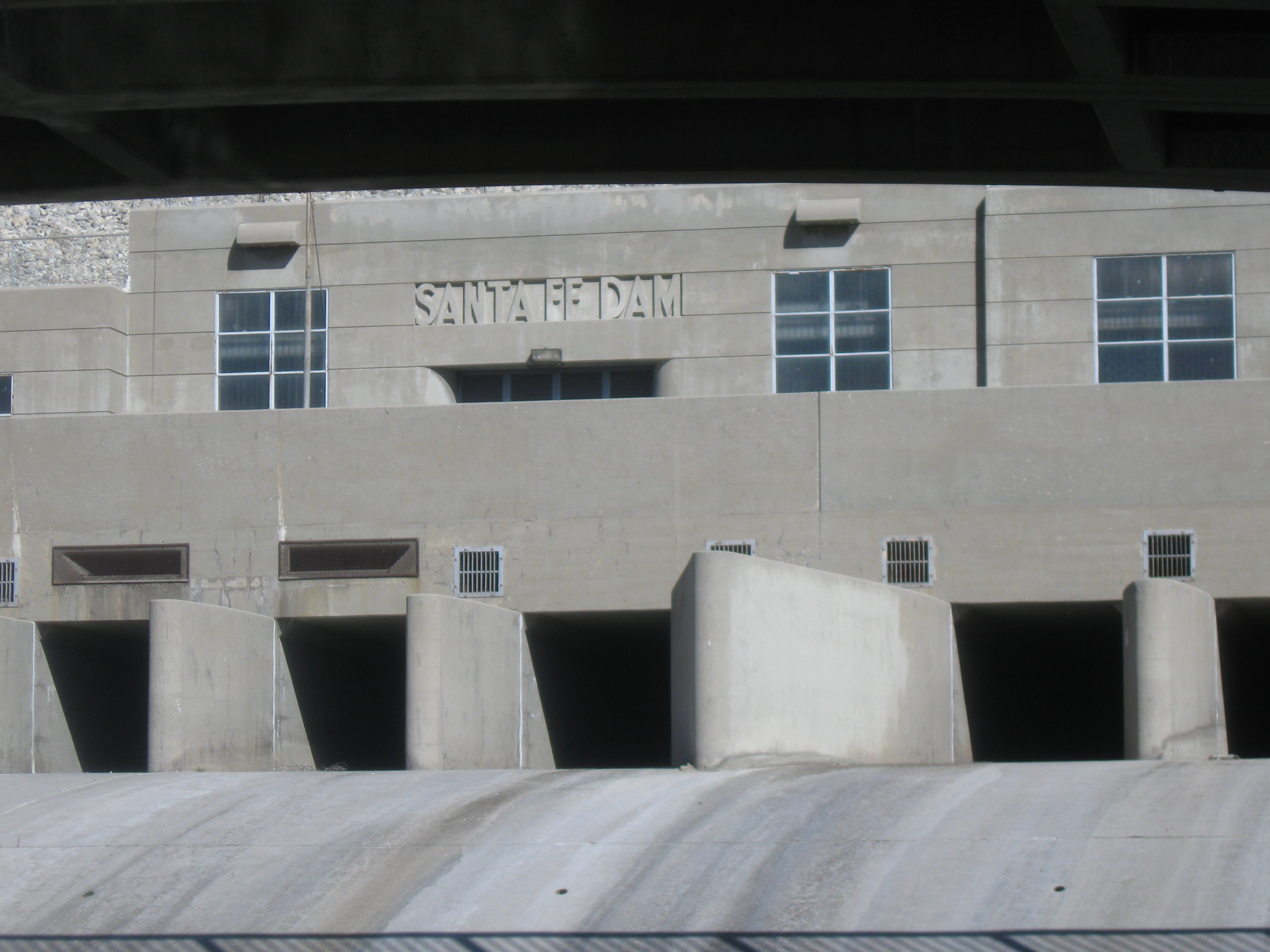
Face of Santa Fe Dam

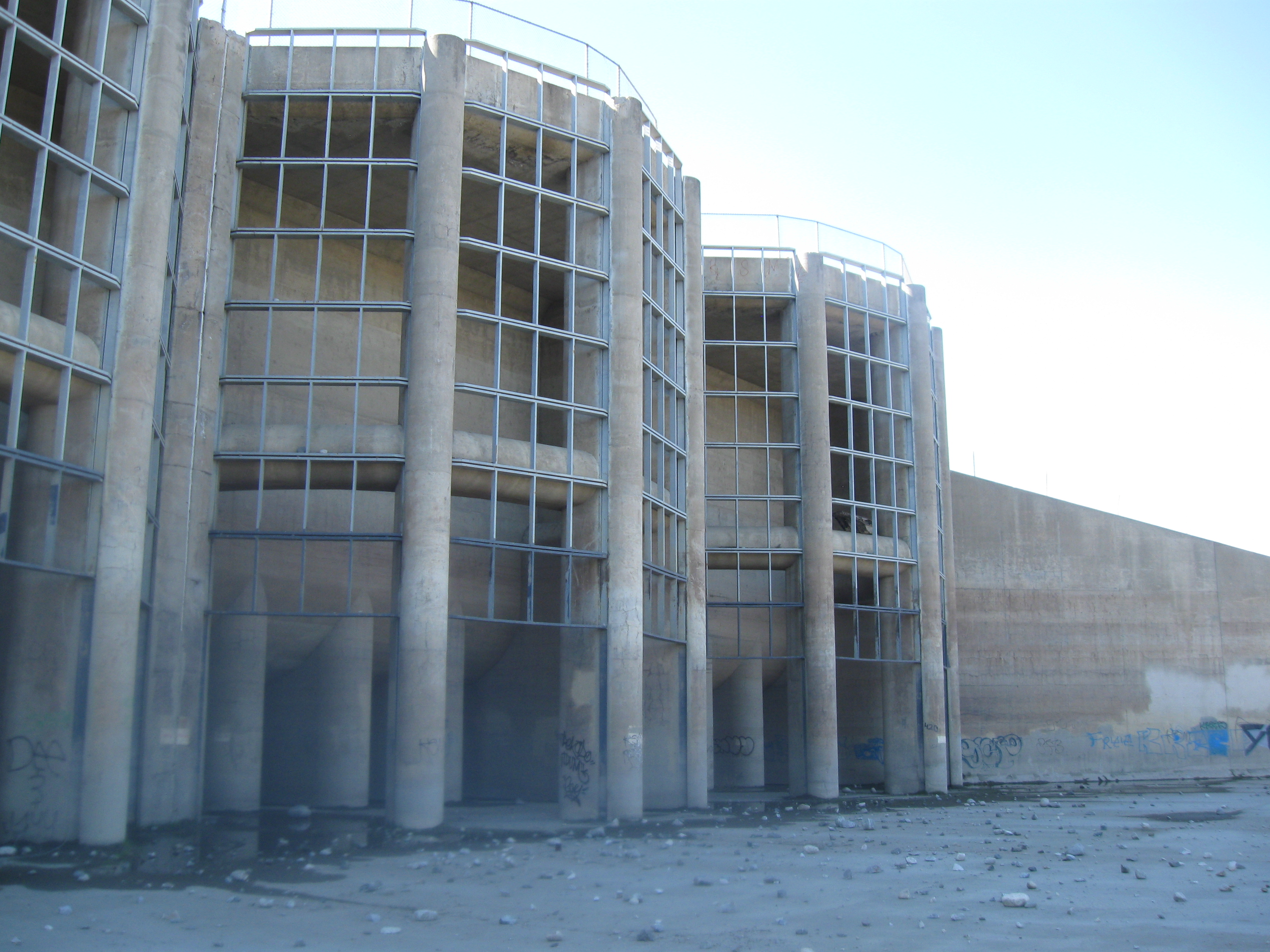
Detail of trash rack before the inlet to Santa Fe Dam

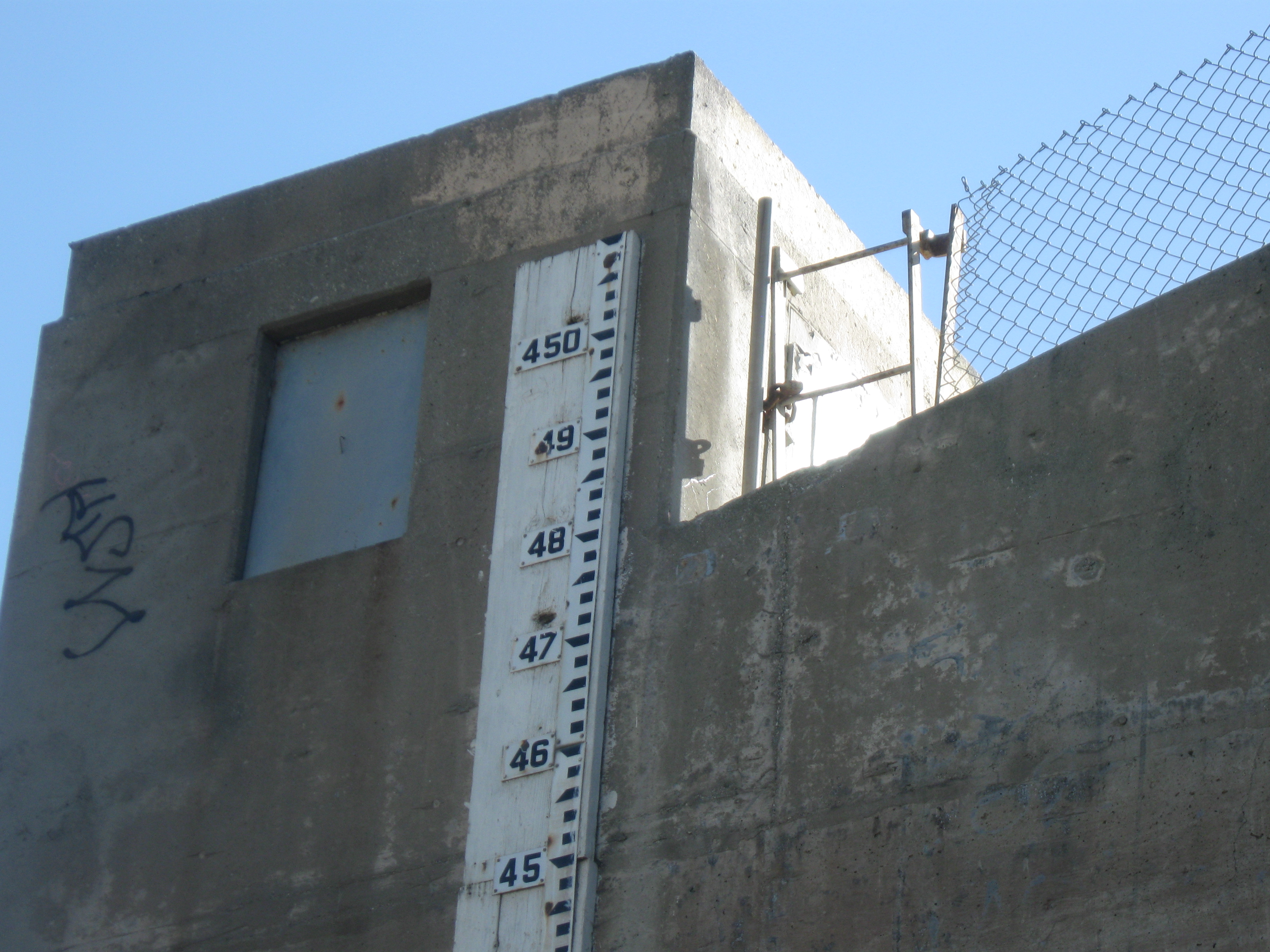
Indicator measuring water level behind Santa Fe Dam

Santa Fe Dam is a flood-control dam on the San Gabriel River located in Irwindale in Los Angeles County, California, United States. For most of the year, the 92-foot (28 m)-high dam and its reservoir lie empty, but can hold more than 45,000 acre-feet (56,000,000 m^{3}) of water during major storms. During the dry season, the basin behind the dam is used for groundwater recharge, as well as various recreational activities.

== History ==
Construction of the dam began in 1941 under the U.S. Army Corps of Engineers (USACE), mainly in response to major floods on the river in 1938; however, work stopped in 1943 and did not resume again until 1946 due to the unlucky intervention of a major flood and World War II. The dam embankment and spillway were completed in early 1947, and the entire project was finished in January 1949 with the installation of the spillway gates, four months ahead of schedule. The primary mission of the dam was to serve as a flood risk management tool to the communities along the San Gabriel River downstream of the Basin.

=== Santa Fe Dam Recreational Area ===
The Los Angeles County Board of Supervisors passed a resolution in 1955 stating that the county wished to develop recreation amenities in the basin, but funds committed elsewhere precluded recreation development at the basin until 1974. A Master Plan was prepared by the corps in 1975. It described recreation amenities proposed to be cost shared equally between the corps and the county and to be maintained by the county. The majority of the existing recreation amenities in the basin were built between 1976 and 1984. The recreation amenities constructed during this time period were jointly developed by the corps and county on a cost shared basis. The original lease with the county was signed in May 1976 with a term of 50 years. In 1984 at the completion of the recreation amenities, the lease was amended to extend through December 2036. A master plan update in 1995 reflected 1995 conditions and proposed additional recreation development.

During most of the year, the empty reservoir behind the Santa Fe Dam is used for recreational purposes. The Santa Fe Dam Recreation Area, located in Irwindale, is an 836-acre (338 ha) multi-use facility located behind the dam.

The park's main feature is a 70-acre (28 ha) lake with boat rentals, fishing, a swimming beach, hiking trails, cycling trails, and California native plants and chaparral habitat conservation areas.

== Statistics ==
Santa Fe Dam is a horseshoe-shaped curved gravity structure located on the alluvial flood plain of the San Gabriel River roughly 3 mi (4.8 km) downstream from the San Gabriel Mountains. The dam is of zoned earthen construction and has a structural height of 92 feet (28 m), standing 87 feet (27 m) above the riverbed. It is one of the largest dams by volume in the United States, containing more than 12,000,000 cubic yards (9,200,000 m^{3}) of material in an embankment more than four miles long.

The reservoir formed behind Santa Fe has a maximum capacity of 45,409 acre⋅ft (56,011,000 m^{3}) at spillway crest, 21 feet (6.4 m) below the top of the dam itself. Water releases from the dam are controlled by two sets of gates. The outlet works, located at the base of the dam, are fed by sixteen 7 ft (2.1 m) diameter conduits capable of discharging 17,000 cu ft/s (480 m^{3}/s). The emergency spillway is located to the northwest of the dam and comprises a concrete overflow weir with a capacity of 200,000 cu ft/s (5,700 m^{3}/s).

== Operations ==
The dam functions as a dry dam, with its reservoir empty most of the year. During large floods, water is stored behind the dam and then released as quickly as possible without exceeding the capacity of downstream levees. Releases from Santa Fe are coordinated with Whittier Narrows Dam 10 miles (16 km) downstream, as well as the upstream Cogswell, San Gabriel and Morris Dams, to provide flood protection to cities along the San Gabriel River. By capacity, it is the second largest dam along the San Gabriel, after Whittier Narrows.

During the summer and autumn months, most of the water flowing into the Santa Fe reservoir is diverted into the Santa Fe Spreading Grounds, located near the upper end of the flood control basin, helping to recharge groundwater levels in the San Gabriel Valley. Excess inflow can be sent to the Peck Road Water Conservation Area and additional spreading grounds along the Rio Hondo. As a result, the San Gabriel River channel below the dam is often bone dry. Most of the spreading grounds are owned and maintained by the Los Angeles County Department of Public Works, reclaiming an average of 110,000 acre⋅ft (140,000,000 m^{3}) of water each year.

== See also ==
- List of reservoirs and dams in California
