= Northern California Renaissance Faire =

Renaissance faire in the United States

- Genre: Renaissance fair
- Dates: mid-September – mid-October
- Locations: Casa de Fruta, Hollister, California
- Coordinates: 36.9959°N 121.3750°W
- Inaugurated: 2004 (orig. 1967)
- Attendance: 150,000 (average)
- Area: 11 acres (45,000 m^{2})
- Website: www.norcalrenfaire.com

The Northern California Renaissance Faire, owned by Play Faire Productions is a Renaissance faire in California located in Hollister about 90 miles southeast of San Francisco. The Renaissance Festival typically runs on weekends from mid-September to mid-October. It consists of five or six weekends depending on the year. It is set in the fictional village of "Willingtown" in Derbyshire, England during the reign of Queen Elizabeth I in the mid-late 16th Century.

== Features ==
The faire hosts over 200 artisans and six stages of non stop shows. A cast of 1000 performers fill the streets in costumes of the era. Gate 6 at Casa de Fruta is the entrance to the faire. The faire showcases two jousting matches every day of the faire. There is also a concert held every Saturday at 6pm as the faire closes.

=== Themed Weekends ===
Each of the six weekends of the festival take on a different theme, influencing the performances, costumes, food, drink, art, shops, contests, and games throughout the festival grounds.

- Opening Weekend
- Pirate theme
- Cottagecore
- Oktoberfest
- Carnevale & Masquerade
- Halloween Fantasy

=== History ===
The first Renaissance Faire was started by Phyllis Patterson in 1963 in Agoura Hills, California, and in 1967 the Pattersons brought it to Northern California. Originally it was located in China Camp State Park in Marin County but by 1970 it had moved to Novato. In 1994 the Pattersons sold the faire to the Renaissance Entertainment Corporation, and subsequently it moved to Vacaville in 1999. The location at Black Point in Novato was replaced by a housing development and golf course. (StoneTree Golf Club)

Then, hoping to secure a long term lease that would allow them to maintain structures in place year round, in 2002 the faire moved again to Casa de Fruta in Hollister. However after two seasons, at the end of 2003 they announced the company would be shutting down operation of the faire because the profits were not substantial enough. Not content with this, in early 2004 Faire participants led a campaign to raise money and started the first participant-owned and operated renaissance faire via the corporation Play Faire Productions. They were successful and the Faire reopened in September 2004, where it has continued to operate since.

The faire was canceled in 2020 due to COVID-19. It returned in 2021.
