= Sriracha (film) =

- Movie poster
- Directed by: Griffin Hammond
- Written by: Griffin Hammond
- Starring: Randy Clemens; Jordan Crowder; Harold Dieterle; Oz du Soleil; Adam Holliday; Jet Tila; David Tran; Craig Underwood; Kevin Strahle
- Edited by: Griffin Hammond
- Music by: Roy Magnuson
- Release date: 11 December 2013
- Running time: 33 minutes
- Country: United States
- Language: English
- Budget: approx. $23,009

Sriracha is a 2013 American documentary film directed by Griffin Hammond. The film features David Tran discussing the origins of his Huy Fong Foods sriracha sauce.

== Release ==
On December 11, 2013, the film was released to Vimeo digitally for the price of five US dollars initially.

The film was officially selected at a number of film festivals across the United States and other countries.

=== Reception ===
L.V. Anderson of Slate gave the film a mixed review, criticizing the main focus on the public's opinion of sriracha sauce, but praised the informational aspects of the film. He closed his review saying, "Is [the film] worth $5 and half an hour of your time? I guess it depends on how much you love sriracha." Maria Godoy of NPR described the film as, "a less-than-rhapsodic view of the sauce," citing back to Anderson's review from Slate. She also stated, "...such quibbles are unlikely to deter die-hard Sriracha lovers from watching Hammond's film. After all, if you're the type to snatch up Sriracha-flavored lip balm or have ever felt tempted to tattoo that rooster label on your leg, then why not shell out the five bucks it costs to stream this movie ode to your savory beloved on your screen?" Joshua David Stein of Eater.com gave the film a two out of five star rating, criticizing the way the story was told, soundtrack, and Hammond's direction. However, he praised the film's informational aspects and cinematography.
