= Renaissance Pleasure Faire of Southern California =

Annual fair in Irwindale, California

Coordinates: 34.113594°N 117.955171°W

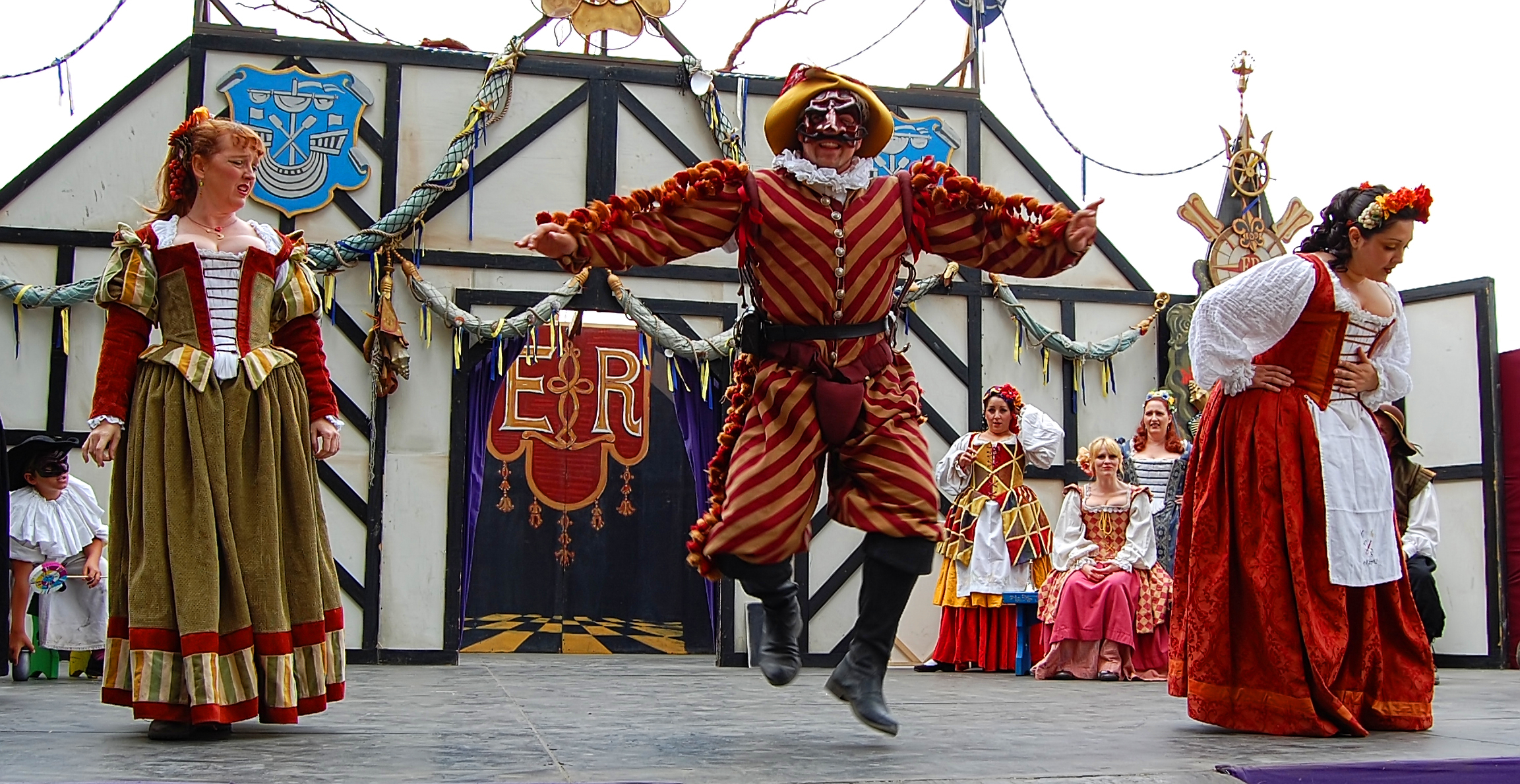
- Renaissance Pleasure Faire of Southern California, April 2011
- Genre: Renaissance faire
- Dates: April - May
- Locations: Santa Fe Dam Recreation Area; Irwindale, California
- Inaugurated: 1962
- Attendance: 250,000 (average)
- Stages: 11
- Website: www.renfair.com/socal/

The Renaissance Pleasure Faire of Southern California (RPFS) is a Renaissance faire that takes place at the Santa Fe Dam Recreation Area in Irwindale, California. Since the first one in the spring of 1963, it has been an annual event. Owned by Renaissance Entertainment Productions (REP), it is a commercial reenactment of a 1580s market faire at Port Deptford, a waterfront town in Elizabethan era England. The Faire is generally open from the first weekend of April through the weekend before Memorial Day.

== History ==
Created by Ron and Phyllis Patterson and the radio station KPFK, the first Renaissance Pleasure Faire of Southern California (RPFS) was staged at Agoura Hills in the spring of 1963. The first Renaissance Pleasure Faire of Northern California (RPFN) occurred in the fall of 1967. The nonprofit organization Living History Centre (LHC) was established in 1968 to establish the location of the Renaissance Pleasure Faire and reify the educational potentials of the public event.

In 1989, RPFS was moved to the Glen Helen Regional Park in Devore, California, and in 2005 to its present location, the Santa Fe Dam Recreation Area in Irwindale, California.

In 1999, RPFN was moved to the Nut Tree in Vacaville, California, and later was relocated again to Casa de Fruta in the Hollister/Gilroy area south of San Jose.

In 1993, RPFS was purchased by Renaissance Entertainment Corp (REC), a for-profit corporation, and later by its current owners, Renaissance Entertainment Productions (REP) (also a for-profit corporation), under which the Faire has claimed to be more family oriented.

The COVID-19 pandemic caused the faire to go on hiatus from 2020 to 2021. It resumed in April 2022.

== Attire ==
The costumes worn by official RPFS's actors are styled after those of the period of Elizabeth I of England (1558—1603) and must pass a rigorous approval process ensuring their authenticity. There are five general classes of attire: Yeoman, Merchant, Gentry, Nobility and Military. Other cultures represented include Scottish/Irish Highlanders, Germanic Landsknechts, Italians, Spaniards, and various Arabian cultures. There are also performance groups such as mongers, Puritans, adventurers and inventors, which are organized into guilds. Patrons are encouraged to wear Renaissance-inspired costumes, but are not required to adhere to the Elizabethan period. They are also welcomed to participate by dressing up to join the fun on various themed weekends. (i.e. RenCon, Pirates, Heroes & Villains, etc...) Recent themed weekends include categories such as "time traveler weekend" which suggest patrons attend in costume from any time period and any location in the world. While this broadens the scope of potential patron interest, it may detract from the Elizabethan tone of the setting.

== Performers and attendees ==
Notable performers and artisans that have attended the Faires:

- Buck Kartalian, as "Hercules Magnificus", 1971

== See also ==
- New York Renaissance Faire
- Northern California Renaissance Faire
- List of Renaissance and Medieval fairs
- Jousting
- Society for Creative Anachronism
- List of open-air and living history museums in the United States
