= Irwindale, California =

City in California, United States

- City
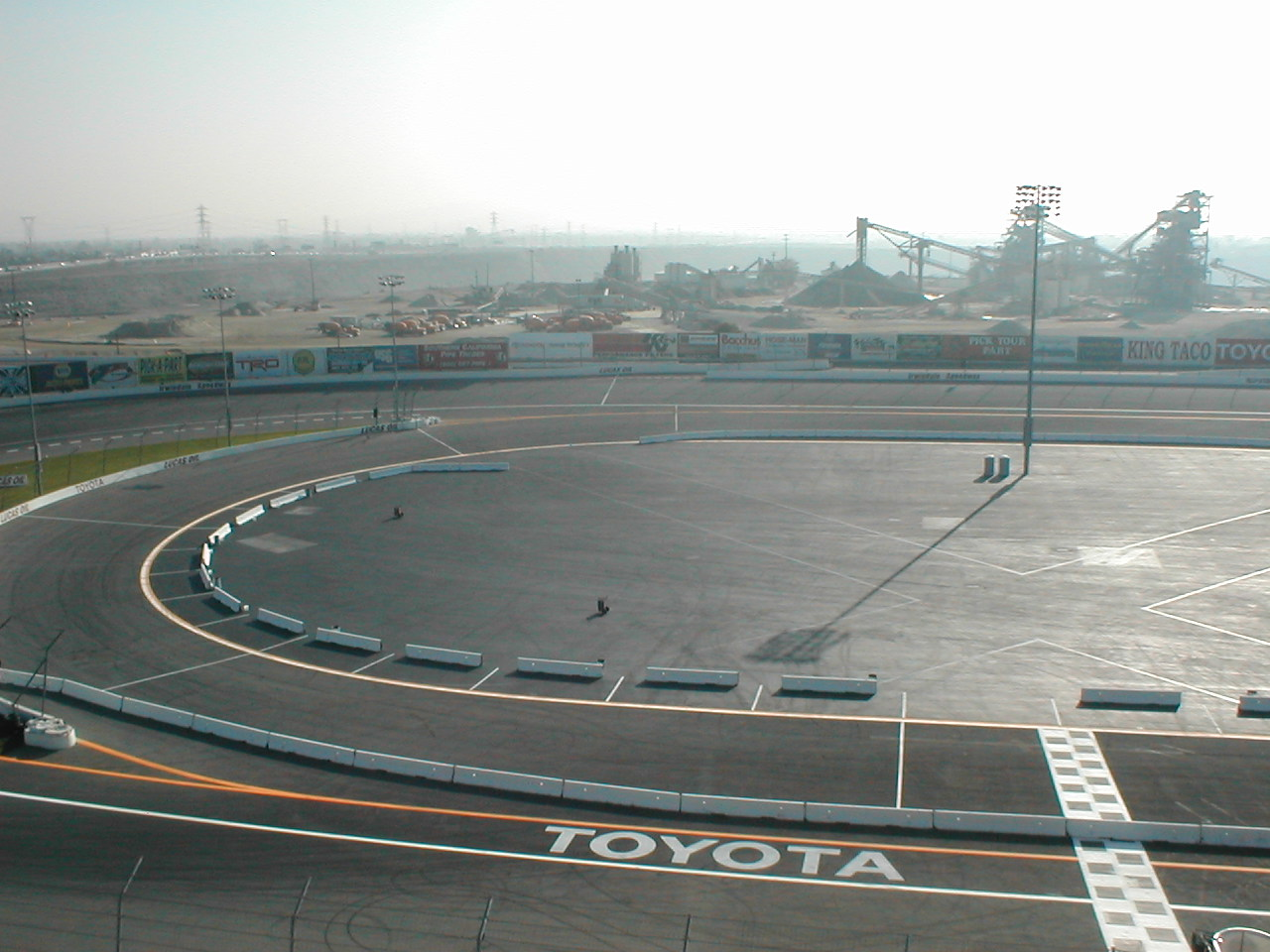
- Irwindale Speedway, 2006

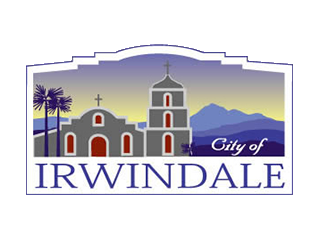
- Logo
- Nickname: Jardin de Roca
- Interactive map of Irwindale, California
- Coordinates: 34°7′N 117°58′W
- Country: United States
- State: California
- County: Los Angeles
- Founded: 1860
- Incorporated: August 6, 1957
- Chartered: 1986

Government
  - Type: Council–manager
  - Mayor: H. Manuel Ortiz
  - City Manager: Julian Miranda

Area
  - Total: 9.61 sq mi (24.88 km^{2})
  - Land: 8.82 sq mi (22.84 km^{2})
  - Water: 0.79 sq mi (2.04 km^{2}) 8.19%
- Elevation: 469 ft (143 m)

Population (2020)
  - Total: 1,472
  - Density: 166.9/sq mi (64.45/km^{2})
- Time zone: UTC-8 (Pacific)
  - Summer (DST): UTC-7 (PDT)
- ZIP codes: 91010, 91702, 91706
- Area code: 626
- FIPS code: 06-36826
- GNIS feature IDs: 1652728, 2410119
- Sister city: Salvatierra, Mexico
- Website: www.irwindaleca.gov

Irwindale is a city in the San Gabriel Valley, in Los Angeles County, California, United States. The population was 1,472 at the 2020 census and 1,422 at the 2010 census. The ZIP Codes serving the area are 91010, which is shared with Duarte, 91702, which is shared with Azusa, and 91706, which is shared with Baldwin Park.

Gravel pits in and near the city supplied most of the rock and sand to build the highways of nearby Los Angeles. Huy Fong sriracha, a popular hot sauce, is made in the city. Since 2005, the city has hosted the annual Renaissance Pleasure Faire of Southern California.

Most housing is in the southeastern portion of the city, near Arrow Highway and north of Cypress Street near Irwindale Avenue. There is also an isolated tract of housing on the southeastern corner of Meridian Street in the northwestern portion of the city.

== History ==
Irwindale was part of the Mexican land grants by Alta California Governor Juan Alvarado of Rancho La Puente, Rancho Azusa de Dalton, Rancho Azusa de Duarte, and Rancho San Francisquito. The families of Gregorio Fraijo and Facundo Ayon settled here in the 1850s. Significant economic growth did not arrive until the advent of the automobile, which drove up demand for the area's rocks and sand for the paving of roads. The city was incorporated on August 6, 1957.

Irwindale took advantage of urban redevelopment laws starting in 1976, and prospered in the following decade; it attracted a 200-acre (81 ha) Miller Brewing Company plant, the corporate headquarters of Home Savings of America, and other companies.

In the summer of 1987, city councilman Joe Breceda approached Al Davis, owner of the National Football League's Los Angeles Raiders, about building a new stadium on the site of one of the disused pits. Davis agreed to a $115 million deal. He would take ownership of the new stadium provided the Raiders would play there for 19 years. The deal included a $10 million nonrefundable signing bonus paid directly to Davis regardless of whether the plan would be executed. In the event, both parties were served multiple lawsuits, the U.S. Army Corps of Engineers demanded strict environmental impact assessments, and the Los Angeles County Board of Supervisors demurred, and the project was canceled. Davis pocketed the $10 million, and eventually moved the Raiders back to Oakland.

== Geography ==
According to the United States Census Bureau, the city has a total area of 9.6 square miles (25 km^{2}), of which 8.8 square miles (23 km^{2}) is land and 0.8 square miles (2.1 km^{2}) (8.19%) is water.

=== Groundwater contamination ===
Irwindale, along with many surrounding cities in the San Gabriel Valley, is identified as a Superfund site by the United States Environmental Protection Agency. Groundwater contamination was first found through well sampling in 1979. Contaminants include high levels of volatile organic compounds such as perchloroethylene (PCE) and trichloroethene (TCE), perchlorate, 1,4-dioxane, and N-nitrosodimethylamine (NDMA). More than 100 facilities are identified as contributors to this contamination in Irwindale, mainly through improper disposal and handling of chemicals over the years.

=== Climate ===
This region experiences warm (but not hot) and dry summers, with no average monthly temperatures above 71.6 °F. According to the Köppen Climate Classification system, Irwindale has a warm-summer Mediterranean climate, abbreviated "Csb" on climate maps.

== Demographics ==
Historical population
Census	Pop.	Note	%±
1960	1,518		—
1970	784		−48.4%
1980	1,030		31.4%
1990	1,050		1.9%
2000	1,446		37.7%
2010	1,422		−1.7%
2020	1,472		3.5%
U.S. Decennial Census; 1860–1870 1880-1890; 1900 1910 1920; 1930 1940 1950; 1960 1970 1980; 1990 2000 2010; 2020

Irwindale first appeared as a city in the 1960 U.S. census as part of the East San Gabriel Valley census county division.

=== Racial and ethnic composition ===
Irwindale city, California – Racial and ethnic composition Note: the US Census treats Hispanic/Latino as an ethnic category. This table excludes Latinos from the racial categories and assigns them to a separate category. Hispanics/Latinos may be of any race.
Race / Ethnicity (NH = Non-Hispanic)	Pop 1990	Pop 2000	Pop 2010	Pop 2020	% 1990	% 2000	% 2010	% 2020
White alone (NH)	126	129	87	53	12.00%	8.92%	6.12%	3.60%
Black or African American alone (NH)	1	5	5	15	0.10%	0.35%	0.35%	1.02%
Native American or Alaska Native alone (NH)	-	6	2	1	-	0.41%	0.14%	0.07%
Asian alone (NH)	22	15	28	50	2.10%	1.04%	1.97%	3.40%
Native Hawaiian or Pacific Islander alone (NH)	22	0	1	0	2.10%	0.00%	0.07%	0.00%
Other race alone (NH)	2	9	2	2	0.19%	0.62%	0.14%	0.14%
Mixed race or Multiracial (NH)	x	5	9	15	x	0.35%	0.63%	1.02%
Hispanic or Latino (any race)	899	1,277	1,288	1,336	85.62%	88.31%	90.58%	90.76%
Total	1,050	1,446	1,422	1,472	100.00%	100.00%	100.00%	100.00%

=== 2020 census ===
As of the 2020 census, Irwindale had a population of 1,472 and a population density of 166.8 inhabitants per square mile (64.4/km^{2}).

The census reported that 1,443 people (98.0% of the population) lived in households, 29 (2.0%) lived in non-institutionalized group quarters, and no one was institutionalized. There were 412 households, of which 191 (46.4%) had children under the age of 18 living in them. Of all households, 190 (46.1%) were married-couple households, 30 (7.3%) were cohabiting couple households, 122 (29.6%) had a female householder with no partner present, and 70 (17.0%) had a male householder with no partner present. 53 households (12.9%) were one person, and 25 (6.1%) were one person aged 65 or older. The average household size was 3.5, and there were 331 families (80.3% of all households).

The age distribution was 359 people (24.4%) under age 18, 147 people (10.0%) aged 18 to 24, 389 people (26.4%) aged 25 to 44, 380 people (25.8%) aged 45 to 64, and 197 people (13.4%) who were 65 years of age or older. The median age was 36.9 years. For every 100 females, there were 96.0 males, and for every 100 females age 18 and over there were 93.9 males.

There were 424 housing units, of which 412 (97.2%) were occupied and 2.8% were vacant, at an average density of 48.1 units per square mile (18.6 units/km^{2}). Of the occupied units, 277 (67.2%) were owner-occupied and 135 (32.8%) were occupied by renters. The homeowner vacancy rate was 0.0% and the rental vacancy rate was 0.0%.

100.0% of residents lived in urban areas, while 0.0% lived in rural areas.

=== Income and poverty ===
In 2023, the US Census Bureau estimated that the median household income was $113,250, and the per capita income was $38,924. About 4.7% of families and 6.3% of the population were below the poverty line.

=== 2010 census ===
The 2010 United States census reported that Irwindale had a population of 1,422. The population density was 147.9 inhabitants per square mile (57.1/km^{2}). The racial makeup of Irwindale was 833 (58.6%) White (6.1% Non-Hispanic White), 12 (0.8%) African American, 29 (2.0%) Native American, 34 (2.4%) Asian, 8 (0.6%) Pacific Islander, 448 (31.5%) from other races, and 58 (4.1%) from two or more races. Hispanic or Latino of any race were 1,288 persons (90.6%).

The Census reported that 1,372 people (96.5% of the population) lived in households, 50 (3.5%) lived in non-institutionalized group quarters, and 0 (0%) were institutionalized.

There were 374 households, out of which 194 (51.9%) had children under the age of 18 living in them, 189 (50.5%) were opposite-sex married couples living together, 88 (23.5%) had a female householder with no husband present, 32 (8.6%) had a male householder with no wife present. There were 32 (8.6%) unmarried opposite-sex partnerships, and 1 (0.3%) same-sex married couples or partnerships. 48 households (12.8%) were made up of individuals, and 22 (5.9%) had someone living alone who was 65 years of age or older. The average household size was 3.67. There were 309 families (82.6% of all households); the average family size was 3.93.

The population was spread out, with 373 people (26.2%) under the age of 18, 154 people (10.8%) aged 18 to 24, 397 people (27.9%) aged 25 to 44, 347 people (24.4%) aged 45 to 64, and 151 people (10.6%) who were 65 years of age or older. The median age was 34.0 years. For every 100 females, there were 93.5 males. For every 100 females age 18 and over, there were 90.0 males.

There were 390 housing units at an average density of 40.6 per square mile (15.7/km^{2}), of which 261 (69.8%) were owner-occupied, and 113 (30.2%) were occupied by renters. The homeowner vacancy rate was 0.8%; the rental vacancy rate was 2.6%. 992 people (69.8% of the population) lived in owner-occupied housing units and 380 people (26.7%) lived in rental housing units.

According to the 2010 United States census, Irwindale had a median household income of $63,250, with 10.4% of the population living below the federal poverty line.

=== 2000 census ===
Mapping L.A. reported that in 2000, Mexican (71.0%) and German (4.4%) were the most common ancestries. Mexico (60.0%) and Costa Rica (19.3%) were the most common foreign places of birth.

== Economy ==
With relatively few residents, Irwindale consists mostly of rock quarries, which are the major revenue source for the city. The Irwindale Event Center is also located in the city, as is the Santa Fe Dam Recreation Area near the San Gabriel River, a plant of the Miller Brewing Company, and a plant of the Huy Fong Foods sriracha sauce company.

=== Top employers ===
According to the city's 2014 Comprehensive Annual Financial Report, the top employers in the city are:

#	Employer	# of Employees
1	Southern California Edison	2,528
2	Ready Pac Foods	1,900
3	MillerCoors	530
4	Asplundh Tree Expert Company	400
5	Mariposa Horticultural Enterprise	382
6	R Ranch Markets	344
7	Biosense Webster	390
8	Charter Communications	331
9	Best Overnite Express	268
10	Superior Communications	243

Molson Coors has announced it will cease production at its Irwindale brewery by September 2020, cutting all 470 jobs.

=== Huy Fong sriracha factory ===
The city of Irwindale offered a low interest loan to Huy Fong Foods in 2010 to locate its sriracha factory in Irwindale. Huy Fong took the loan and contributed $250,000 a year to the city as part of the deal. Huy Fong built a $40-million factory planned to generate about $300 million a year in sales. Shortly after Huy Fong paid off the loan early and stopped contributing to the city, Huy Fong became involved in lawsuits brought by its neighbors and the city of Irwindale, who complain of the odors of jalapeño pepper and garlic generated by the plant. The city's suit led to a court order for the plant to cease most operations. After some changes, the lawsuits were dropped in 2018 and production returned to past levels.

=== Sand and gravel mining ===
Irwindale Chamber of Commerce views the sand and gravel mining industry as a significant part of the city's strength.

=== CleanTech Environmental Inc. ===
On March 25, 2015, advocacy groups and concerned residents stood outside city hall and protested the opening of a new hazardous waste site, owned by CleanTech Environmental Inc. The protesting groups were most concerned with the facility's placement adjacent to an ecological reserve and landmark, the Santa Fe Dam Recreational Area. Protesting groups included the California League of Conservation Voters, California Latino Environmental Advocacy Network, Communities for a Better Environment, and East Yard Communities.

In an interview, CleanTech owner Bob Brown affirms that the facility will not pose an environmental concern. The building of the facility was planned to prevent storm runoff, and all waste management occurs inside the facility, not outside. He also cites the fact that recycling oil reduces California's carbon footprint and allows the waste to be turned into other products.

CleanTech's corporate offices have resided in Irwindale for over 15 years, and the new facility is expected to recycle 1.5 million gallons of used oil a year.

== Government ==
Irwindale's City Council is composed of five members, elected at-large and to a four-year term. Elections were held in November of odd-numbered years until the 2015 election. Effective with the 2018 California General Election, it will be held on a Tuesday after the first Monday in November.

In the state legislature Irwindale is located in the:

- 22nd State Senate District, represented by Democrat Susan Rubio.
- 48th State Assembly District, represented by Democrat Blanca Rubio.

In the United States House of Representatives, Irwindale is in California's 31st congressional district, represented by Democrat Gil Cisneros.

== Infrastructure ==
Irwindale is a full-service city. Its public services include a library, a skate park, a teen center, a senior center, a gymnasium, and a swimming pool. The city also offers its residents a vision and prescription drug benefit program, providing access to generic medication at a $3 or $10 copay depending on age. The city states that the program is meant to mitigate impacts on residents from mining activities, but the California State Auditor has criticized the city for spending approximately $1 million annually on a relatively small number of resident prescriptions, and of failing to coordinate coverage with other insurers.

The Los Angeles County Department of Health Services operates the Monrovia Health Center in Monrovia, serving Irwindale.

Public transit in Irwindale is served by Foothill Transit. On the Los Angeles Metro Rail system, there is the Irwindale station on the Metro A Line.

Irwindale has its own police department, and contracts with the Los Angeles County Fire Department for their services.

== See also ==
- San Gabriel Mountains
- San Gabriel River
- San Gabriel Valley
