= Rancho Azusa de Duarte =

1841 Mexican land grant in California

Coordinates: 34.150°N 117.940°W

Rancho Azusa de Duarte was a 6,596-acre (26.69 km^{2}) Mexican land grant in present-day Los Angeles County, California, given in 1841 by Governor Juan Alvarado to Andres Duarte, a former Mexican corporal. Cities that have been established on the Rancho lands originally granted to Andres Duarte include Arcadia, portions of Monrovia, all of Bradbury, all of Duarte, portions of Irwindale, portions of Azusa and a portion of Baldwin Park.

== History ==
Andres Avelino Duarte (1805 - 1863) was born at the Mission San Juan Capistrano. At age 16 he followed his father's career and joined the Mexican army. He was assigned to Mission San Gabriel. He married Maria Gertrudes Florentina Valenzuela in about 1827.

In 1841, on retirement from military service after 20 years, he petitioned Governor Juan Alvarado for a grant of vacant land in the upper San Gabriel Valley. He was granted what he named Rancho Azusa de Duarte. The Rancho Azusa Duarte lay west across San Gabriel River from the Rancho Azusa de Dalton. The original name for Rancho Azusa Dalton was Rancho El Susa, and Rancho Azusa Duarte was often called Susita. As a condition of the land grant, Andres Duarte built an adobe for himself and his family and settled on the land. He and his wife Gertrudes and their son Felipe Santiago lived in a small adobe called “The Homestead”, located on what is now Tocino Drive.

After the Mexican-American War and the signing of the Treaty of Guadalupe Hidalgo, Duarte filed a claim with the Public Land Commission for the lands granted to him in 1841. Duarte began incurring legal expenses and other debts, which he defrayed by selling portions of the rancho. His first sale was a 225-acre (0.91 km^{2}) parcel at the southern end of the rancho to Michael Whistler. Whistler later sold the entire parcel to Dr. Nehemiah Beardslee, who started the first school in Duarte and laid out the first section of Duarte's water lines. Andres Duarte divided much of the remainder of the rancho into 40-acre (160,000 m^{2}) lots and sold them individually.

A US patent for the rancho was awarded to Andres Duarte in 1878. Duarte finally won a favorable ruling from the Supreme Court for his land grant case in 1878, but by then he had sold the entire Rancho.

== See also ==
- List of California Ranchos
- Ranchos of Los Angeles County, California
- List of rancho land grants in Los Angeles County, California
