= Rancho San Francisquito (Dalton) =

Coordinates: 34.100°N 118.040°W

- Land grant of Mexico
- 1845–1873
- Area
  - Coordinates
  - Type: Mexican land grant
- History
  - Established: 1845
  - Disestablished: 1873
- Today part of: United States

Rancho San Francisquito was a 8,894-acre (35.99 km^{2}) Mexican land grant in present day Los Angeles County, California given in 1845 by Governor Pio Pico to Henry Dalton. The grant included present day cities of El Monte, Irwindale, and Temple City.

== History ==
Henry Dalton (1803-1884), was born in England, and in 1820 sailed to Lima, Peru and became a merchant; eventually commanding a small fleet of merchant vessels. By 1841 he had become a prominent figure in California coastal trade. Dalton was granted the two square league Rancho San Francisquito in 1845. Dalton's holdings also included Rancho Azusa de Dalton purchased in 1844, and Rancho Santa Anita purchased in 1847. At one time, Dalton owned an unbroken expanse of land from the present day San Dimas to the eastern edge of Pasadena.

With the cession of California to the United States following the Mexican-American War, the 1848 Treaty of Guadalupe Hidalgo provided that the land grants would be honored. As required by the Land Act of 1851, a claim for Rancho San Francisquito was filed with the Public Land Commission in 1852, confirmed by the Commission in 1853, but rejected by the US District Court in 1855, on the grounds that Henry Dalton was not, at the time of the grant, a citizen of Mexico. The decree was reversed by the US Supreme Court, and the grant was patented to Henry Dalton in 1867.

Between 1867 and 1873, Dalton sold parts of Rancho San Francisquito in small tracts. In 1873, Dalton sold the westerly two-thirds portion of the Rancho San Francisquito, 5,929-acre (23.99 km^{2}), to the Wolfskills who sold it to Elias Jackson (“Lucky”) Baldwin.

== See also ==
- List of Ranchos of California
- Ranchos of Los Angeles County, California
- Ranchos of California
