= Rancho Azusa de Dalton =

Mexican land grant in California

Coordinates: 34.150°N 117.890°W

Rancho Azusa de Dalton, (originally the Rancho El Susa), was a 4,431-acre (17.93 km^{2}) Mexican land grant in present-day Los Angeles County, California, given in 1841 by Governor Juan Alvarado to Luis Arenas. Arenas sold his Rancho Azusa de Duarte holdings three years later to Henry Dalton (1803–1884), a wealthy merchant from Pueblo of Los Angeles. Dalton named his holding Rancho Azusa de Dalton. Henry Dalton was also called Don Enrique Dalton.

Cities that have been established on the Rancho lands originally granted to Henry Dalton include Azusa, Arcadia, Monrovia, Irwindale and Baldwin Park.

== History ==
Luis Arenas received the Rancho El Susa land grant from Governor (pro-tem) Manuel Jimeno in 1841. In 1844 Henry Dalton purchased El Susa from Arenas, and also Arenas one third interest in Rancho San Jose.

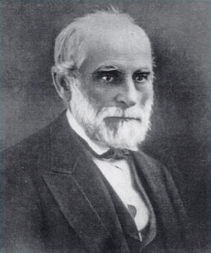
Henry Dalton

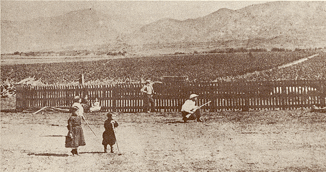
Rancho Azusa de Dalton 1860s, with Henry Dalton, Winall Dalton, Anna Ellen Dalton, Soyla Dalton and Valentine Dalton.

Henry Dalton was born in England, and in 1820 sailed to Lima, Peru, and became a merchant eventually commanding a small fleet of merchant vessels. By 1841 he had become a prominent figure in California coastal trade. Dalton chose Rancho El Susa as his home renaming it Azusa de Dalton. Dalton built a house here on a place known as Dalton Hill, near 6th Street and Cerritos Avenue in Azusa. The Rancho Azusa Dalton lay east across the San Gabriel River from the Rancho Azusa de Duarte. The first was often called El Susa, and the latter Susita. Dalton further increased his holdings to include the Rancho San Francisquito and Rancho Santa Anita. In the end Dalton owned an unbroken expanse of land from the present day San Dimas to the eastern edge of Pasadena.

With the cession of California to the United States following the Mexican-American War, the 1848 Treaty of Guadalupe Hidalgo provided that the land grants would be honored. After filing his claim for Rancho Azusa de Dalton with the Public Land Commission, as required by the Land Act of 1851, Dalton disagreed with the 1860 US survey by Henry Hancock, and borrowed money from J. S. Slauson to fight the case through the courts. The courts decided against him after 24 years of litigation. Consequently, in 1885, Dalton turned Rancho Azusa over to Slauson, who deeded a 55-acre (220,000 m^{2}) homestead to Dalton. Henry Dalton received a US patent for Rancho Azusa in 1876. When he died in 1884, Dalton had lost most of his property and was living in poverty.

In 1885 Slauson acquired Henry Dalton's Rancho Azusa de Dalton, organized the Azusa Land and Water Company, and developed the town of Azusa. Rancho Azusa, with the exception of some 500 acres (2.0 km^{2}), was sold to John Dustin Bicknell, I. W. Hellman and others. The lots in the town of Azusa were put on the market in 1887, and the following year the Santa Fe Railroad was completed. On December 29, 1898, Azusa was incorporated as a city of the sixth class.

Henry Dalton was born in London on October 8, 1804 to Winnall Thomas Dalton and Ann Woolfe. He had 9 brothers & sisters.

== See also ==
- List of California Ranchos
- Ranchos of Los Angeles County, California
- Savannah Memorial Park on Rancho Azusa de Dalton
- List of rancho land grants in Los Angeles County, California
