= Santa Fe Dam Recreation Area =

County park in Irwindale, California, U.S.

Coordinates: 34.11089°N 117.95054°W

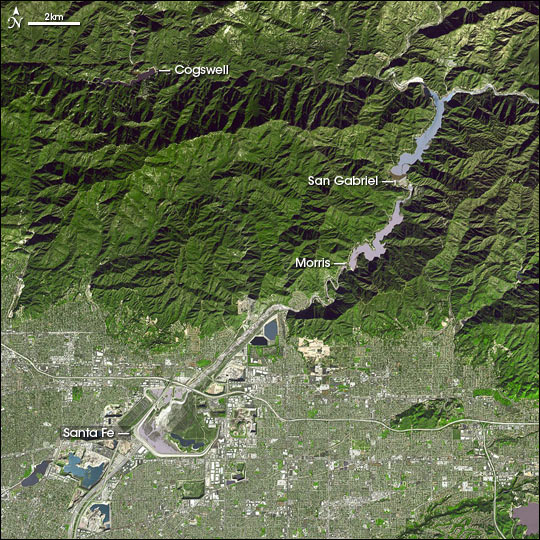
False-color satellite image of the San Gabriel River and the Santa Fe Dam.

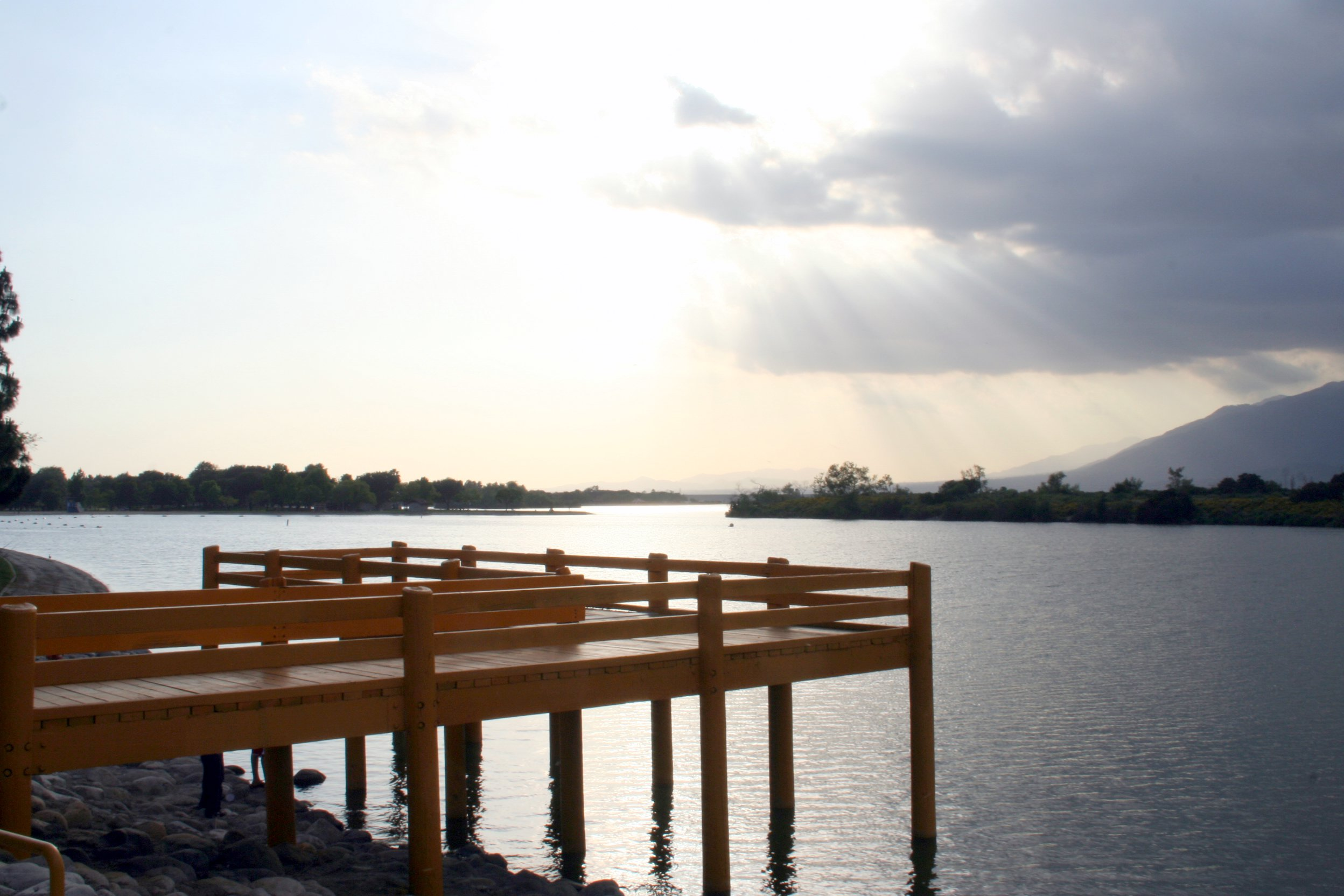
The yellow dock by the Santa Fe Dam

The Santa Fe Dam Recreation Area is a county park located in Irwindale, California, US, in the San Gabriel Valley, inside the Santa Fe Dam. The park and dam are nestled among gravel quarries in the area, many of which are currently inactive. The dam is a flood-control dam on the San Gabriel River. The dam functions as a dry dam most of the time. The San Gabriels produce more gravel than most other mountains. The park is maintained and operated by the Los Angeles County Department of Parks and Recreation. The park, located off the San Gabriel River Freeway (Interstate 605), contains a 70-acre (280,000 m^{2}) lake for year-round fishing and non motorized watercraft.

The dam is a popular tourist attraction, most likely due to the views of the San Gabriel Mountains. Recreational activities at the park include seasonal swimming, fishing, non-motorized boating, cycling, birdwatching, and hiking. In 2005, the annual Renaissance Pleasure Faire of Southern California was relocated to the park from its long-established location at the Glen Helen Regional Park in Devore, California. The San Gabriel River Bike Trail runs through the recreation area. The bike path traces the rim of the dam around to the east of the flood basin and park, with access at Azusa Canyon Drive (main entrance to park)

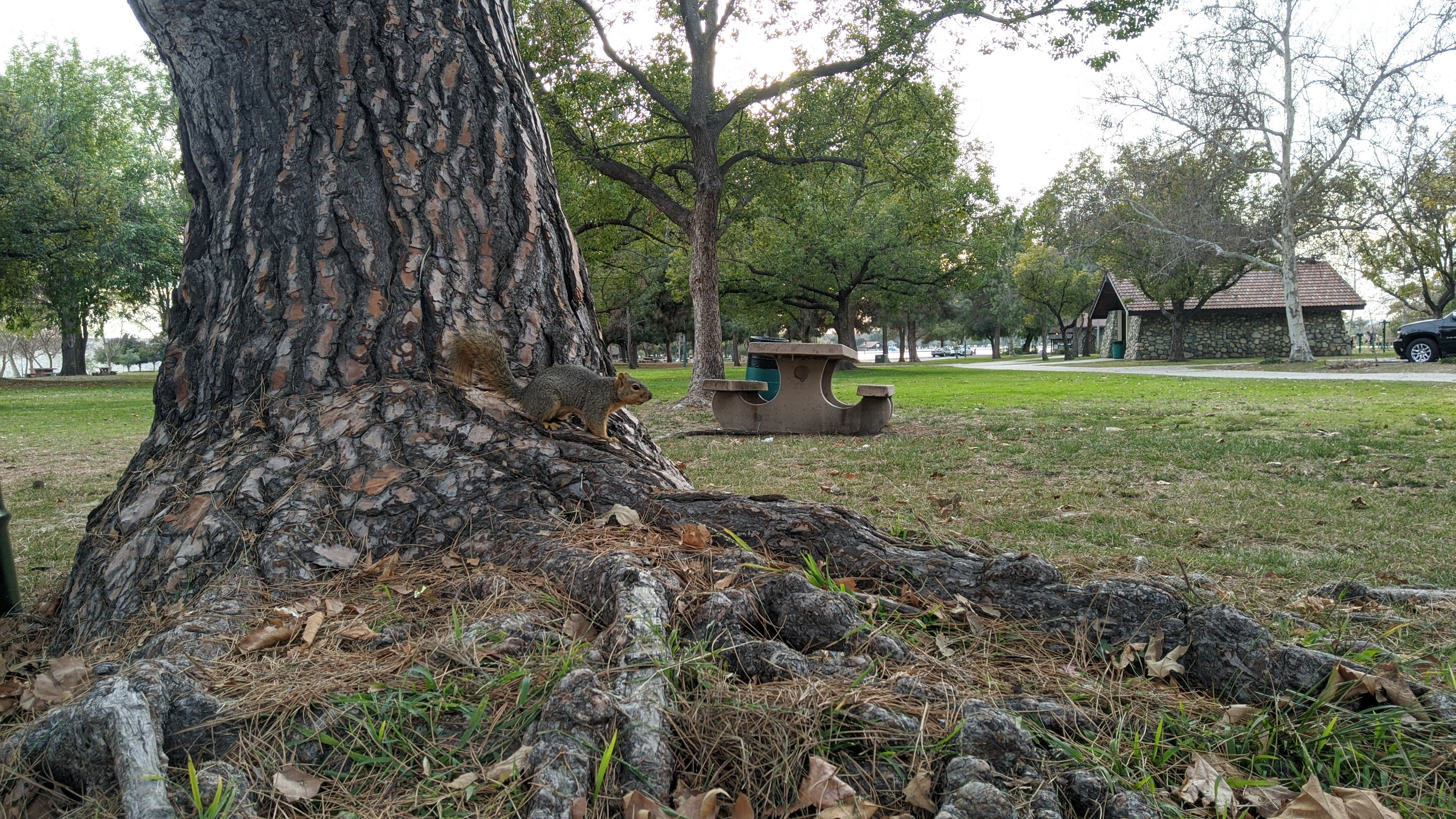
One of many squirrels standing on tree near restroom area

Fish found in the lake include largemouth bass, bluegills, crappie, and carp. Rainbow trout are stocked in the cooler months, and channel catfish are stocked in the summer months. Some of the rare plants and wildlife found in the river fan include the alluvial fan sage scrub, cactus wrens, California gnatcatchers, scissor-tail flycatchers, horned lizards, and kangaroo rats.

Due to the Los Angeles County's budget cuts, the dam became one of six regional parks closed on Mondays and Tuesdays, starting from June 30, 2025.

== Santa Fe Dam Nature Center ==
The focus of the Santa Fe Dam Nature Center is the plant life and wildlife of the alluvial fan of the San Gabriel River. The nature center is open Saturdays from 10 AM to 1 PM, and is operated by the San Gabriel Mountains Regional Conservancy. Programs include nature and bird walks, nature hobby presentations, insect identification, Tongva cultural history and other special programs.
