= Siriraj =

Siriraj, a neighbourhood in Bangkok, Thailand may refer to:

- Siriraj Hospital
- Faculty of Medicine Siriraj Hospital, Mahidol University
- Siri Rat Subdistrict of Bangkok Noi District, the neighbourhood with Wang Lang market and Siriraj Hospital
- Wang Lang (Siri Rat) Pier of the Chao Phraya Express Boat Service

== See also ==
- Si Racha (disambiguation)
