= Huy Fong sriracha =

American brand of sriracha chili sauce

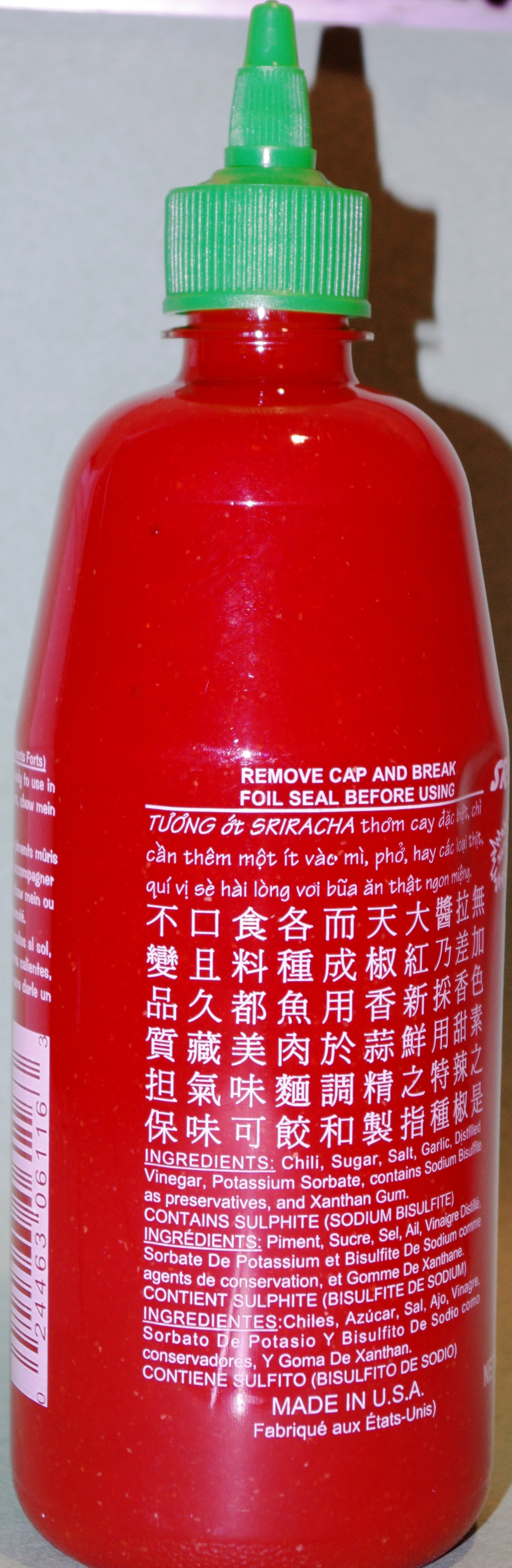

- Heat: Medium
- Scoville scale: 2,200; 2,500 SHU

Huy Fong sriracha

Chinese name
- Traditional Chinese: 是拉差香甜辣椒醬
- Simplified Chinese: 是拉差香甜辣椒酱
Transcriptions
Standard Mandarin
- Hanyu Pinyin: Shìlāchà xiāngtián làjiāo jiàng
Yue: Cantonese
- Yale Romanization: Sih làai chà hèung tìhm laaht jìu jeung
- Jyutping: Si^{6} laai^{1} caa^{1} hoeng^{1} tim^{4} laat^{6} ziu^{1} zoeng^{3}

Vietnamese name
- Vietnamese alphabet: Tương Ớt Sriracha
- Literal meaning: Sriracha chili sauce

Huy Fong's sriracha sauce (/sɪˈrɑːtʃə/ sih-RAH-chə; Thai: ศรีราชา, pronounced [sǐːrāːtɕʰāː]; Vietnamese: Tương Ớt Sriracha), also called cock sauce or rooster sauce due to the rooster on its label, is a brand of sriracha, a chili sauce that originated in Si Racha, Thailand. The sauce is produced by Huy Fong Foods, a California manufacturer, and was created in 1980 by David Tran, a Vietnamese immigrant to the US from Vietnam.

Some cookbooks include recipes using this of brand sauce as their main condiment. Huy Fong sriracha can be recognized by its bright red color and its packaging: a clear plastic bottle with a green cap, text in Vietnamese, English, Chinese (in traditional top-to-bottom, right-to-left script), and Spanish, and the rooster logo. The logo refers to the Year of the Rooster in the Vietnamese zodiac, as David Tran was born in 1945. The green cap and rooster logo are trademarked, but the U.S. Patent and Trademark Office considers "sriracha" a generic term.

== History ==
David Tran began making chili sauces in 1975 in his native Vietnam, where his brother grew chili peppers on a farm north of Saigon. In 1978, the new Communist Vietnamese government began to persecute ethnic Chinese in south Vietnam. Tran and three thousand other refugees crowded onto the Taiwanese freighter Huey Fong, heading for Hong Kong. After a month-long standoff with British authorities, its passengers disembarked on January 19, 1979. Tran was granted asylum in the United States. He started Huy Fong Foods in 1980, naming the company after the refugee ship that brought him out of Vietnam.

The sauce was initially supplied to Asian restaurants near his base in Chinatown, Los Angeles, but sales grew steadily by word of mouth and it soon became available at Asian grocery stores in other parts of the United States. In December 2009, Bon Appétit magazine named the sauce Ingredient of the Year for 2010. In 2012, over 20 million bottles were sold. Huy Fong Foods says demand has outpaced supply since the company started making the sauce. The company does not advertise because advertising would widen that gap.

Sriracha sauce has grown from a cult taste to one of the food industry's most popular condiments. It has been used in burgers, sushi, snacks, candy, beverages, and even health products. Tran said he was dissuaded from securing a trademark on the word sriracha since it is difficult to obtain one named after a real-life location. This has allowed others to develop their own versions, using the name. In 2016, Lexus partnered with Huy Fong Foods to build a single promotional Sriracha IS sport sedan.

=== Nuisance lawsuit ===
In October 2013, the city of Irwindale filed a lawsuit against the Huy Fong Foods factory after approximately 30 residents of the town complained of the spicy smells the factory was emitting while producing sriracha sauce. The plaintiff initially sought an injunction enjoining Huy Fong from "operating or using" the plant. On November 27, 2013, Judge Robert H. O'Brien ruled partially in favor of the city, declaring Huy Fong Foods must cease any operations that could be causing the noxious odors and make changes to mitigate them, though he did not order that operations cease completely. According to the judge, although there was a "lack of credible evidence" linking locals' complaints of breathing trouble and watering eyes to the factory, the odor that could be "reasonably inferred to be emanating from the facility" is, for residents, "extremely annoying, irritating and offensive to the senses warranting consideration as a public nuisance." In late January 2014, the city of Irwindale announced it was expanding its case against Huy Fong Foods to include a claim of breach of contract, alleging that the plant violated a condition of its operating permit by emitting harmful odors. The case was scheduled for jury trial in Los Angeles County Superior Court on November 3, 2014.

During the legal battles, Tran has openly expressed his interest in moving the factory to another state, after the Irwindale City Council voted to declare the Sriracha factory a public nuisance. A delegation led by Texas state representative Jason Villalba toured the Irwindale factory and offered incentives to move operations to Denton. Tran later decided to keep the factory in southern California, and on May 29, 2014, it was announced that Irwindale had dropped the lawsuit against Huy Fong Foods.

=== Pepper supply ===
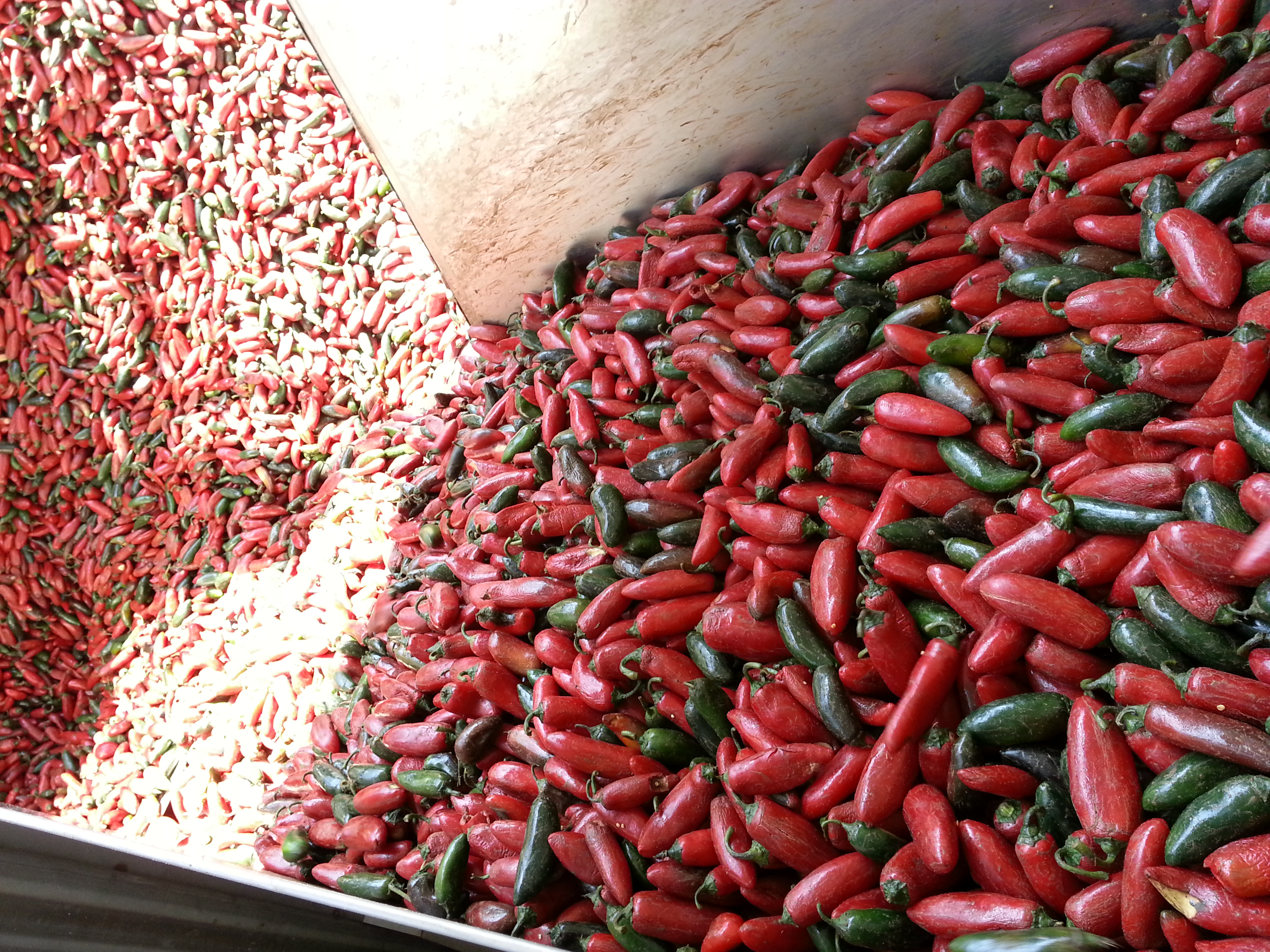
Chili peppers on the production line at Huy Fong Foods

In 1988, Underwood Ranches became the company's primary supplier of jalapeños. In 2016, Huy Fong overpaid Underwood by $1.46 million for prepayment of estimated costs. According to Underwood's lawyer, Tran attempted just before this to hire away Underwood's COO in order to form a new chili-growing concern, breaking the trust between Tran and Underwood. Huy Fong sued Underwood for not paying back this overpayment; Underwood countersued for breach of contract and committing fraud by intentionally misrepresenting and concealing information. In July 2019, the case was decided generally in favor of Underwood, with a California jury awarding the grower $10 million in punitive damages and $14.8 million to make up for lost contract revenue between 2016 and 2019. However, the jury also decided that Huy Fong's claim of overpayment was valid, so $1.46 million was deducted from the damages.

In June 2022, Huy Fong Foods temporarily halted the production of the chili sauce. This decision was prompted by a severe shortage of chili peppers caused by a drought in Mexico that affected the quality of the peppers. While production soon resumed in the fall, the company soon declared another "unprecedented inventory shortage" in April 2023, offering no estimate as to when this shortage might be resolved. An August 2023 CNBC special program claims that the shortage was caused by Huy Fong switching pepper suppliers, as Underwood still has production capacity (land, irrigation, processing) for the needed peppers. In April 2024, the company told customers it had halted production of all its products until September as its chili harvest was too green.

== Composition ==
Sriracha sauce
Nutritional value per 5g
- Energy: 0 kJ (0 kcal)
- Carbohydrates: 0g
- Sugars: 0g
- Dietary fibre: 0g
- Fat: 0g
- Saturated: 0g
- Trans: 0g
- Protein: 0g
Vitamins and minerals
Minerals	Quantity %DV^{†}
Calcium	0% 1 mg
Iron	0% 0 mg
Potassium	1% 16 mg
Sodium	3% 70 mg

The basic ingredients of red chilies, garlic, and vinegar have not changed since the early days of the product. Today, the bottle lists the ingredients as: "chili, sugar, salt, garlic, distilled vinegar, potassium sorbate, sodium bisulfite and xanthan gum". Huy Fong Foods' chili sauces are made from fresh, red, jalapeño chili peppers and contain no added water or artificial colors. Garlic powder is used rather than fresh garlic. The company formerly used serrano peppers, but found them difficult to harvest. To keep the sauce hot, the company produces only up to a monthly pre-sold quota in order to use only peppers from known sources. The sauce is certified as kosher by the Rabbinical Council of California.

== Production ==
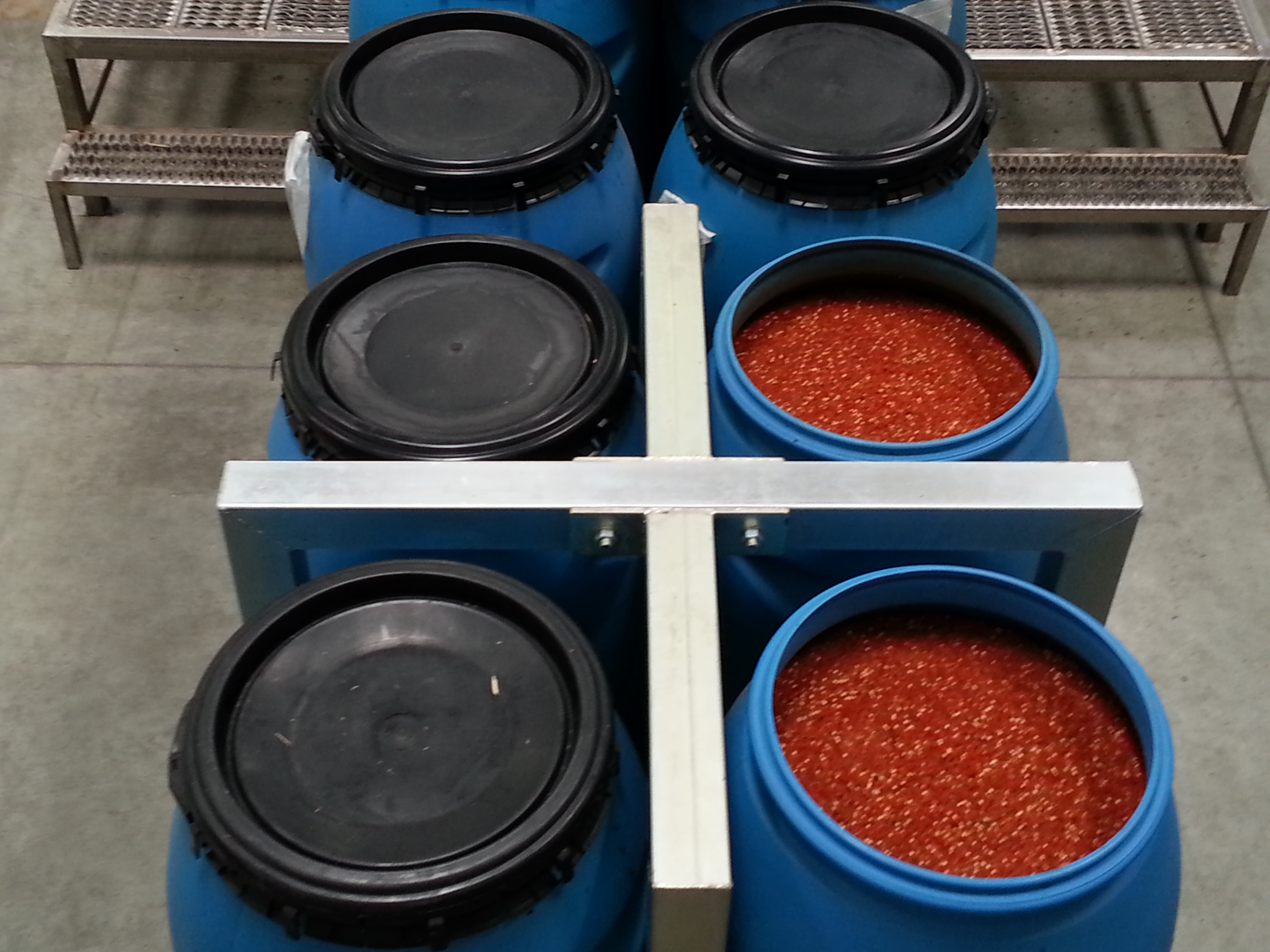
Drums of sriracha sauce

The production of sriracha sauce begins with growing the chilis. The chilis were grown on Underwood Ranch until the two companies ended their relationship in 2016. David Tran, owner of Huy Fong Foods, contracted about 690 hectares (1,700 acres) of farmland that spreads from Ventura County to Kern County in California. The chili peppers are planted in March.

Tran uses a particular type of machinery that reduces waste by mixing rocks, twigs and unwanted/unusable chilis, back into the soil. The chilis are harvested in mid-July to October, and are driven from the farm to the Huy Fong Foods processing facility in Irwindale.

Because Tran does not add food coloring to the sauce, each bottle varies in color. At the beginning of the harvest season, the chilis are greener and therefore the sauce yields a more muted-red color. Later in the season, the sauce produced is bright red. After the chilis are harvested, they are washed, crushed, and mixed with sugar, salt, garlic, distilled vinegar, potassium sorbate, sodium bisulfite as preservatives and xanthan gum. The sauce is loaded into drums and then distributed into bottles. All drums and bottles are manufactured on-site, to reduce waste and emissions.

== Legacy ==
Filmmaker Griffin Hammond produced a 33-minute documentary titled Sriracha about the Huy Fong Foods sauce. It was funded with the help of a Kickstarter campaign which raised $21,009; over four times the goal. The film was released online on December 11, 2013, in advance of submission to film festivals.

== See also ==
- List of hot sauces
