= Indy Mogul =

- The Indy Mogul logo.
- Genre: Interview, review, DIY, filmmaking
- Created by: Erik Beck; Justin Johnson
- Developed by: Next New Networks; Younger Productions
- Starring: Ted Sim; Dave Maze
- Country of origin: United States
- Original language: English

Production
- Running time: Approx. 4–20 mins per episode

Original release
- Network: YouTube
- Release: April 16, 2007 – February 1, 2021

Indy Mogul was an Internet-based video webcast geared towards independent filmmakers and creatives. Indy Mogul is hosted on YouTube by Ted Sim and Dave Maze.

== Awards ==
Indy Mogul's The Best Short Films in the World received the 2009 People's Voice Award for the Build your own and DIY by the Webby's in the category of "Variety Show".

The Reel Good Show won Best Variety show at the 2010 Webby Awards.

== Relations with the media ==
Indy Mogul has been mentioned on notable online news sites including CNN, MediaWeek, The Wall Street Journal, featured on G4 and has also won multiple webby awards.

== Current and Former Hosts ==
Name	Role
Ted Sim	Former Host
Erik Beck	Creator of Indy Mogul, Former Host of BFX, Eric Builds the Movies, and Q & Erik
Justin Johnson	Co-Creator of Indy Mogul, Former Host of Film Fights TV
Griffin Hammond	Former Host of "Indy News"
Russell Hasenauer	Former Presenter and Host of "Friday 101," The Live Q&A, and "Moguler Made"
Zack Finfrock	Former Host of BFX
Steve Nelson	Former Host of Weekend Extra & 4 Minute Film School
Bobby Miller	Former Host for the Reel Good Show and The Best Short Films in the World
Jake Strunk	Former Host and Producer of Film Fights TV, Creator/Animator of Sunday Preview.
Grace Randolph	Former Host and Creator of Beyond the Trailer & Movie Math

== See also ==
- Independent films
- Special effects
- Internet forum
