= Rabbinical Council of California =

- Location: California
- Key people: Rabbi Meyer H. May (president); Rabbi Amram Gabay (vice president); Rabbi Sholom Tendler (vice president)
- Website: Rabbinical Council of California

The Rabbinical Council of California is the primary representative body of Orthodox Judaism in California. Its three primary areas of operation are overseeing Kashrut certification in the state, maintaining a Beit Din and community liaison.

The current president is Rabbi Meyer H. May, the VPs are Rabbi Amram Gabay and Rabbi Sholom Tendler.
