= Sriracha =

Thai hot sauce

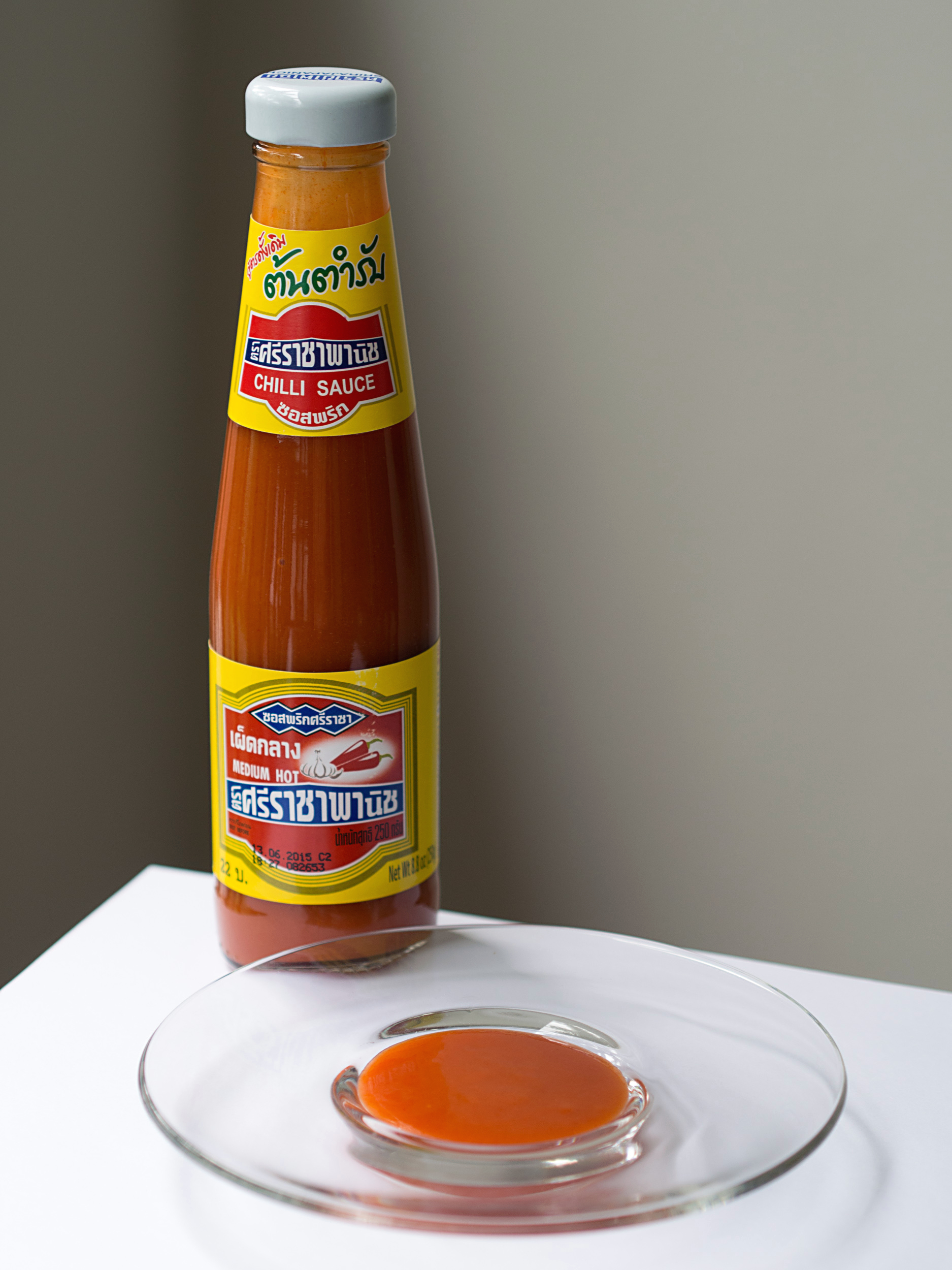
- Sriraja Panich chili sauce by Thai Theparos Food Products
- Type: Condiment
- Place of origin: Si Racha, Thailand
- Region or state: Southeast Asia
- Associated cuisine: Thai and Vietnamese
- Main ingredients: Chilli pepper

Sriracha (/siːˈrɑːtʃə/ see-RAH-chə or /sɪˈrɑːtʃə/ si-RAH-chə; Thai: ศรีราชา, pronounced [sǐːrāːtɕʰāː]) is a type of hot sauce or chili sauce made from a paste of chili peppers, distilled vinegar, pickled garlic, sugar, and salt. It was first produced in 1932 by a native of Si Racha, Thailand, though it may have been based on older Cantonese recipes.

== Use ==
In Thailand, sriracha is frequently used as a dipping sauce, particularly for seafood and omelets.

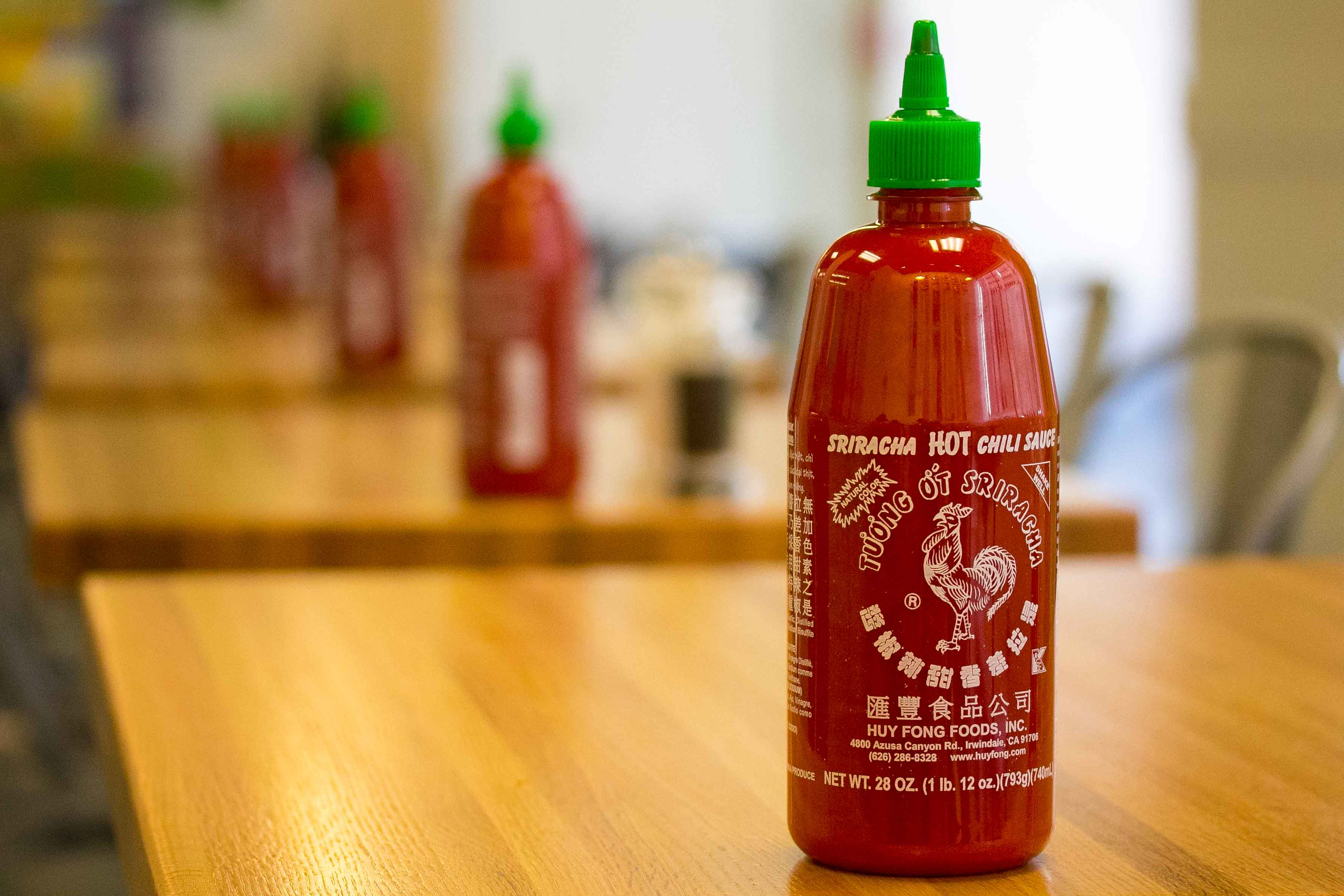
Tương Ớt Sriracha ("Rooster Sauce") by Huy Fong Foods.

In Vietnamese cuisine, particularly in North America, sriracha appears as a condiment for phở and fried noodles, as a topping for spring rolls (chả giò), and in sauces. In Vietnam however, sriracha is not found in many restaurants or private homes, and a different type of chili sauce – tương ớt – is used far more often.

Sriracha is also eaten in soup, on eggs and burgers. Jams, lollipops, and cocktails have all been made using the sauce, and sriracha-flavored potato chips have been marketed.

== Origin ==
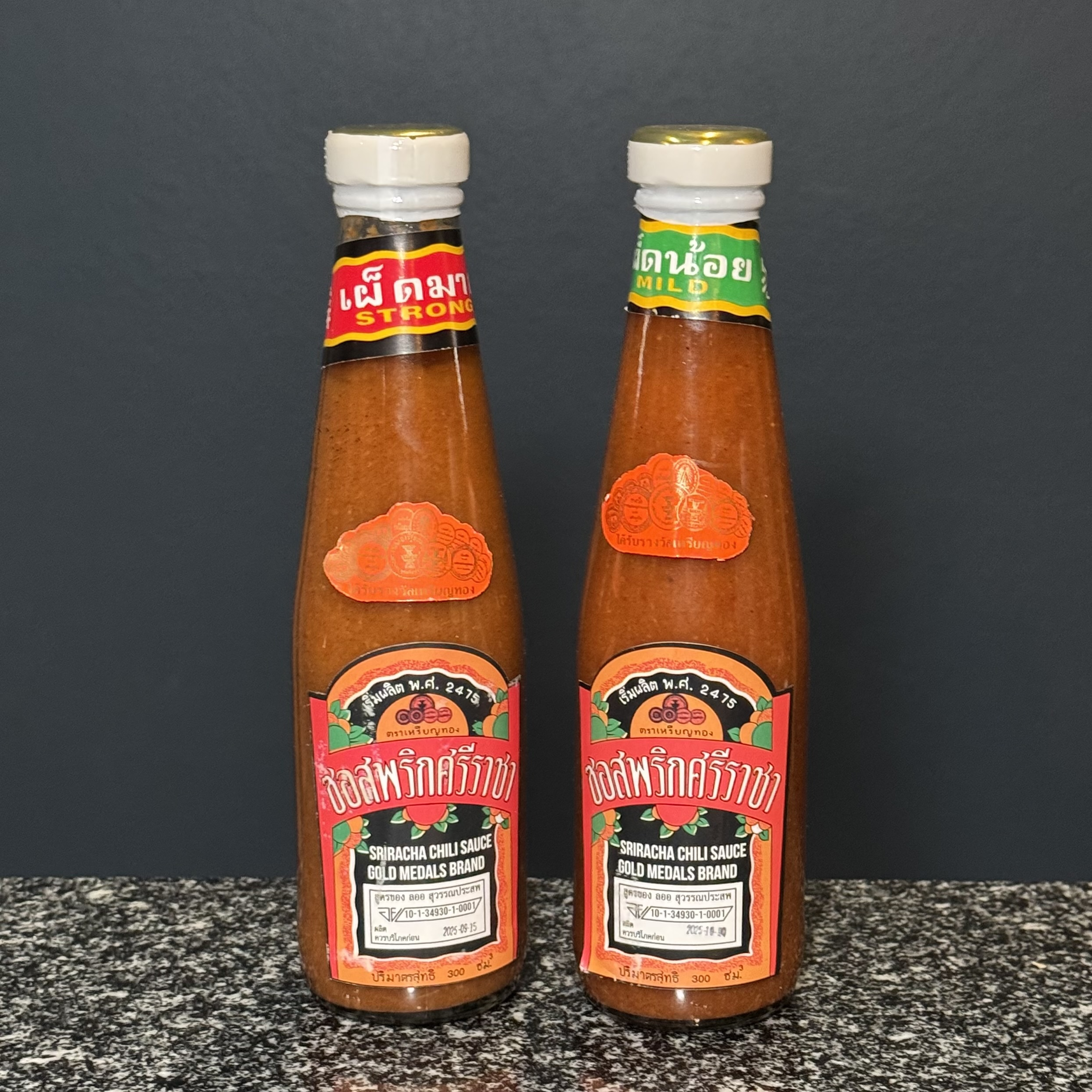
Gold Medals was the first commercially produced sriracha sauce, beginning in 1932.

Commercial production of sriracha chili sauce began in 1932, the same year that the Siamese Revolution was changing Thailand into a constitutional monarchy. That year, La-Orr Suwanprasop, a native of Si Racha who had settled in Bangkok, began producing and selling her own chili sauce. Her product won a gold medal in a competition during the Constitution Celebration. She attempted to register the brand "Sriracha Chili Sauce" after her hometown, but the name of a district was not a permissible brand name on its own; "Gold Medals" was used instead. The sauce is still available, and has kept its original label design.

The first internationally-renowned Sriracha chili sauce is the "Sriraja Panich" brand, which began sales in 1935. It was created by Thanom Chakkapak, another native of Si Racha, who established a chili sauce factory in Si Racha, Chonburi Province. Her sauce became a well-known local product. In 1984, Thai Theparos Company acquired the business and its recipe, and expanded distribution both domestically and internationally. The brand remains widely recognized around the world.

Sriracha sauce may be an adaptation of a Cantonese garlic and chili sauce originally from Shunde, China. In the early 1900s, Cantonese immigrants settled in Si Racha, and their garlic and chili sauce was sold in Thailand for decades before the first bottles of Gold Medals and Sriraja Panich were produced.

== Variations ==
=== Thailand ===
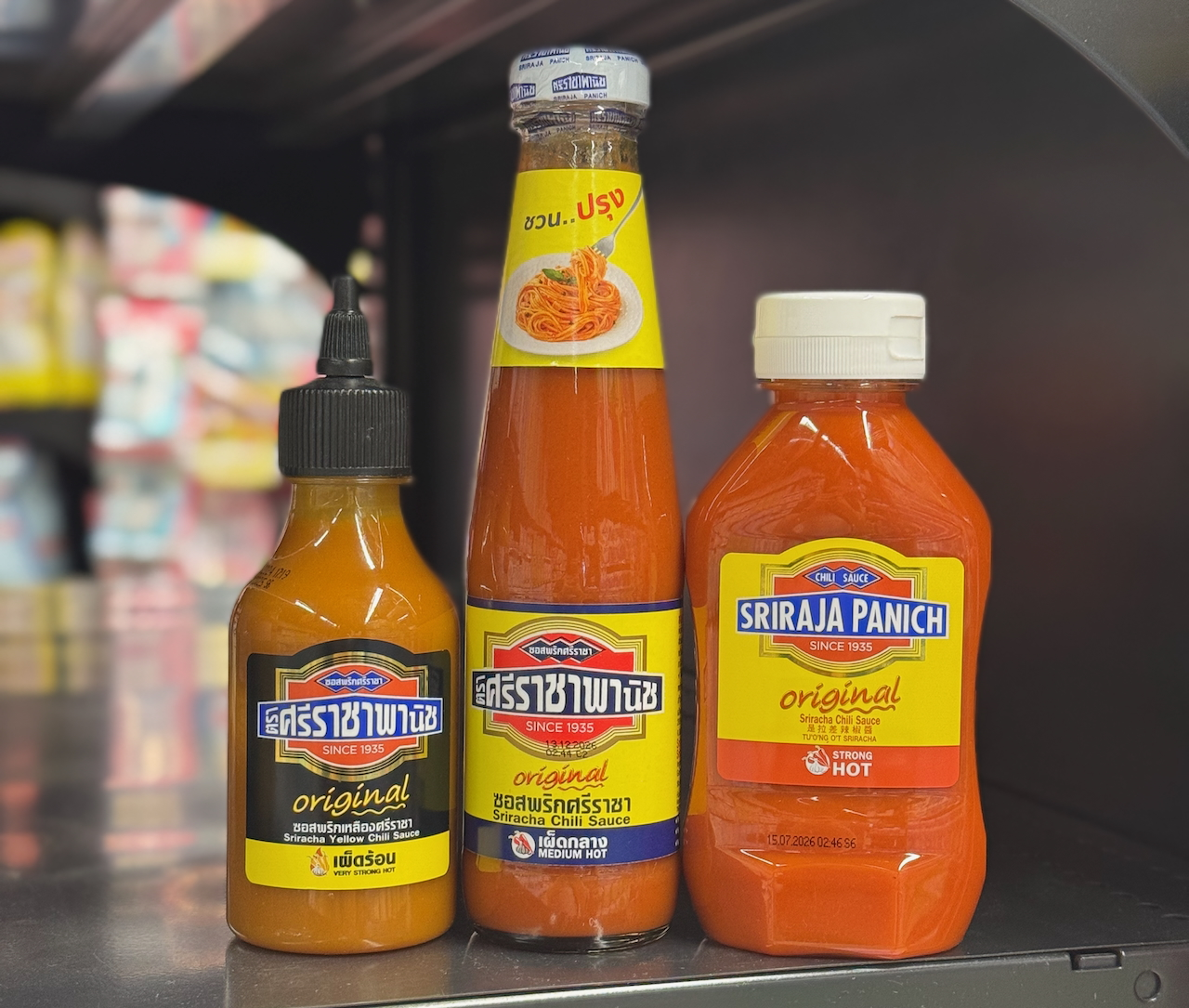
Sriraja Panich chili sauces

In Thailand, the sauce is most often called sot Siracha (Thai: ซอสศรีราชา) and sometimes nam phrik Siracha (Thai: น้ำพริกศรีราชา). Traditional Thai sriracha sauce tends to be tangier in taste and runnier in texture than non-Thai versions.

In a 2013 Bon Appétit magazine interview, US Asian-foods distributor Eastland Food Corporation asserted that the Thai brand of hot sauce Sriraja Panich, which Eastland distributes, is the original "sriracha sauce" and was created in Si Racha, Thailand, in the 1930s from the recipe of a housewife named Thanom Chakkapak.

=== United States ===
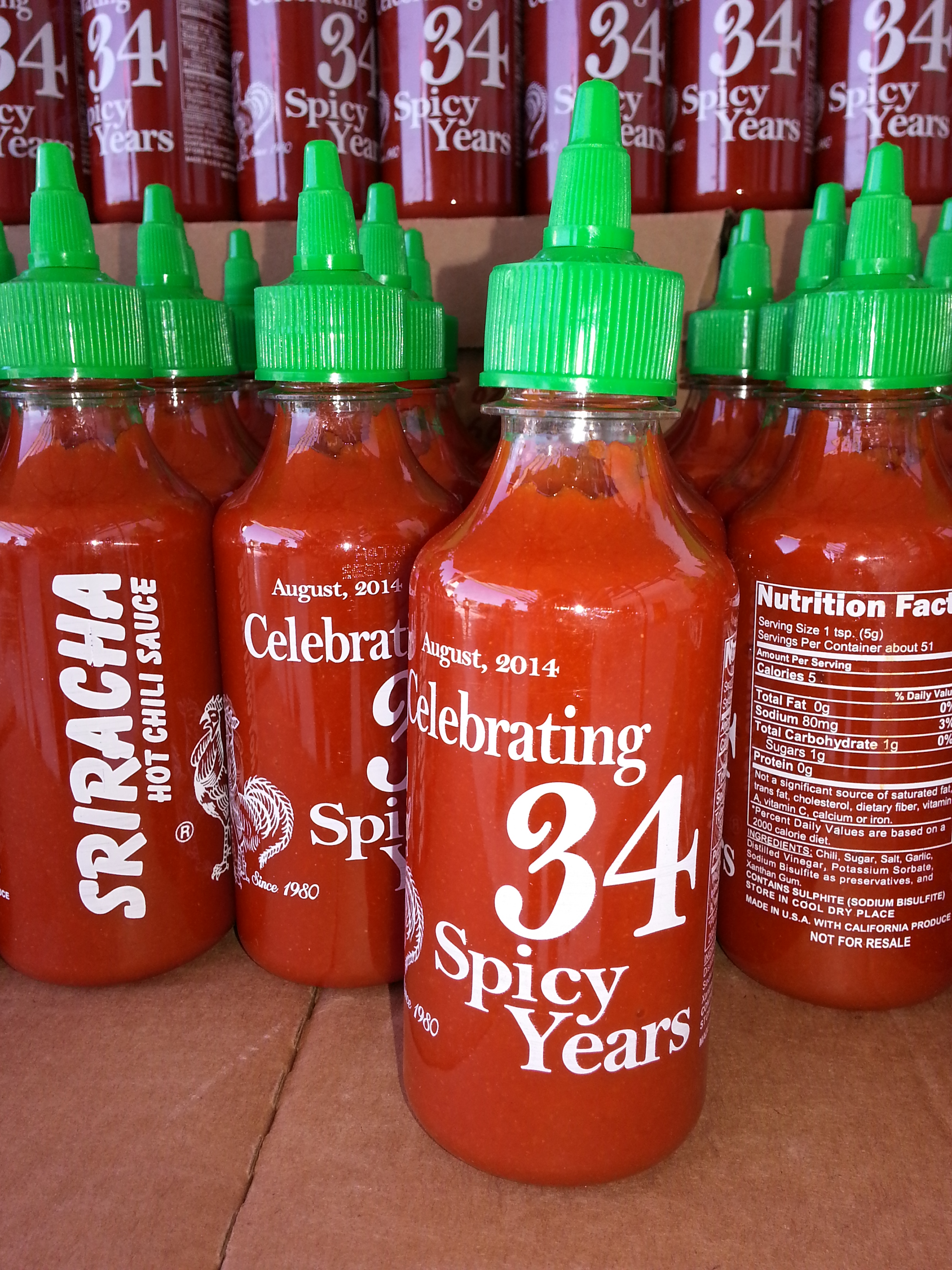
Huy Fong Foods Sriracha anniversary edition in 2014

In the United States, sriracha is associated with a jalapeño-based sauce produced by Huy Fong Foods, which is sometimes referred to as "rooster sauce" or "cock sauce", from the image of a rooster featured on each bottle. Other variations of sriracha have appeared in the U.S. market, including a sriracha that is aged in whiskey barrels. The Huy Fong Foods sriracha was first produced in the early 1980s for serving at American phở restaurants.

Various restaurants in the US, including Wendy's, Applebee's, P. F. Chang's, Jack in the Box, McDonald's, Subway, Taco Bell, White Castle, Gordon Biersch, Chick-fil-A, Firehouse Subs, Noodles & Company, Starbucks, and Burger King have incorporated sriracha into their dishes, sometimes mixing it with mayonnaise or into dipping sauces.

In 2022, Huy Fong Foods sriracha sauce temporarily halted production due to a shortage of chili peppers arising from a 2016 business dispute with Underwood Ranches, which claims Huy Fong Foods misled Underwood Ranches to invest in expanding, and then breached its oral contract to purchase at their originally agreed upon price point. The shortage caused the price of Huy Fong's sauce to increase to $30 a bottle or higher. The halt in production lasted for over a year, and Huy Fong has failed to acquire a consistent supply of peppers at its desired quality point since the dispute.

== See also ==
- List of hot sauces
- List of sauces
- Nam chim - Thai dipping sauces
- Nam phrik - Thai chili pastes
