= Casa de Fruta =

Roadside attraction in Santa Clara County, California

Coordinates: 36.9892°N 121.3825°W

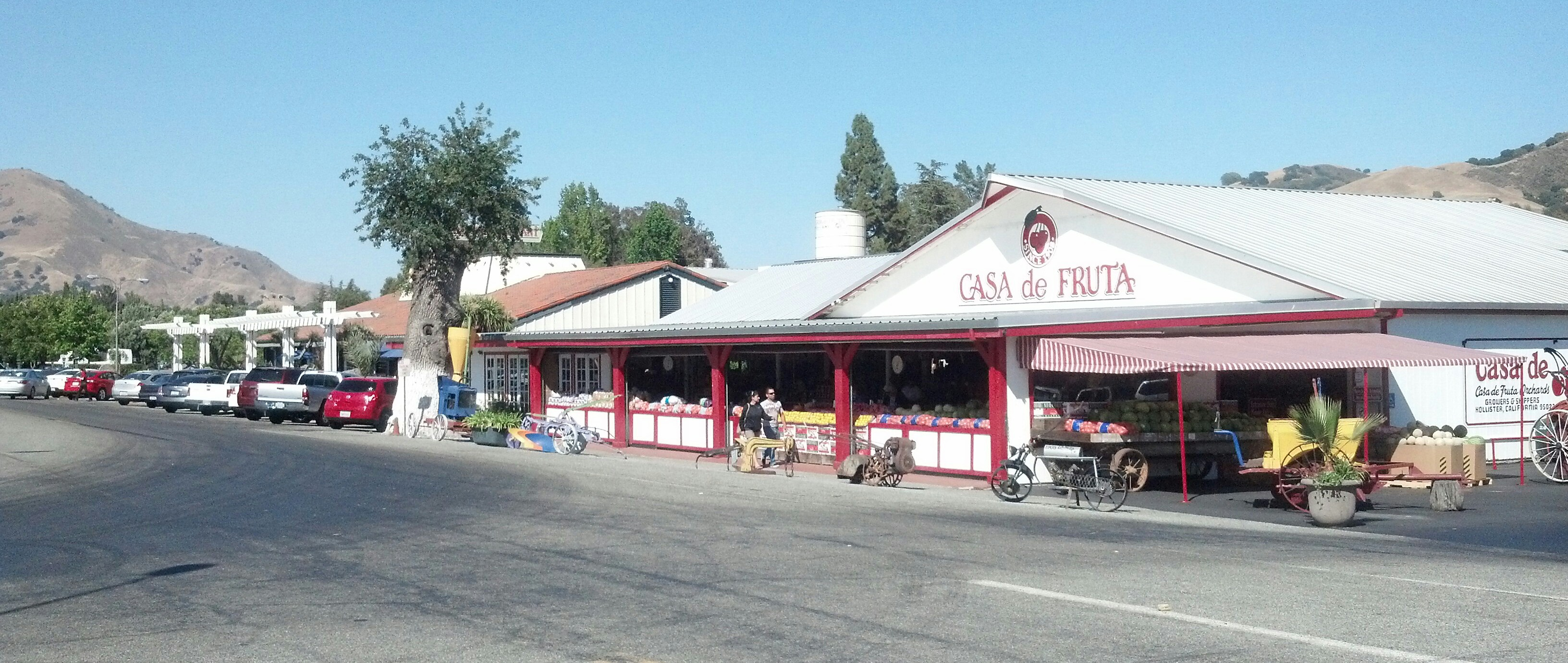
Casa de Fruta

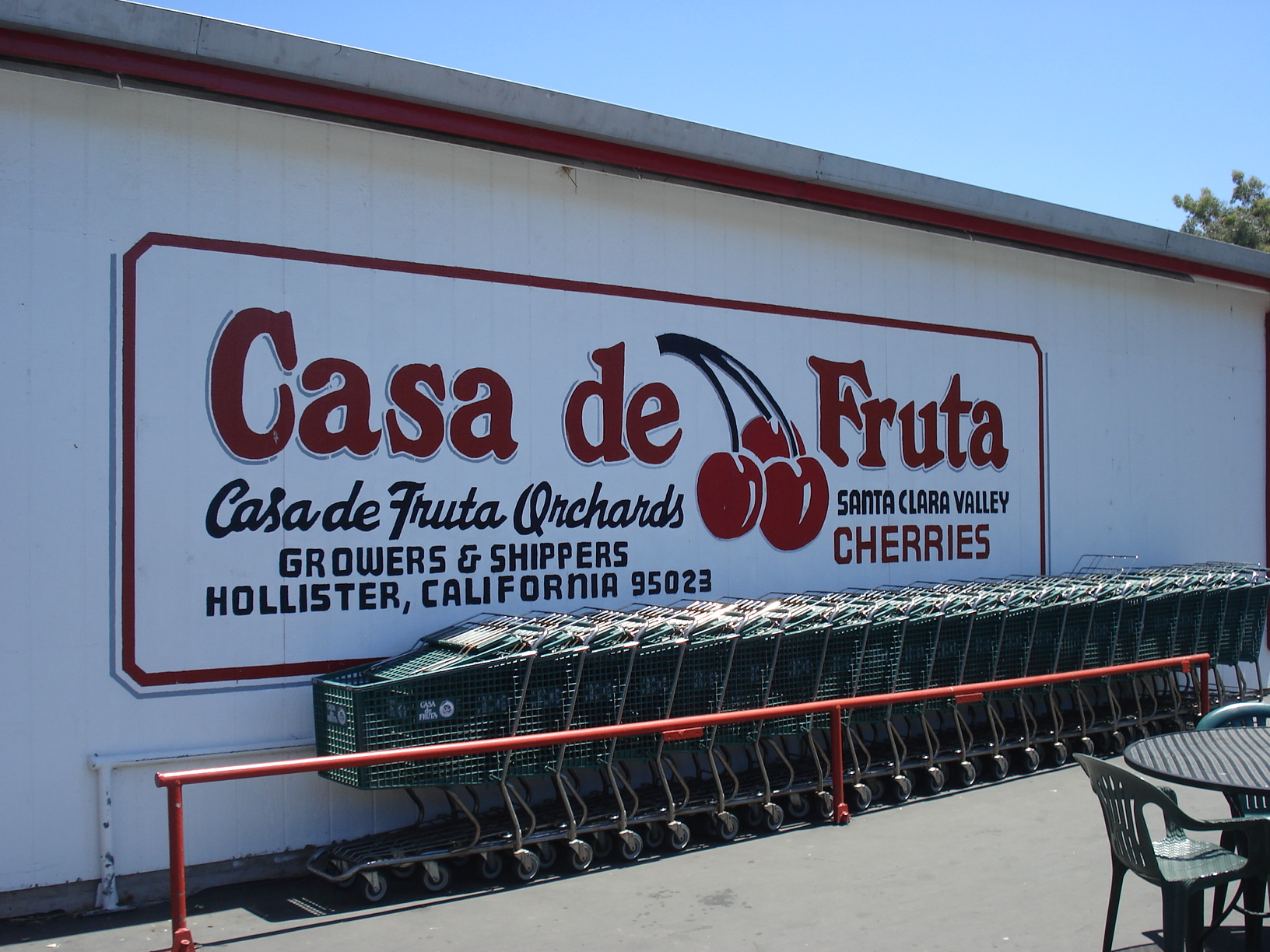
The "Casa de Fruta" sign on the outside wall of the building

Casa de Fruta (Spanish: literally "House of Fruit") is a large roadside attraction located in an unincorporated area of Santa Clara County, just west of the Merced County line, in the Pacheco Valley of Northern California, along State Route 152.

== History ==
The locale was known to American Indians and was first written about when Spanish missionaries discovered the artesian well there in the 1790s. The water source was popular during the Gold Rush.

Casa de Fruta was founded as an orchard by the Bisceglia brothers, who were Italian immigrants, in 1908. Three teenaged grand-nephews of the first owner of the orchard opened a roadside cherry stand in 1943, and eventually sold other fruits. In 1967 the remaining two grand-nephews opened a restaurant, Casa de Coffee, gas station, Casa de Diesel, children's playground (including Casa de Choo-Choo, a scale model miniature train with a full size man for the engineer, for children to ride), and gift shop, now known as Casa de Gifts. Other attractions include Casa de Sluice, Casa de Wine and Deli, Casa de Sweets, and roaming peacocks.

California State Route 152 passed in front of Case de Fruta as a two-lane highway for many years, but was widened to four lanes in 1992. The old alignment of the highway still exists as the Casa de Fruta Parkway, which is accessed via an exit from SR 152.

== Facilities and activities ==
Casa de Fruta today includes a recreational vehicle resort, hotel, candy store, wine shop, cafe, gas station, and a park with a carousel, playground, and miniature train. All are named with the "Casa de" theme: even the bathrooms in the Chevron Gas Station are called Casa de Restrooms. For 25 years cafe guests were greeted by the "Cup Flipper", who spun their coffee cups until they stood upright. This feat earned him an appearance on TV, in Late Night with David Letterman.

It is the current home of the Northern California Renaissance Faire, which takes place in September and October each year.
