= Huy Fong Foods =

American hot sauce company

Huy Fong Foods, Inc. 滙豐食品公司
- Type: Private
- Industry: Hot sauce
- Founded: February 5, 1980; 46 years ago in Los Angeles
- Founder: David Tran
- Headquarters: Irwindale, California, United States
- Key people: William Tran, President; Yassie Tran Holliday, Vice President
- Products: Asian-style hot sauce
- Owner: Tran family
- Number of employees: ≈200 (2023)
- Website: www.huyfong.com

Huy Fong Foods

Chinese name
- Traditional Chinese: 滙豐食品公司
- Simplified Chinese: 汇丰食品公司
Transcriptions
Standard Mandarin
- Hanyu Pinyin: Huìfēng Shípǐn Gōngsī
- Wade–Giles: Hui^{4}fong^{1} Shih^{2}p'in^{3} Kung^{1}ssu^{1}
Yue: Cantonese
- Jyutping: Wui^{6} Fung^{1} Sik^{6} ban^{2} Gung^{1} si^{1}

Vietnamese name
- Vietnamese alphabet: Công ty Thực phẩm Hối Phong
- Chữ Hán: 公司食品滙豐

Huy Fong Foods is an American hot sauce company based in Irwindale, California. It was founded by David Tran, a Vietnamese-born immigrant, beginning in 1980 on Spring Street in Los Angeles's Chinatown. It has grown to become one of the leaders in the Asian hot sauce market with its sriracha sauce, popularly referred to as "rooster sauce" or "cock sauce" due to the image of a rooster on the label.

== Products ==
The company's most popular product is its sriracha sauce. The primary ingredients are peppers, garlic, and sugar. It is currently Huy Fong Foods' best-known and best-selling item, easily recognized by its bright red color and its packaging: a clear plastic bottle with a green cap, text in five languages (Vietnamese, English, Chinese, French, and Spanish) and the rooster logo. One nickname for the product is "rooster sauce”, for the logo on the bottles. In contrast to similar hot sauces made by other manufacturers, Huy Fong's sriracha sauce does not contain fish extract, making it suitable for vegans.

Huy Fong also makes sambal oelek and chili garlic sauces.

== History ==
=== Founding and early history ===
Huy Fong Foods was founded by David Tran (born 1945), an ethnic Chinese businessman and a former Major in the South Vietnamese Army. Tran, after leaving Vietnam in a cargo boat, arrived in Boston in the spring of 1979 as a part of the migration of the Vietnamese boat people following the Vietnam War. Shortly after arriving in Boston, Tran called up his brother-in-law in Los Angeles, and decided to move there after learning that there were red peppers.

After arriving in Los Angeles, Tran established his own hot sauce company, which he named after the Huey Fong freighter that brought him to the United States. The rooster symbol that is a part of the Sriracha branding came from the fact that Tran was born in the Year of the Rooster on the Chinese zodiac. He incorporated Huy Fong Foods, Inc. in February 1980, within a month of arriving in Los Angeles. He had previously made hot sauce with his family while working as a cook in the South Vietnamese army. He began selling hot sauces to local Asian restaurants out of a van, making $2,300 in his first month in business.

Tran considers Huy Fong Foods to be a family business. His son William Tran is the company president and daughter Yassie Tran Holliday is vice president.

=== Production ===
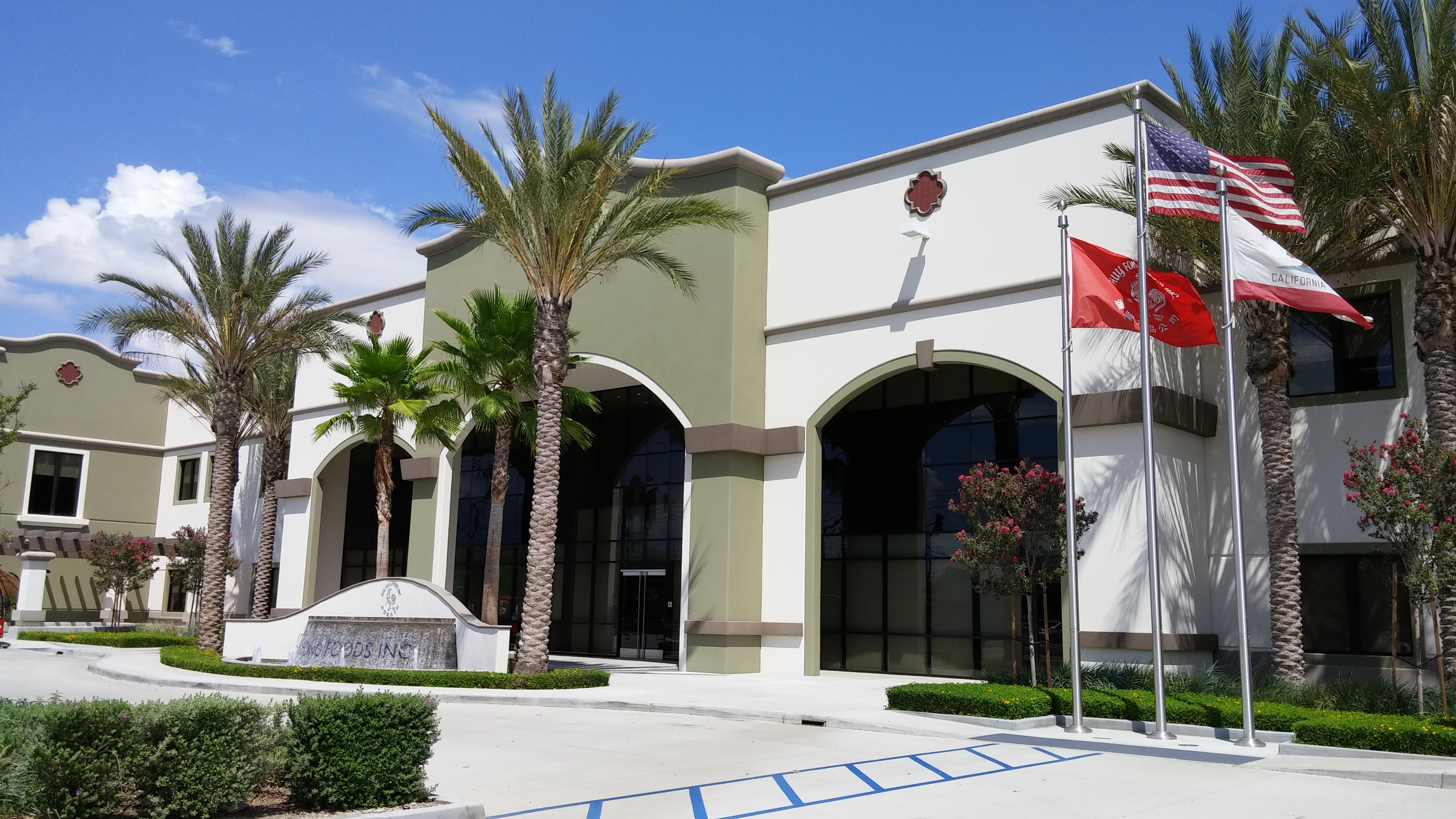
Huy Fong Foods Headquarters, Irwindale, California

In 1987, Huy Fong Foods relocated to a 68,000-square-foot (6,300 m^{2}) building in Rosemead, California, that once housed toymaker Wham-O. In 2010, the company opened a factory in Irwindale, California, on 23 acres (9.3 ha), a facility having 26,000 square feet (2,400 m^{2}) of office space, 150,000 square feet (14,000 m^{2}) of production space, and 480,000 square feet (45,000 m^{2}) of warehouse space, which is now the manufacturing site of all three of the brand's sauces. These sauces are produced on machinery that has been specially modified by David Tran, who taught himself machining and welding skills. Since 2014, the Irwindale factory has been open to visitors, and has become a tourist attraction.

The chili odor that emanated from the Irwindale factory upset the community's residents and the city of Irwindale filed a lawsuit against Huy Fong Foods in October 2013, claiming that the odor was a public nuisance and seeking an ex parte order to shut down the factory. Los Angeles Superior Court judge Robert H. O'Brien initially refused the emergency request, but less than a month later, he ordered the factory to partially shut down. The city dropped the lawsuit on May 29, 2014, following a meeting brokered by then-governor Jerry Brown between the city and the company.

In Huy Fong Foods’ production at these facilities, the company begins with purchase of chilis grown in Ventura, Los Angeles, and Kern counties and production of a mash from these; most of each year's chili mash is produced in just two months, during the autumn harvest. Earlier, the company used serrano chilis but found them difficult to harvest. The product made from the natural mash is processed such that the final product contains no artificial ingredients.

The company has never advertised its products, relying instead on word of mouth. Production and sales of the sauces are sizeable; in 2001, the company was estimated to have sold 6,000 tons of chili products, with sales of approximately $12 million. In 2010, the company produced 20 million bottles of sauce in a year. As of 2012 it had grown to sales of more than $60 million a year. In 2019, the company had a 10% share of the $1.55 billion hot sauce market in the United States. The company generated over $150 million in revenue as of 2022.

The company has warned customers about counterfeit versions of its sauces.

=== Pepper supply ===
In 1988, Huy Fong Foods entered a partnership with Underwood Ranches, a farm in Ventura County, after Underwood Ranches' owner Craig Underwood wrote to Tran with an offer to grow jalapeños for Huy Fong Foods. The partnership would last for 28 years. Huy Fong foods initially required more peppers than Underwood ranches could produce, so it contracted with other farmers as needed. As Huy Fong Foods' success grew, so too did Underwood Ranches' pepper production. By 2006, Underwood Ranches was growing 95% of peppers used by Huy Fong Foods. Huy Fong Foods' relationship with Underwood Ranches ended in 2016 after Tran attempted to lure Underwood Ranches' chief operations officer to work for Chilico, a company formed by Tran that would obtain and manage the peppers used by Huy Fong Foods, and tried to drastically cut payments to the ranch. Underwood Ranches claims this left them with no other option but to end the partnership. Huy Fong Foods filed a lawsuit against Underwood Ranches seeking a $1.4 million refund of payments Huy Fong Foods had made in 2016. Underwood Ranches filed a cross-complaint against Huy Fong Foods alleging breach of contract, promissory estoppel and fraud. The jury unanimously ruled in favor of Underwood on the grounds of breach of contract and fraud. Huy Fong Foods was ordered to pay Underwood Ranches $23.3 million in compensation for damages.

In June 2022, Huy Fong Foods temporarily halted the production of the chili sauce. This decision was prompted by a severe shortage of chili peppers caused by a drought in Mexico that affected the quality of the peppers. While production soon resumed in the fall, the company soon declared another "unprecedented inventory shortage" in April 2023, offering no estimate as to when this shortage might be resolved. An August 2023 CNBC special program claims that the shortage was caused by Huy Fong switching pepper suppliers, as Underwood still has production capacity (land, irrigation, processing) for the needed peppers.

The company again announced production suspension in May 2024 until September 2024 at the earliest due to chili sourcing, although their competitors are not experiencing shortages.

== Awards and recognition ==
- Bon Appétit Ingredient of the Year (2010): In December 2009, Bon Appétit magazine named its Sriracha sauce Ingredient of the Year for 2010.
- ChefsBest Excellence Award (2016): Won for taste and quality in blind taste test.
- National Restaurant Association (NRA) FABI award (2017): Won for culinary innovation.
- NRA FABI award (2020): A product made in partnership with Red Gold, Huy Fong Sriracha Bloody Mary Mix won again for innovation.
