= North Fork San Gabriel River =

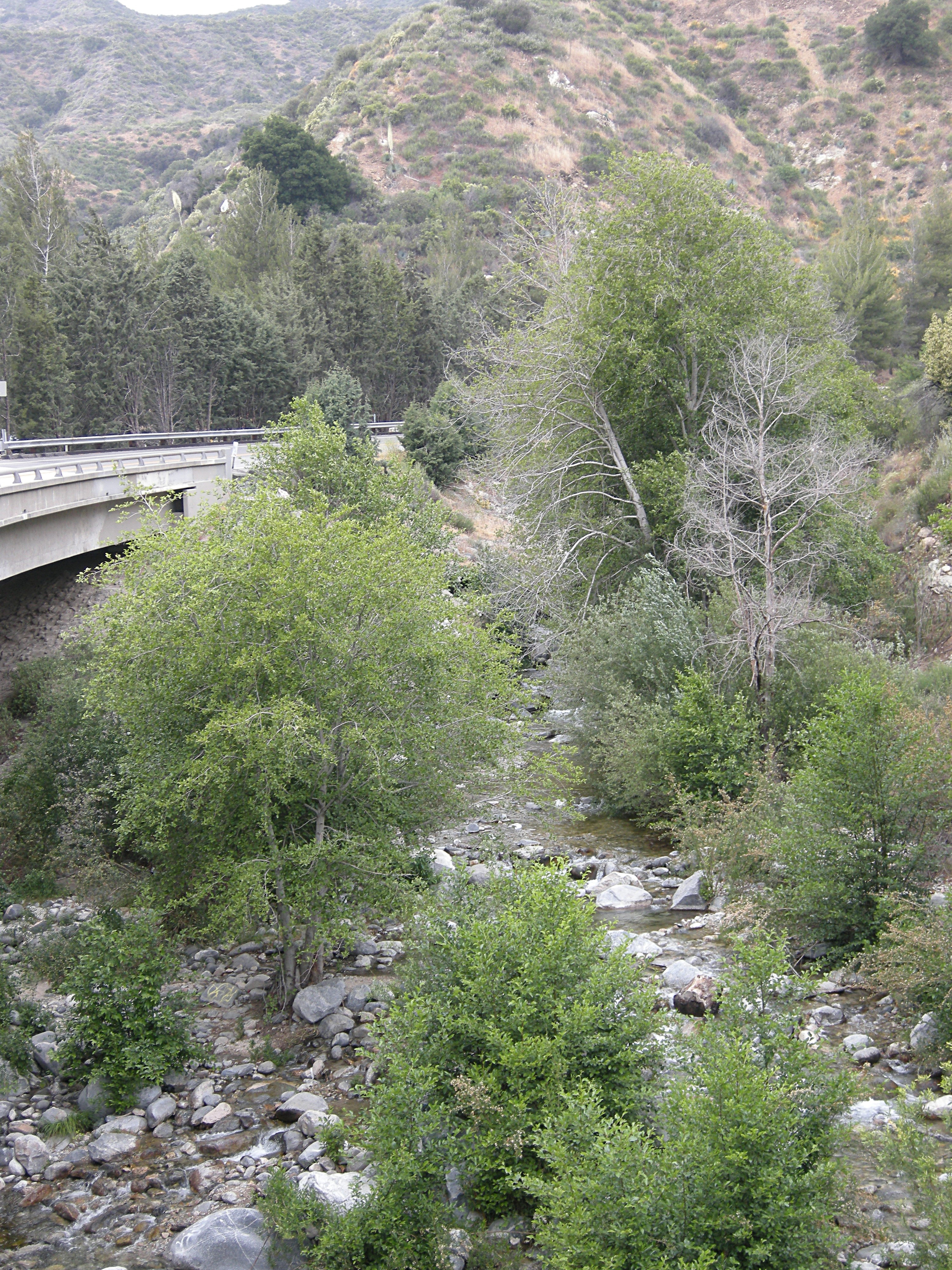

- Location of the North Fork in California

Location
- Country: United States
- State: California

Physical characteristics
- Source: Near Falling Springs
  - location: Angeles National Forest, San Gabriel Mountains
  - coordinates: 34°17′27″N 117°50′25″W
  - elevation: 3,275 ft (998 m)
- Mouth: West Fork San Gabriel River
  - location: Near San Gabriel Reservoir
  - coordinates: 34°14′29″N 117°52′08″W
  - elevation: 1,552 ft (473 m)
- Length: 4.5 mi (7.2 km)
- Basin size: 18.6 sq mi (48 km^{2})
- Discharge
  - location: Camp Rincon, near the mouth
  - average: 6.6 cu ft/s (0.19 m^{3}/s)
  - minimum: 1.16 cu ft/s (0.033 m^{3}/s)
  - maximum: 276 cu ft/s (7.8 m^{3}/s)

The North Fork San Gabriel River is a tributary, 4.5 miles (7.2 km) long, of the West Fork San Gabriel River in the Angeles National Forest of Los Angeles County, California. The river originates at the confluence of Soldier Creek and Coldbrook Creek in the San Gabriel Mountains below the village of Falling Springs and flows down a steep canyon in a southerly direction to join the West Fork near San Gabriel Reservoir. The North Fork Canyon provides the route for SR 39, one of the main access roads to the Angeles Forest.

Crystal Lake, the only natural lake in the San Gabriel Mountains, is located above the headwaters of the North Fork in the Crystal Lake Recreation Area at an elevation of 5,600 feet (1,700 m). The area has campsites, trails and picnic areas and is one of the more popular sites in the Angeles National Forest.

== See also ==
- List of rivers of California
