= Morris Reservoir =

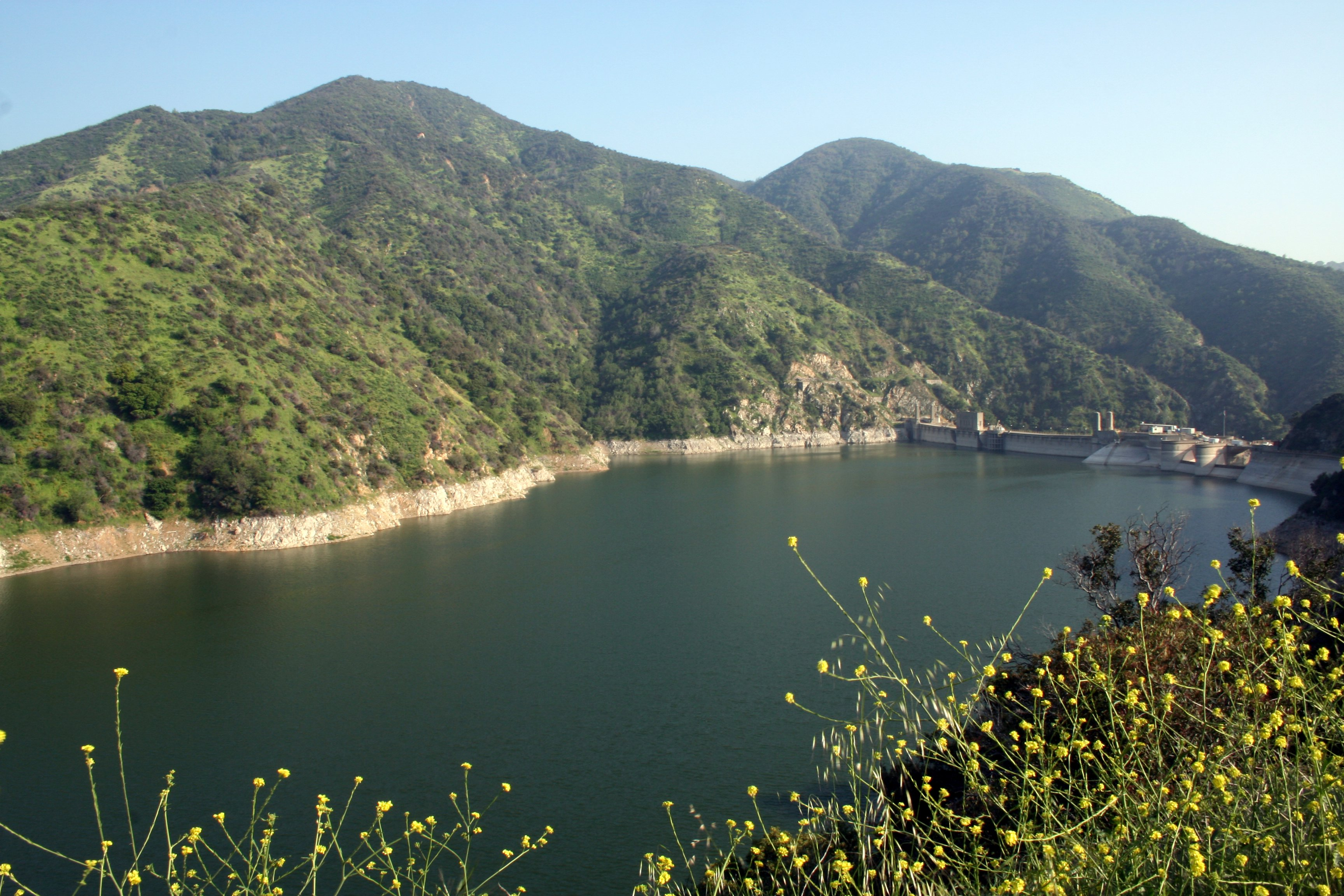

- Location within California Location within the United States
- Location: Angeles National Forest, Los Angeles County, California
- Coordinates: 34°10′27″N 117°52′49″W
- Type: Reservoir
- Primary outflows: San Gabriel River
- Basin countries: United States
- Surface elevation: 1,145 ft (349 m)

Morris Reservoir is located in the San Gabriel Mountains, within the Angeles National Forest, in Los Angeles County, California.

It is impounded by Morris Dam, which was completed in 1935. Morris Dam is a gravity dam rising 245 feet (75 m) above the San Gabriel River stream bed.

== Geography ==
The reservoir is located alongside California State Route 39, approximately 5 miles (8.0 km) north of the city of Azusa. Morris Reservoir is just downstream from the San Gabriel Dam. The mean water elevation is about 1,100 feet (340 m), when the reservoir is at capacity.

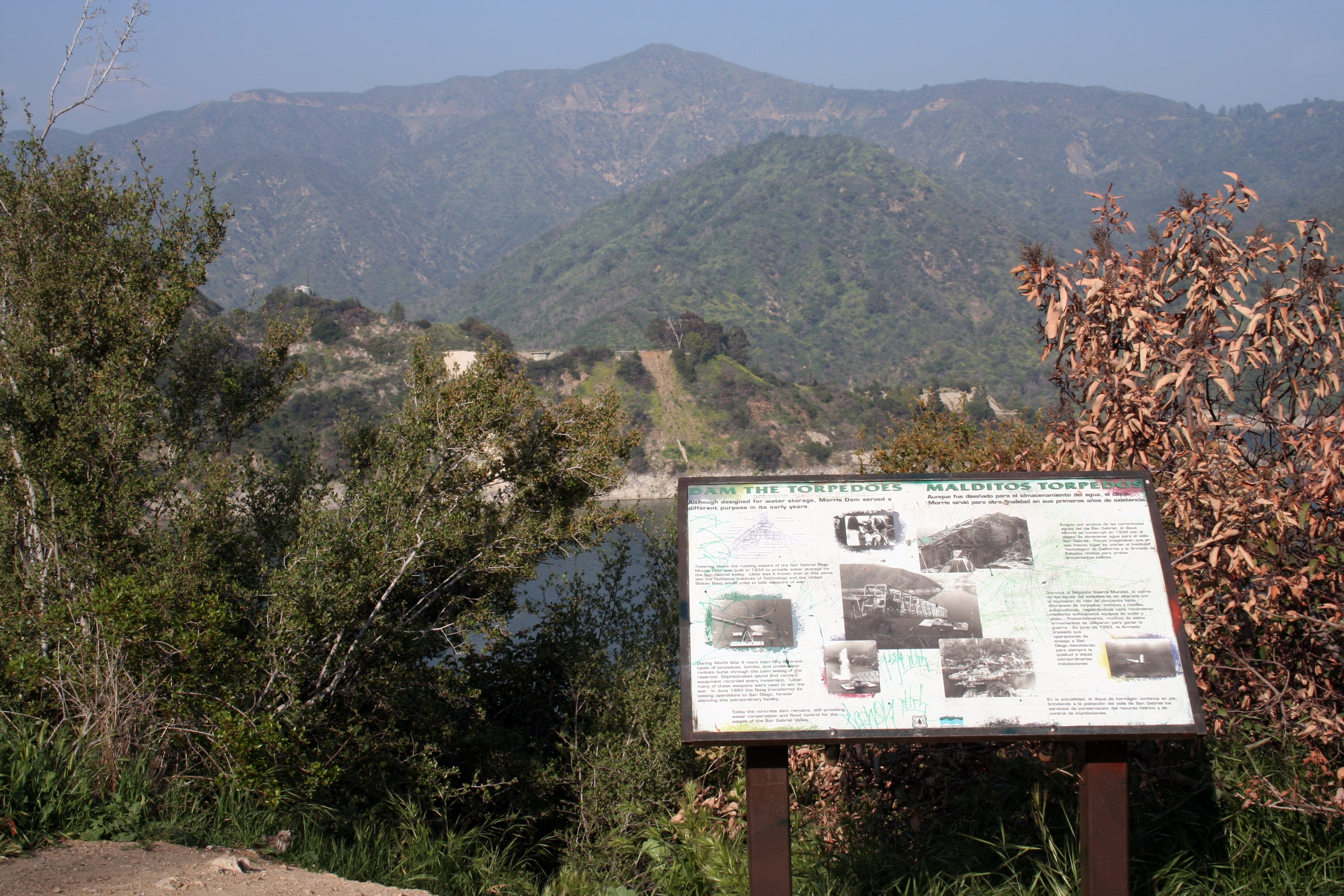

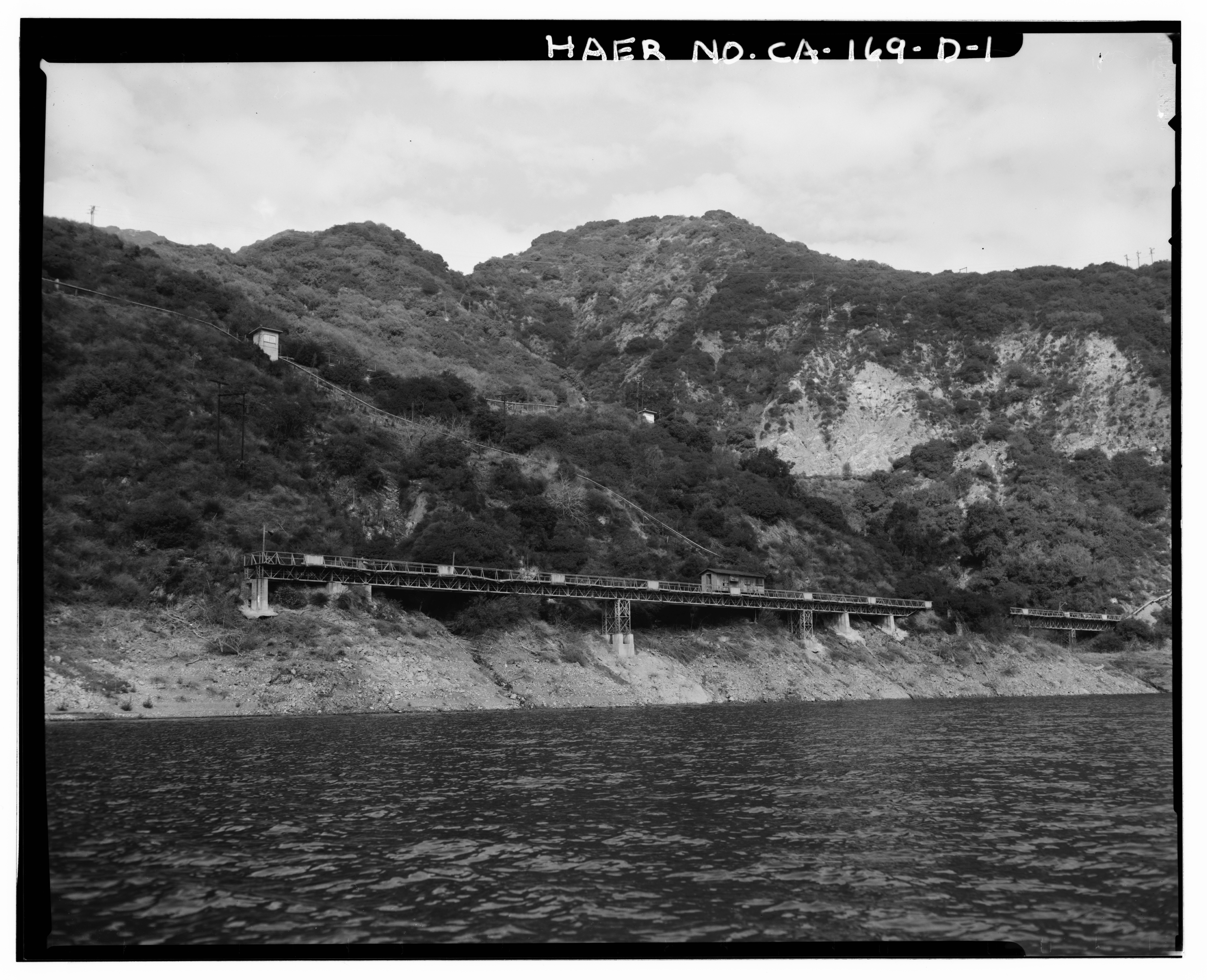
Camera launcher, at Morris Reservoir Naval Weapons Test Site.

== Morris Reservoir Naval Weapons Test Site ==
The reservoir and its slopes were the Morris Reservoir Naval Weapons Test Site, a naval weapons test facility, from World War II through the 1990s. The reservoir was transferred to the Los Angeles County Department of Public Works in 1995.

The test facility was established by Caltech, which was developing weapons for the Navy at its Naval Ordnance Test Station (NOTS) at China Lake (town), near Ridgecrest, California. It today is now known as the Naval Air Weapons Station China Lake, and is still the primary proving ground for naval weapons systems. Because China Lake is a dry lake in the Mojave Desert, Caltech opened this substation at the Morris Reservoir, near their campus, north of Azusa in the San Gabriel Mountains.

This site was used especially for the development of submarine-based warfare systems, including torpedoes, bombs, and submarine-launched missiles like the Polaris rocket, the first ballistic missile that could be launched from submerged submarines.

Most of the buildings at the site have been removed, and the site is being restored to a "natural" state, and may once again be open to the public.

== See also ==
- Reservoirs in Los Angeles County, California
- List of lakes in California
