= East Fork San Gabriel River =

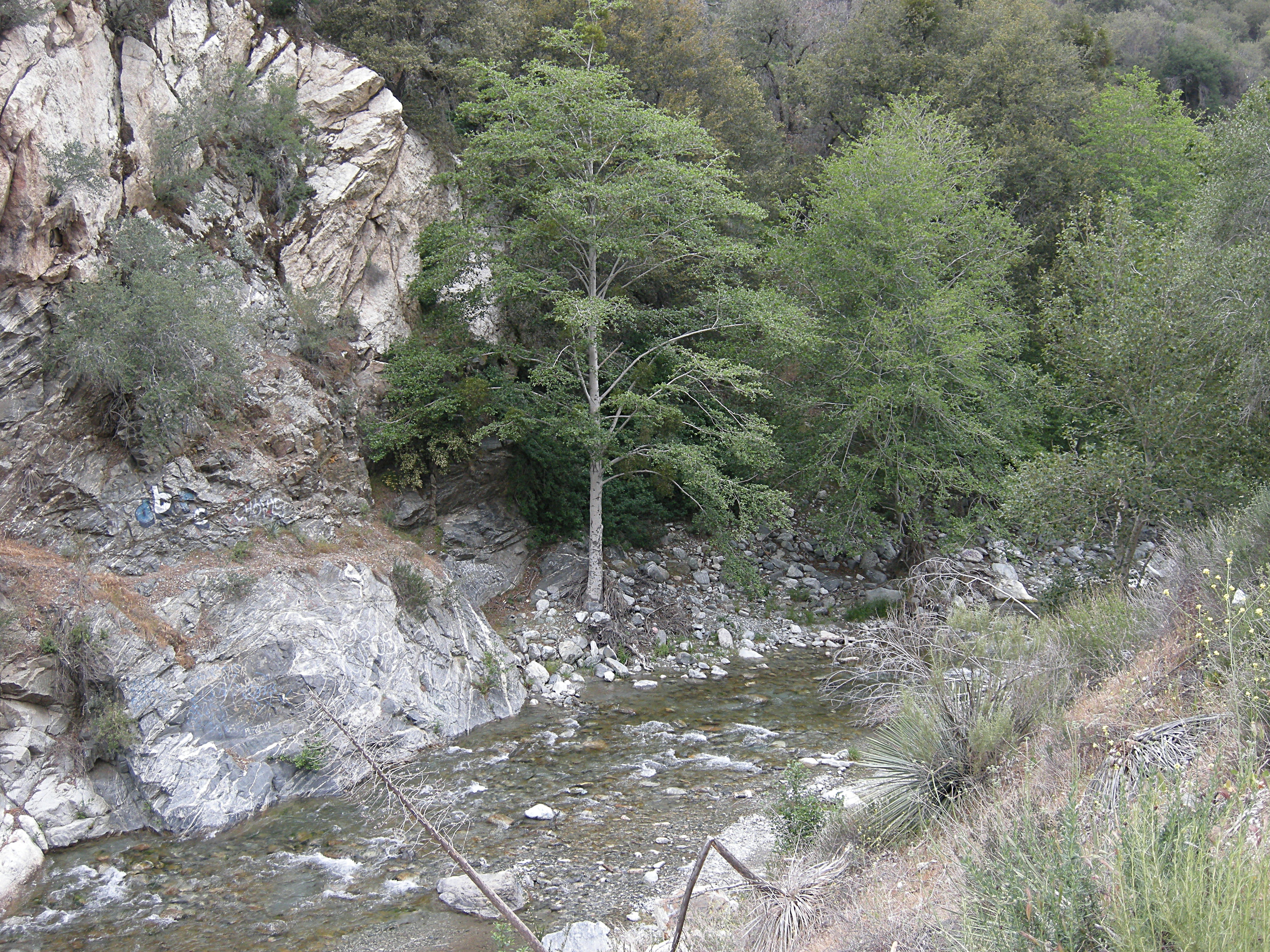

- Location of the East Fork in California

Location
- Country: United States
- State: California

Physical characteristics
- Source: San Gabriel Mountains
  - location: Angeles National Forest
  - coordinates: 34°20′35″N 117°43′30″W
  - elevation: 4,483 ft (1,366 m)
- Mouth: San Gabriel River
  - location: San Gabriel Reservoir
  - coordinates: 34°14′23″N 117°51′24″W
  - elevation: 1,473 ft (449 m)
- Length: 17 mi (27 km)
- Discharge
  - location: Near Camp Bonita
  - average: 72.3 cu ft/s (2.05 m^{3}/s)
  - minimum: 2.28 cu ft/s (0.065 m^{3}/s)
  - maximum: 46,000 cu ft/s (1,300 m^{3}/s)

The East Fork is the largest headwater of the San Gabriel River in Los Angeles County, California, United States. It originates at the crest of the San Gabriel Mountains in the Angeles National Forest, at the confluence of the Prairie Fork and Vincent Gulch near Mount Baden-Powell. It then flows south and west for 17 miles (27 km) to San Gabriel Reservoir, where it joins with the West Fork San Gabriel River. Although the East Fork is colloquially considered a separate river (to distinguish it from the West Fork), the U.S. Geological Survey officially lists the East Fork as the upper part of the main stem San Gabriel River, a fact that is shown by topographical maps of the area.

The major tributaries of the East Fork, from upstream to downstream, are the Prairie Fork, the Fish Fork (which rises near Mount San Antonio/Mount Baldy, the highest summit in the range), the Iron Fork and Cattle Canyon. The "Narrows" of the San Gabriel River is the deepest river gorge in the San Gabriel Mountains, flowing as much as 6,000 feet (1,800 m) below the nearby peak of Iron Mountain. Much of the upper half of the river is within the Sheep Mountain Wilderness.

A major point of interest on the East Fork is the Bridge to Nowhere, a 120-foot (37 m) high concrete arch bridge that was once part of the East Fork Road before the rest of the road was destroyed by flooding in 1938. The East Fork Road was originally intended to connect the Los Angeles Basin to the Angeles Crest Highway, but was never completed due to the high cost of cutting and tunneling through the rugged East Fork Canyon. A later attempt to build a road through the East Fork via Shoemaker Canyon, in the 1950s, was also aborted due to lack of funds.

Today the East Fork Road provides access to the Heaton Flats trailhead, a popular jumping-off points for visitors to the San Gabriel Mountains. The stretch of the river along and above East Fork Road is one of the most heavily used parts of the Angeles National Forest, and is visited by hikers, campers and recreational gold miners alike – as many as 15,000 per day in the summer, which has had considerable environmental impacts on the East Fork.

== See also ==
- List of rivers of California
