= West Fork San Gabriel River =

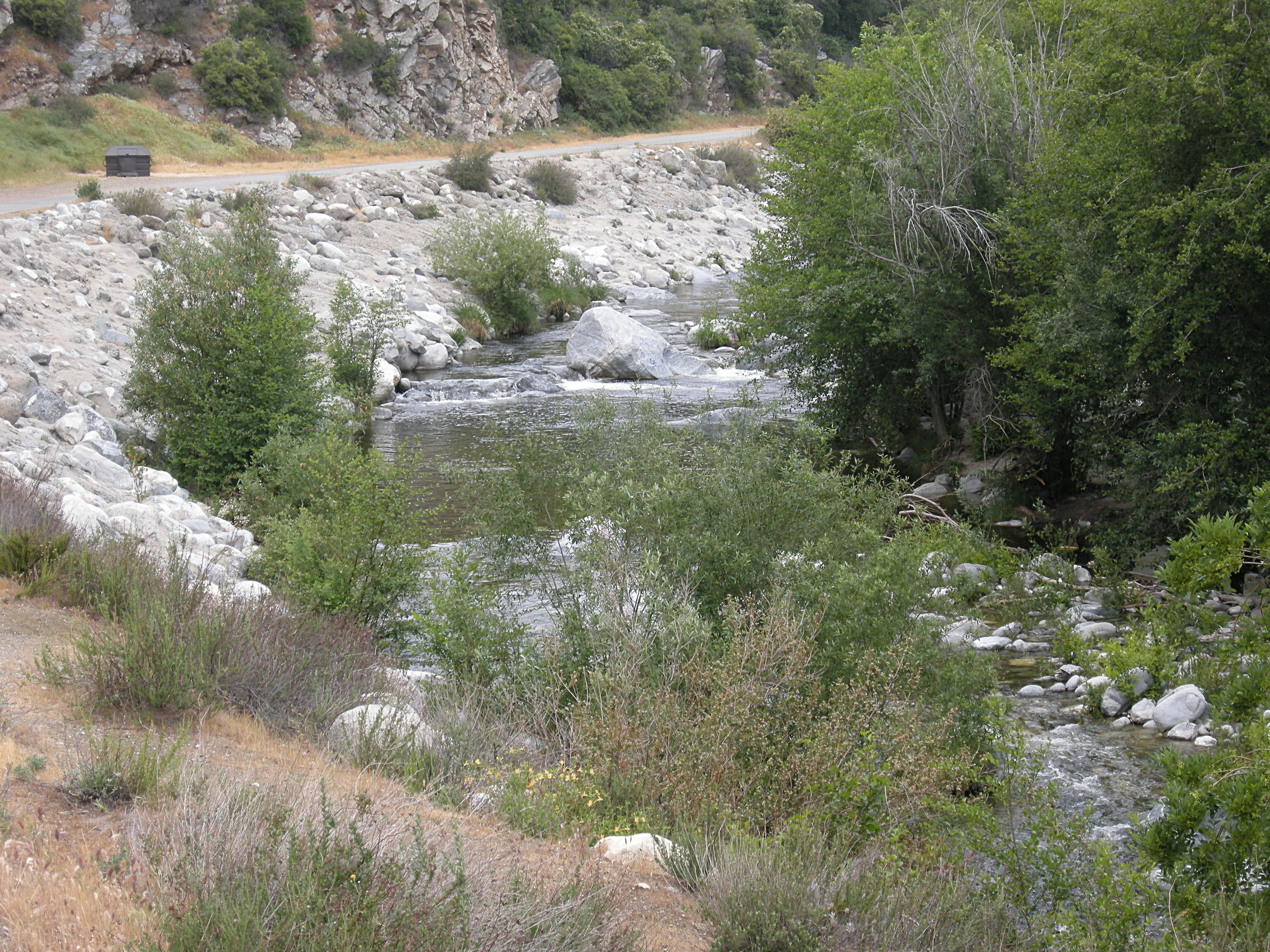

- Location of the West Fork in California

Location
- Country: United States
- State: California

Physical characteristics
- Source: Red Box Gap
  - location: Angeles National Forest
  - coordinates: 34°15′29″N 118°06′13″W
  - elevation: 4,530 ft (1,380 m)
- Mouth: San Gabriel River
  - location: San Gabriel Reservoir
  - coordinates: 34°14′23″N 117°51′24″W
  - elevation: 1,473 ft (449 m)
- Length: 19 mi (31 km)
- Basin size: 104 sq mi (270 km^{2})
- Discharge
  - location: Camp Rincon, near the mouth
  - average: 71 cu ft/s (2.0 m^{3}/s)
  - minimum: 1.7 cu ft/s (0.048 m^{3}/s)
  - maximum: 34,000 cu ft/s (960 m^{3}/s)

The West Fork is one of two major streams, the other being the East Fork, that combine to form the San Gabriel River in Los Angeles County, California. The West Fork flows for 19 miles (31 km) in an easterly direction from its origins at Red Box Gap, in the San Gabriel Mountains, eventually reaching San Gabriel Reservoir where it is bridged by SR 39 just above its mouth.

The major tributaries of the West Fork, from upstream to downstream, are Devil Creek, Bear Creek and the North Fork San Gabriel River. A large portion of the watershed is situated in the San Gabriel Wilderness, whose southern boundary is formed by the West Fork. Cogswell Dam impounds the river to create the 10,785-acre-foot (13,303,000 m^{3}) Cogswell Reservoir, whose primary function is flood and silt control for the San Gabriel Valley. The West Fork of the San Gabriel River is a refuge for Southern California wild rainbow trout.

== See also ==
- List of rivers of California
