= Morris Dam =

Samuel B. Morris Dam
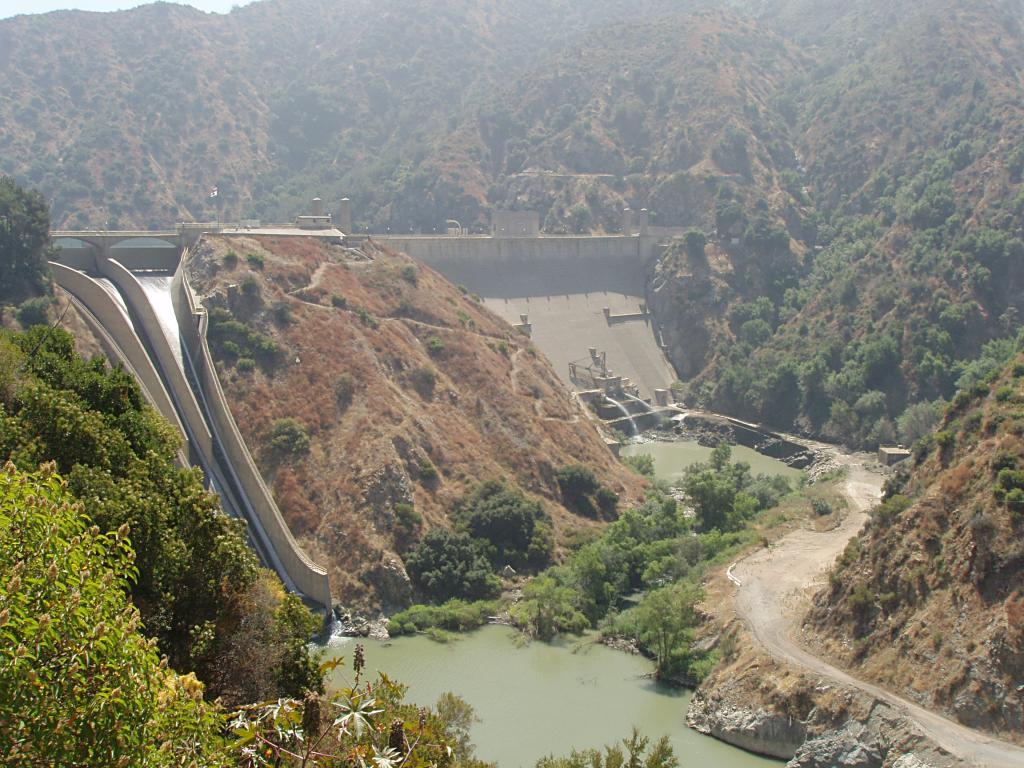
- Morris Dam viewed from the unofficial overlook on State Route 39 (Spillway on left and dam on right)
- Interactive map of Samuel B. Morris Dam
- Country: United States
- Location: Los Angeles County, California
- Coordinates: 34°10′29″N 117°52′52″W
- Status: Operational
- Construction began: 1932; 94 years ago
- Opening date: 1934; 92 years ago
- Construction cost: $25 million
- Owner: Los Angeles County Flood Control District

Dam and spillways
- Type of dam: Concrete gravity
- Impounds: San Gabriel River
- Height: 245 ft (75 m) (Note: Height measurements range from 245 to 325 feet. 245 feet is the most commonly referenced measure, but 325 feet may be the distance from the dam crest to the foundation. Further research needed.)
- Length: 750 ft (230 m)
- Spillway type: Gated concrete overflow
- Spillway capacity: 80,000 cu ft/s (2,300 m^{3}/s)

Reservoir
- Creates: Morris Reservoir
- Total capacity: 39,300 acre⋅ft (48,500,000 m^{3}) (nominal); 27,800 acre⋅ft (34,300,000 m^{3}) (current)
- Surface area: 417 acres (169 ha)
- Normal elevation: 1,152 ft (351 m) (Note: Pool elevation at spillway according to USGS topo maps)

Power Station
- Installed capacity: N/A

Morris Dam (officially the Samuel B. Morris Dam) is a concrete gravity dam across the San Gabriel River in the U.S. state of California. It impounds Morris Reservoir, directly downstream of San Gabriel Dam.

The dam was built in the 1930s as a water supply facility for the city of Pasadena, but is now mostly utilized for flood control and flow regulation for groundwater recharge. Situated in northern Los Angeles County, the dam impounds the 417-acre (169 ha) Morris Reservoir in the Angeles National Forest, a few miles northeast of Azusa. From the 1940s to the 1990s, the reservoir was also used for underwater missile testing by the United States military.

== Design and location ==
This dam sits south of Silver Mountain and north of Glendora Ridge, which flank the 1,500-foot (460 m) deep San Gabriel Canyon. It is roughly 37 miles (60 km) upstream of the San Gabriel River's mouth at the Pacific Ocean, and 6 miles (9.7 km) downstream of the river's beginning at the confluence of its East and West Forks. Morris Reservoir is about 3 miles (4.8 km) long and 1,152 feet (351 m) above sea level at maximum pool, covering 417 acres (169 ha). The dam's crest itself is at an elevation of 1,161 feet (354 m).

Serving mainly flood control, flow regulation and groundwater recharge purposes, the slightly arched Art Deco-style gravity dam is 245 feet (75 m) high and 750 feet (230 m) long. Its spillway, located slightly north of the main structure, is a concrete-lined chute controlled by three steel drum gates. The reservoir created by the dam, when first put into use, was capable of storing 39,300 acre-feet (48,500,000 m^{3}). Due to sedimentation though since that time, its capacity has been reduced by about 29%. At present, the reservoir when filled holds approximately 27,800 acre-feet (34,300,000 m^{3}).

== History ==
Morris Dam was originally slated to be called Pine Canyon Dam, but was renamed for the chief engineer of construction, Samuel Brooks Morris of the Pasadena Water Department. With the dam envisioned as a private structure for Pasadena, groundbreaking was in April 1932 and construction was completed in May 1934, four months behind schedule. Upon completion the dam was dedicated by former United States President Herbert Hoover. In 1935, contrary to its original purpose, Morris Dam was sold to the Metropolitan Water District of Southern California (MWD), which owned it through most of the 20th century.

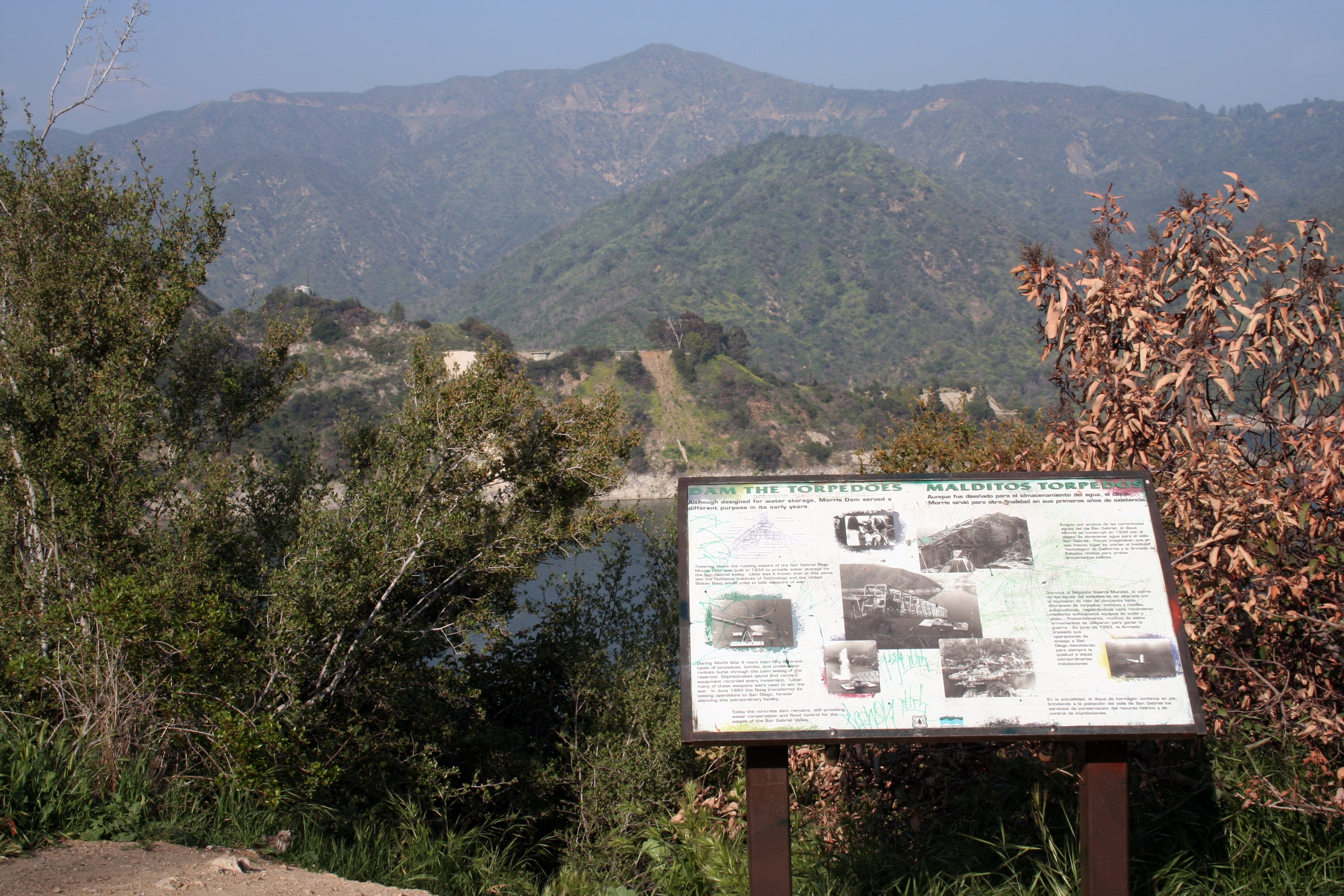
The plaque commemorating the old naval weapons test center at Morris Dam

The dam was completed prior to the catastrophic Los Angeles Flood of 1938, the most severe flood recorded in Southern California since the Great Flood of 1862. Along with San Gabriel Dam, which at the time was under construction, the Cogswell Dam upstream and the Morris Dam greatly reduced the flood peak on the San Gabriel River, saving downstream cities millions of dollars' worth of damages. If it were not for the three dams, the flow past Azusa may have exceeded 150,000 cu ft/s (4,200 m^{3}/s), but was limited to just 65,700 cu ft/s (1,860 m^{3}/s), with Morris Dam alone reducing the flood peak by some 30,000 cu ft/s (850 m^{3}/s).

In 2024, the dam was dedicated as a National Historic Civil Engineering Landmark by the American Society of Civil Engineers.

=== Morris Reservoir Naval Weapons Test Site ===
Beginning in World War II, Morris Reservoir was used for the Morris Reservoir Naval Weapons Test Site for the U.S. Navy in conjunction with the California Institute of Technology. A wide variety of weapons, including torpedoes and ballistic missiles, had their trial runs here. Testing continued until the 1990s, when most of the structures at the associated military compound were demolished. However, the concrete foundations remain and are easily seen from State Route 39, which runs past the dam and reservoir. In 1995, MWD sold the dam to the Los Angeles County Department of Public Works, which continues to operate it and the reservoir today.

== See also ==
- Los Angeles County Department of Public Works dams
- List of reservoirs and dams in California
