= San Gabriel Dam =

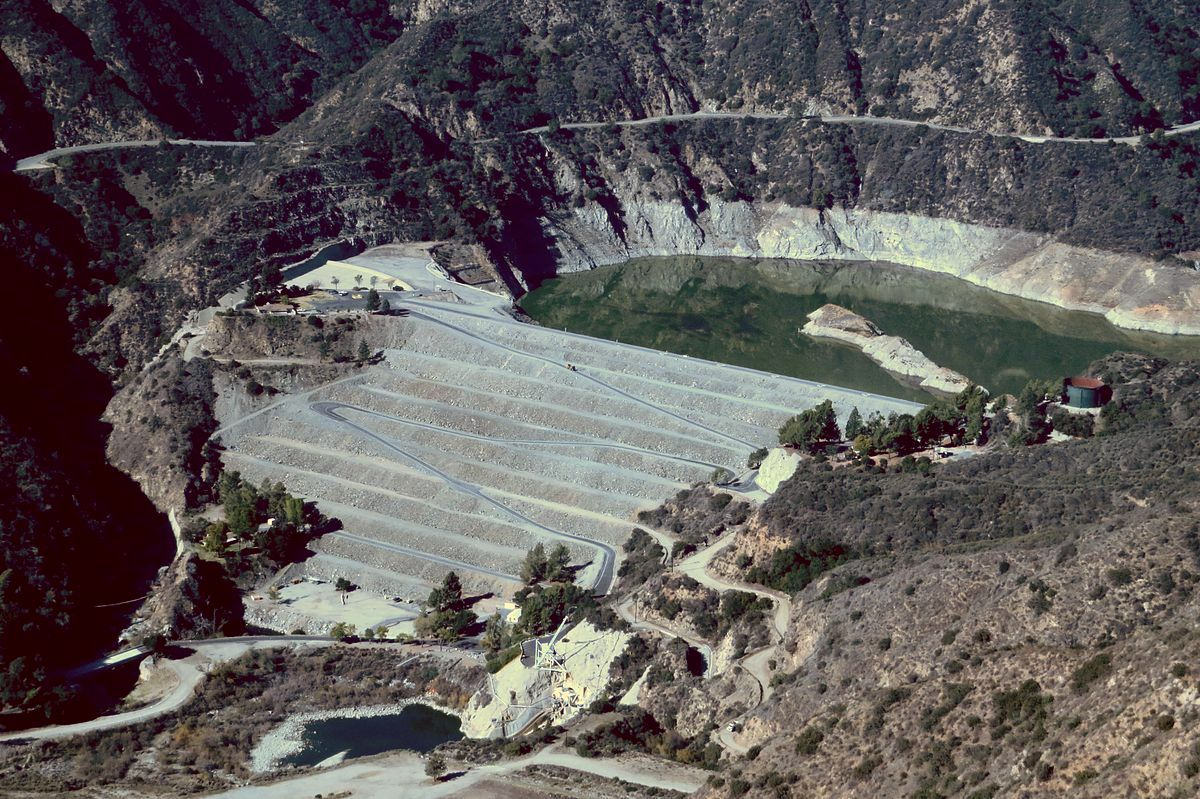
- The dam seen from Glendora Mountain Road
- Interactive map of San Gabriel Dam
- Country: United States
- Location: Los Angeles County, California
- Coordinates: 34°12′20″N 117°51′33″W
- Construction began: 1932; 94 years ago
- Opening date: 1939; 87 years ago
- Construction cost: $17 million
- Owner: Los Angeles County Flood Control District

Dam and spillways
- Type of dam: Rock-fill
- Impounds: San Gabriel River
- Height: 315 ft (96 m)
- Length: 1,520 ft (460 m)
- Spillway type: Ungated overflow

Reservoir
- Creates: San Gabriel Reservoir
- Total capacity: 44,183 acre⋅ft (54,499 dam^{3})
- Catchment area: 205 sq mi (530 km^{2})
- Surface area: 525 acres (212 ha)

Power Station
- Operator: City of Azusa
- Commission date: 1940
- Installed capacity: 3 MW
- Annual generation: 4,464,000 KWh

San Gabriel Dam is a rock-fill dam on the San Gabriel River in Los Angeles County, California, within the Angeles National Forest. Completed in 1939, the dam impounds the main stem of the San Gabriel River about 2.5 miles (4.0 km) downstream from the confluence of the river's East and West Forks, which drain a large portion of the San Gabriel Mountains. It is located directly upstream from the Morris Dam. The dam provides flood control, groundwater recharge flows and hydroelectricity for the heavily populated San Gabriel Valley in the Greater Los Angeles metropolitan area.

== History ==
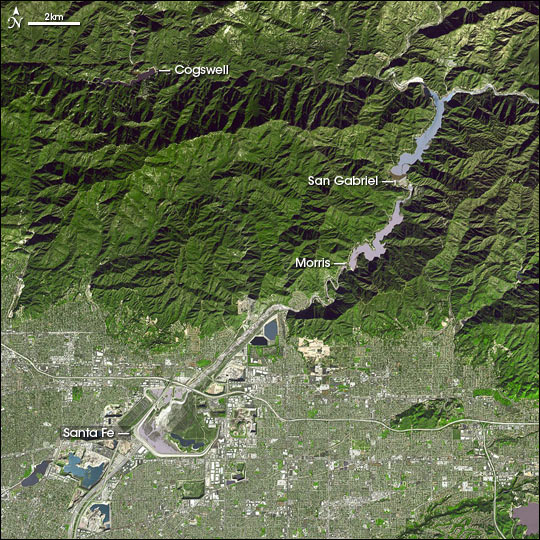
Satellite view showing four major dams in the San Gabriel River system. San Gabriel (above right) was built in conjunction with Cogswell (top left) in the 1930s.

In the 1920s, the Los Angeles County Flood Control District proposed to impound the San Gabriel River just below the confluence of the East and West forks with a 512-foot (156 m) high, 2,500-foot (760 m) long concrete arch dam to capture floods and provide water conservation. To be named the San Gabriel Forks Dam, the project was canceled by the State Engineer after having convened an inquiry to investigate problems which were occurring at San Gabriel Dam site, including a landslide that destroyed a large portion of the construction site, in early November 1929. The inquiry panel concluded and issued a report to the State Engineer stating that the proposed dam "cannot be constructed without creating a menace to life and property."

Subsequently, the design of the San Gabriel River flood control project was changed from one large dam to two smaller dams: San Gabriel No. 1 (San Gabriel Dam), about 2 miles (3.2 km) below the original Forks site, and San Gabriel No. 2 (Cogswell Dam), on the West Fork about 15 miles (24 km) above the confluence. The cost of San Gabriel No. 1 was greatly understated, creating a scandal; in context with the Great Depression, the Los Angeles Times observed that "it is not now necessary to gamble $26 million on a [troubled and wasteful agency]". The bond measure necessary for financing of the project was defeated by a narrow margin of 52 to 48 percent. As a result, the city turned to the federal Public Works Administration for money to complete the project.

The San Gabriel No. 1 dam was to be made of rock-fill, which provides greater seismic stability. Construction of the 315-foot (96 m) high San Gabriel Dam at this site began in 1932 and was completed in 1939.

In early 1938, before the dam was finished, Southern California was hit by record floods. The heaviest rains fell in the San Gabriel Mountains, swelling the San Gabriel River; on the night of March 2–3, 1938 a flood of 150,000 cu ft/s (4,200 m^{3}/s) poured out of the mountains and into San Gabriel Reservoir. San Gabriel Dam was able to knock about 40,000 cu ft/s (1,100 m^{3}/s) off the peak of the flood. Further downstream, Morris Reservoir was able to absorb roughly 30,000 cu ft/s (850 m^{3}/s), reducing the flood to less than half of what it would have been if not for the dams.

== Climate ==
Climate data for Camino, California
Month	Jan	Feb	Mar	Apr	May	Jun	Jul	Aug	Sep	Oct	Nov	Dec	Year
Mean daily maximum °F (°C)	64.3 (17.9)	64.4 (18.0)	67.0 (19.4)	71.0 (21.7)	74.8 (23.8)	81.5 (27.5)	89.0 (31.7)	90.3 (32.4)	87.6 (30.9)	78.9 (26.1)	70.4 (21.3)	63.9 (17.7)	75.3 (24.0)
Mean daily minimum °F (°C)	43.3 (6.3)	43.4 (6.3)	45.0 (7.2)	47.4 (8.6)	51.3 (10.7)	55.8 (13.2)	61.5 (16.4)	63.0 (17.2)	60.3 (15.7)	54.6 (12.6)	47.6 (8.7)	42.8 (6.0)	51.3 (10.7)
Average precipitation inches (mm)	6.55 (166)	5.81 (148)	4.49 (114)	1.89 (48)	0.74 (19)	0.14 (3.6)	0.03 (0.76)	0.23 (5.8)	0.45 (11)	1.00 (25)	2.52 (64)	4.11 (104)	27.96 (709.16)
Average snowfall inches (cm)	0.2 (0.51)	0.0 (0.0)	0.0 (0.0)	0.0 (0.0)	0.0 (0.0)	0.0 (0.0)	0.0 (0.0)	0.0 (0.0)	0.0 (0.0)	0.0 (0.0)	0.0 (0.0)	0.0 (0.0)	0.2 (0.51)
Source: Noaa

== Water management ==
Water stored behind San Gabriel Dam is an important source for groundwater recharge during the dry season of April through October. Water from San Gabriel, Cogswell and Morris Dams is released gradually through the dry months to spreading grounds at San Gabriel Canyon (Azusa) and Peck Basin (near Arcadia), where it percolates into the local groundwater basin. Dam operations are coordinated by the San Gabriel River Water Committee (Committee of Nine), established in 1889 to represent water-rights holders on the San Gabriel River and with rights to 97,700 acre-feet (120,500 dam^{3}) of river water; and the San Gabriel Valley Protective Association, which has rights to all water flows above 97,700 acre-feet as well as all storage space in San Gabriel, Cogswell and Morris Dams.

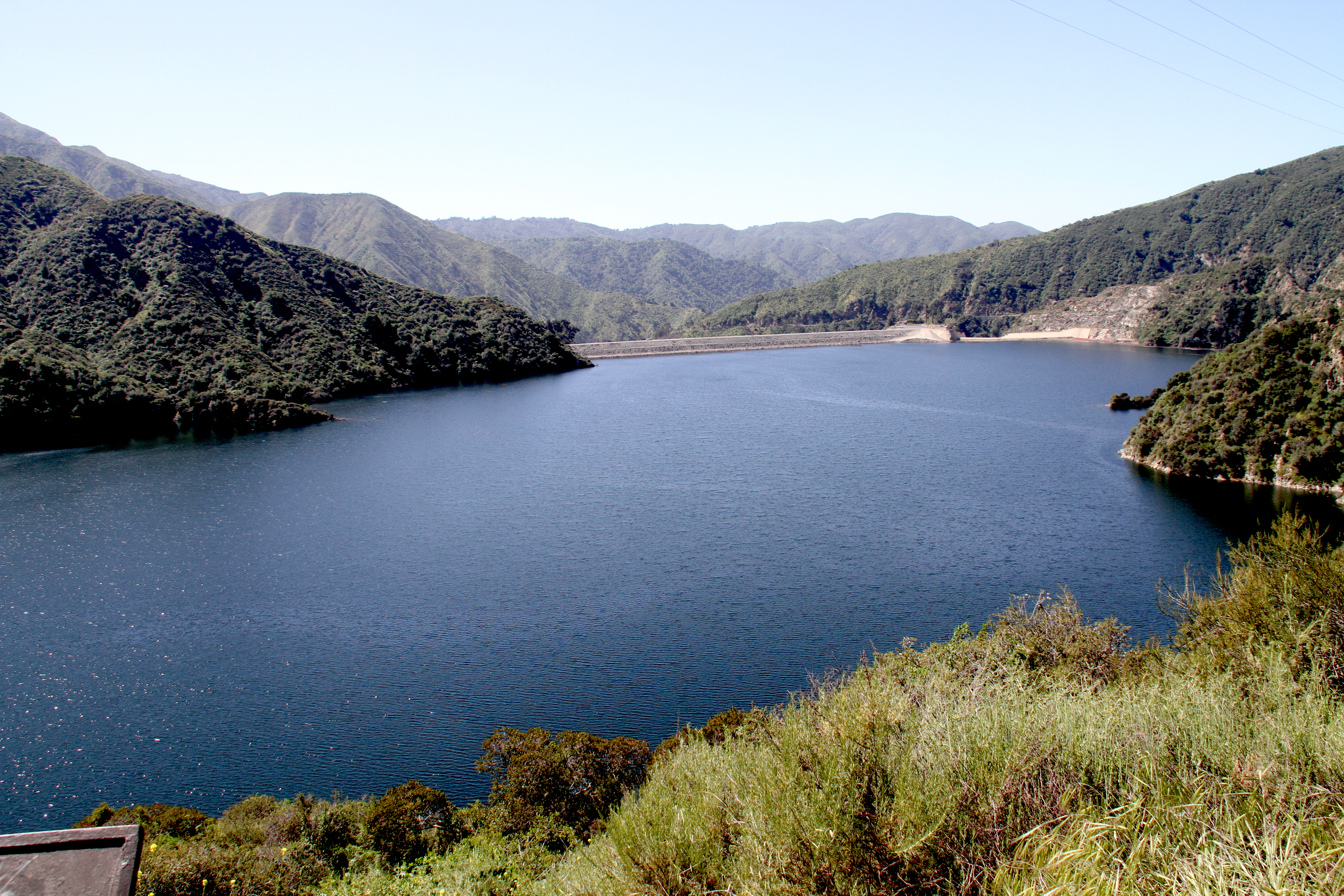
View of a nearly full reservoir in 2011 from the north, with the dam and spillway in the background

The large reservoir, known as San Gabriel Reservoir No. 1, is nearly 3 miles (4.8 km) long when full. The 525-acre (212 ha) reservoir stores 44,183 acre⋅ft (54,499,000 m^{3}) of water when full, creating one of Southern California's largest instream reservoirs. This is 17% less than the original capacity of 53,344 acre⋅ft (65,799,000 m^{3}) when the dam was first built, because sedimentation has reduced the water volume. Interest in sediment removal began in the 1980s, after several major wildfires in the San Gabriel Mountains and subsequent flooding caused millions of cubic yards of sediment to wash into the reservoir. The reservoir was dewatered in 2004 to allow for sediment removal, but work was delayed after heavy rains during the winter of 2004–2005 refilled the reservoir.

Disposal of the removed sediment has been a contentious issue. The 2005 sediment removal project stored about 6,100,000 cubic yards (4,700,000 m^{3}) of sediment in a nearby canyon, but this is now prohibited due to environmental and safety issues. Another option would have been to truck the sediment to local beaches for replenishment, but this has also been banned by the California Coastal Commission. Currently, most of the sediment is sold for building material or ends up as landfill, but these options are highly limited.

Flood control releases are coordinated in conjunction with the other mountain dams, Morris and Cogswell; and with Santa Fe and Whittier Narrows Dams on the lower San Gabriel River.

== Power plant ==
The dam supports two small hydroelectric plants producing a maximum of 4.95 MW and owned by the Department of Public Works. Water from the reservoir can be bypassed through a tunnel called the Azusa Conduit to another power plant downstream of Morris Dam. The power plant is located on the south side of the San Gabriel River directly below the mouth of San Gabriel Canyon. The original power plant was first built in 1898, by the San Gabriel Electric Company, and during its first few decades of operation powered electric railway lines in Los Angeles. At the time, this 2000 kilowatt (KW) plant drew water directly from the San Gabriel River. In 1917, the plant was sold to Southern California Edison, before being incorporated into the Pasadena municipal electric system. The completion of San Gabriel Dam in 1939 ensured a steadier water supply for the power plant, and in the late 1940s a new 3000 KW facility was built to replace the old one.

== Trivia ==
The dam appears in the 2001 action/war film Behind Enemy Lines and is set in southern Bosnia. The dam was also a location for the 1934 film Spitfire.

== See also ==
- List of dams and reservoirs in California
- List of lakes in California
- List of the tallest dams in the United States
