= Disappointment (disambiguation) =

Disappointment is the feeling of dissatisfaction that follows the failure of expectations to manifest.

Disappointment may also refer to:

- Camp Disappointment, the northernmost campsite of the Lewis and Clark expedition
- Disappointment Creek (Utukok River), a river in North Slope Borough, Alaska
- Disappointment Island, one of seven uninhabited islands of the archipelago Auckland Islands
- Disappointment Islands, a small group of coral atolls
- Disappointment Mountain, a peak in the Sawtooth Mountains, Minnesota
- Disappointment Peak (Wyoming), a peak in the Teton Range
- Mount Disappointment (California), a mountain in the San Gabriel Mountains
- Mount Disappointment (Australia) in Victoria, Australia
- "Disappointment", a song by The Cranberries from No Need to Argue
- Several lakes named "Disappointment Lake"

== See also ==
- Cape Disappointment (disambiguation)
- Disappointed (disambiguation)
- Great Disappointment
- The Disappointment, a ballad opera performed in 1762 written by an unknown author under the pseudonym "Andrew Barton"
- "The Disappointment" (Aphra Behn), a poem by Aphra Behn
