= West Fork Conservancy =

Non-profit in Los Angeles County, California

The West Fork Conservancy is a 501(c)(3) non-profit volunteer organization which collects, bags, and hauls trash and human waste out of the San Gabriel River located within the Angeles National Forest of the San Gabriel Mountains. The Conservancy also removes Graffiti, assists in extinguishing illegal camp fires and cooking fires, and performs whatever other tasks that the United States Forest Service requests of the organization.

The Forest Service provides the organization with annual safety training and safety oversight, assisting the Conservancy with some of the needed materials and equipment needed to collect, haul, and remove tonnes of garbage left within the West Fork canyon along the river, however the Conservancy volunteers themselves rely upon donations from the general public and upon the charitable purchasing of materials from their own members.

The Conservancy adds a "uniformed presence" which increases compliance for serious safety threats to the forest (such as agreeing to extinguish illegal ground fires and refraining from killing wildlife) by wearing the U. S. Forest Service volunteer uniform which assists to show the recreating public that the public lands remanded to the Forest Service for administration are being maintained despite a decade of extensive budget cuts

== History ==
The West Fork Conservancy was created in 2009 by local citizens who liked to do Fly fishing within the West Fork of the San Gabriel River and found a growing need for unpaid volunteers to lend a hand cleaning up and removing the increasing amounts of pollution and addressing other serious problems caused by over 22.6 million citizens who live within Southern California, over 1.6 million of which recreate in the Angeles National Forest.

== Education efforts ==
The West Fork Conservancy also provides children and adults with environmental education as part of the Conservancy's commitment to improving the health of the West Fork and for the health of the drinking water which deposits in to the San Gabriel Watershed which millions of citizens in Southern California rely upon for drinking, irrigation of farm lands, and for industry.

As part of the Conservancy's patrol along the West Fork of the San Gabriel River the organization engages the general public, discussing environmental issues, safety issues, in addition to assisting the recreating public when there are medical issues, Domestic violence, inebriation, and other safety problems that adversely impact individuals as well as impact the health and safety of the forest and its watershed.

== Contact information ==
West Fork Conservancy, 114 North Glendora Avenue, Suite 183, Glendora, California, 91741

== Related volunteer organizations ==
- Angeles National Forest Fire Lookout Association — Restoration and operation of fire lookout towers in the ANF
- Altadena Mountain Rescue Team — Saving lives through mountain rescue and safety education
- Sierra Madre Search & Rescue — A group of dedicated volunteers committed to saving lives in the wilderness
- San Gabriel Mountains Trailbuilders — California's elite hiking and nature trail repair group
- Angeles Volunteer Association — Organizes Visitor Center information, trail repair, and a broad spectrum of forestry efforts
- Fisheries Resource Volunteer Corps — works with the Forest Service, helping with various projects during the year
- San Dimas Mountain Rescue Team — Highly trained mountain rescue team
- Los Angeles County Sheriff's Air Rescue 5 — Volunteer Reserve Deputy Sheriffs are paid $1 a year for their work
