= Angeles National Forest =

National forest in California, United States

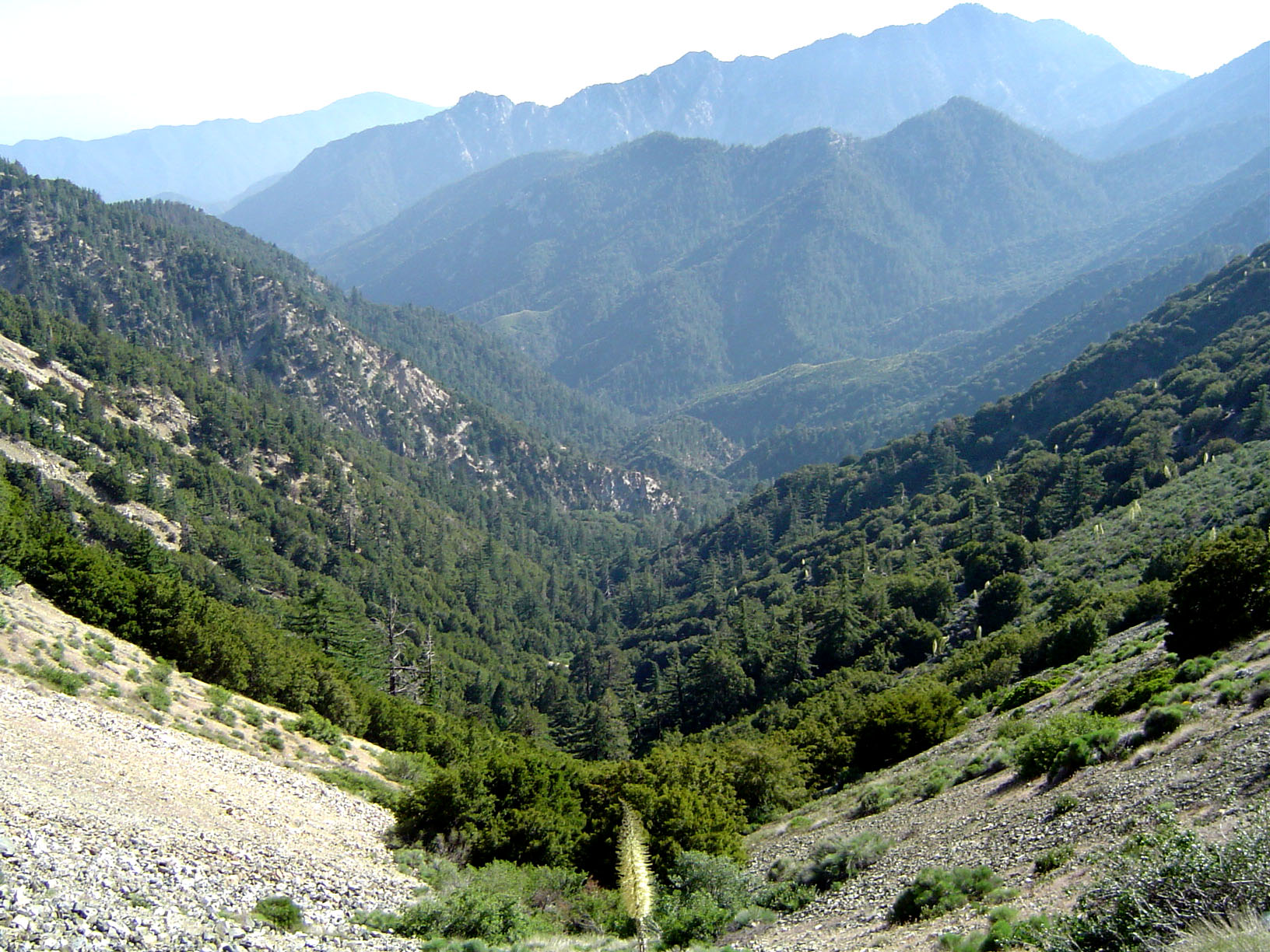
- The San Gabriel Mountains, part of the Angeles National Forest. The southwest view from Islip Saddle shows Bear Creek, a tributary of the San Gabriel River that lies within the San Gabriel Wilderness, and Twin Peaks (7,761 feet (2,366 m)).
- Interactive map of Angeles National Forest
- Location: Los Angeles, San Bernardino, and Ventura counties in California, United States
- Nearest city: Los Angeles
- Coordinates: 34°20′N 118°08′W
- Area: 655,387 acres (2,652.26 km^{2})
- Established: July 1, 1908
- Governing body: U.S. Forest Service
- Website: fs.usda.gov/angeles

California Historical Landmark
- Reference no.: 717

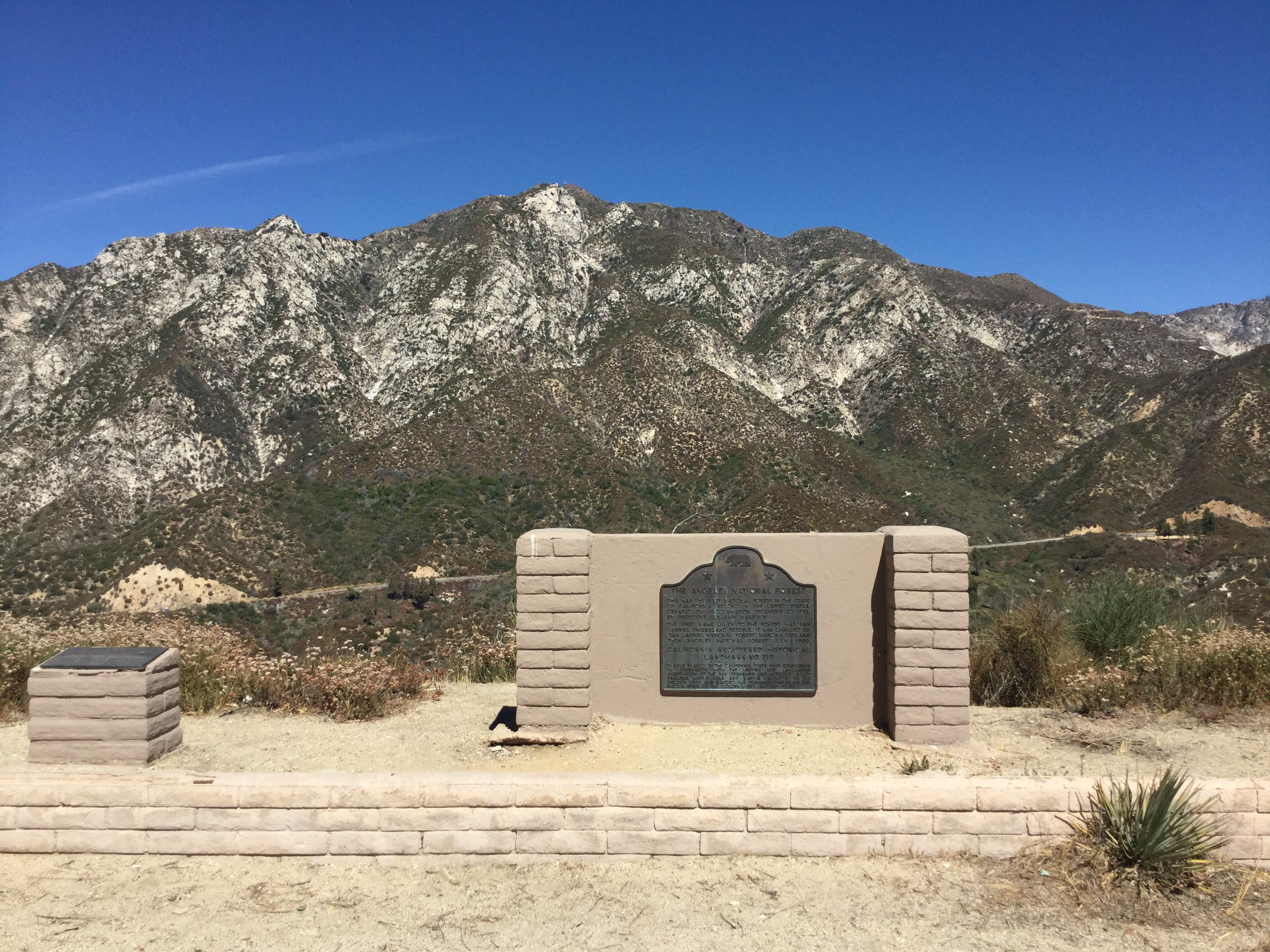
Monument detailing the history of the Angeles National Forest

The Angeles National Forest (ANF) of the United States Forest Service is located in the San Gabriel Mountains and Sierra Pelona Mountains, primarily within Los Angeles County in Southern California. The ANF manages a majority of the San Gabriel Mountains National Monument.

The national forest was established in 1908, incorporating the first San Bernardino National Forest and parts of the former Santa Barbara and San Gabriel National Forests. Angeles National Forest headquarters are located in Arcadia, California.

== Geography ==
The Angeles National Forest covers a total of 700,176 acres (1,094.0 sq mi; 2,833.5 km^{2}), protecting large areas of the San Gabriel Mountains and Sierra Pelona Mountains. It is located just north of the densely inhabited metropolitan area of Greater Los Angeles.

While primarily within Los Angeles County, a small part extends eastward into southwestern San Bernardino County, in the Mount San Antonio ("Mount Baldy") area, and a tiny section also extends westward into northeastern Ventura County, in the Lake Piru area.

The San Gabriel Mountains National Monument, established in 2014 and managed by the U.S. Forest Service, is largely within the Angeles National Forest.

The John D. Dingell Jr. Conservation, Management, and Recreation Act of 2019 established the Saint Francis Dam Disaster National Memorial and Saint Francis Dam Disaster National Monument at and around the ruins of the St. Francis Dam in the Forest's San Francisquito Canyon.

=== Wilderness areas ===
The Angeles National Forest contains five nationally designated wilderness areas. Two of these also extend into neighboring San Bernardino National Forest:

- Cucamonga Wilderness — mostly in San Bernardino National Forest
- Magic Mountain Wilderness
- Pleasant View Ridge Wilderness
- San Gabriel Wilderness
- Sheep Mountain Wilderness — partially in San Bernardino National Forest

=== Climate ===
Climate data for Angeles National Forest (at San Gabriel Canyon)
Month	Jan	Feb	Mar	Apr	May	Jun	Jul	Aug	Sep	Oct	Nov	Dec	Year
Mean daily maximum °F (°C)	68.5 (20.3)	69.1 (20.6)	70.0 (21.1)	73.3 (22.9)	77.9 (25.5)	84.0 (28.9)	91.5 (33.1)	91.7 (33.2)	87.5 (30.8)	80.9 (27.2)	75.5 (24.2)	68.5 (20.3)	78.2 (25.7)
Mean daily minimum °F (°C)	47.2 (8.4)	47.3 (8.5)	47.8 (8.8)	49.7 (9.8)	53.1 (11.7)	55.8 (13.2)	58.7 (14.8)	59.9 (15.5)	58.7 (14.8)	55.1 (12.8)	52.7 (11.5)	47.9 (8.8)	52.8 (11.6)
Average precipitation inches (mm)	4.40 (112)	5.06 (129)	3.50 (89)	1.69 (43)	0.62 (16)	0.19 (4.8)	0.04 (1.0)	0.11 (2.8)	0.39 (9.9)	0.86 (22)	1.92 (49)	3.49 (89)	22.28 (566)

Climate data for Angeles National Forest (at Lake Hughes)
Month	Jan	Feb	Mar	Apr	May	Jun	Jul	Aug	Sep	Oct	Nov	Dec	Year
Mean daily maximum °F (°C)	51 (11)	55 (13)	59 (15)	64 (18)	71 (22)	80 (27)	89 (32)	89 (32)	84 (29)	73 (23)	60 (16)	53 (12)	68 (20)
Mean daily minimum °F (°C)	35 (2)	37 (3)	39 (4)	44 (7)	50 (10)	59 (15)	66 (19)	66 (19)	60 (16)	51 (11)	41 (5)	35 (2)	48 (9)
Average precipitation inches (mm)	4.20 (107)	1.30 (33)	3.11 (79)	0.80 (20)	0.18 (4.6)	0 (0)	0.01 (0.25)	0.03 (0.76)	0.15 (3.8)	0.26 (6.6)	1.81 (46)	2.48 (63)	14.32 (364)
Average snowfall inches (cm)	0 (0)	0.5 (1.3)	0.1 (0.25)	0 (0)	0 (0)	0 (0)	0 (0)	0 (0)	0 (0)	0 (0)	0 (0)	1.5 (3.8)	2.1 (5.3)

Climate data for Angeles National Forest (at Mt. Baldy Notch)
Month	Jan	Feb	Mar	Apr	May	Jun	Jul	Aug	Sep	Oct	Nov	Dec	Year
Record high °F (°C)	68 (20)	64 (18)	63 (17)	73 (23)	76 (24)	88 (31)	85 (29)	95 (35)	89 (32)	78 (26)	74 (23)	60 (16)	95 (35)
Mean maximum °F (°C)	58.6 (14.8)	56.4 (13.6)	56.4 (13.6)	62.6 (17.0)	72.4 (22.4)	80.0 (26.7)	82.1 (27.8)	84.7 (29.3)	77.4 (25.2)	72.9 (22.7)	63.4 (17.4)	56.0 (13.3)	82.0 (27.8)
Mean daily maximum °F (°C)	42.7 (5.9)	42.3 (5.7)	41.7 (5.4)	48.0 (8.9)	59.1 (15.1)	67.7 (19.8)	75.3 (24.1)	77.4 (25.2)	68.1 (20.1)	59.8 (15.4)	48.3 (9.1)	42.2 (5.7)	56.0 (13.3)
Daily mean °F (°C)	34.5 (1.4)	34.1 (1.2)	33.4 (0.8)	38.7 (3.7)	48.2 (9.0)	55.5 (13.1)	64.2 (17.9)	65.0 (18.3)	57.1 (13.9)	50.1 (10.1)	39.6 (4.2)	34.2 (1.2)	46.2 (7.9)
Mean daily minimum °F (°C)	26.4 (−3.1)	25.7 (−3.5)	25.2 (−3.8)	29.4 (−1.4)	37.3 (2.9)	43.2 (6.2)	53.2 (11.8)	52.6 (11.4)	46.3 (7.9)	40.2 (4.6)	30.9 (−0.6)	26.0 (−3.3)	36.4 (2.4)
Mean minimum °F (°C)	7.8 (−13.4)	13.6 (−10.2)	11.9 (−11.2)	15.0 (−9.4)	20.8 (−6.2)	27.3 (−2.6)	46.1 (7.8)	42.3 (5.7)	35.3 (1.8)	24.5 (−4.2)	13.1 (−10.5)	7.1 (−13.8)	2.8 (−16.2)
Record low °F (°C)	0 (−18)	5 (−15)	6 (−14)	6 (−14)	12 (−11)	20 (−7)	39 (4)	38 (3)	30 (−1)	7 (−14)	1 (−17)	−6 (−21)	−6 (−21)
Average precipitation inches (mm)	8.45 (215)	7.80 (198)	3.70 (94)	4.62 (117)	0.81 (21)	0.07 (1.8)	0.37 (9.4)	0.35 (8.9)	1.24 (31)	0.65 (17)	5.71 (145)	6.58 (167)	40.36 (1,025)
Average snowfall inches (cm)	11.9 (30)	20.5 (52)	29.5 (75)	44.6 (113)	3.2 (8.1)	0.3 (0.76)	0.0 (0.0)	0.0 (0.0)	0.5 (1.3)	0.9 (2.3)	6.3 (16)	13.5 (34)	131.3 (334)

== History ==
Early Native American cultural sites in the inland mountain regions corresponding with the Angeles National Forest are sparse, Radiocarbon dates of 7675 and 7600 years Before Present (BP), taken from a cooking feature in one of the northern drainages of the San Gabriel Mountains, are the oldest known from the central Transverse Ranges. Early material culture indicates extensive use of grinding implements to process small seeds, supplemented by hunting activities. Numerous cogged stones are also found within sites of this period, indicating ceremonial activities.

During the Middle Period (5000 BP to 800 BP), sites generally indicate an increase in population and broadening of the resource base in response to population pressure and resource stress. This period is represented by a large array of specialized subsistence sites, characterized as villages, base camps, food processing and procurement sites, special use sites, rockshelters, pictographs, ovens, and cemeteries.

A Late Period (800 BP to AD 1769) proliferation of sites within the Angeles National Forest indicates a marked increase in regional population. Village provinces, composed of politically and economically-aligned villages may have existed during this period. Subsistence efforts in the mountains appear to focus on hunting, marked by the appearance of the bow and arrow. Greater regional interaction is marked by an increase in non-local materials, indicative of widespread interregional trade networks.

The first reported European contact for the area of the Angeles was in 1769 when the expedition of Gaspar de Portola traveled through the neighboring valleys on his way to Monterey. Early non-Native American use of the Forest centered on early explorers traveling through the area, while early land grants, missions, and townsites surrounded the Forest area. The construction of the missions of San Gabriel Archangel (1771) and San Fernando Rey de España (1797) cemented Spanish presence in the region. In the first two decades of the 19th Century, the Mission System drew in large numbers of Indian neophytes for baptism, completely changing the cultural landscape of the area. A number of subordinate Missions, or Estancias, were built with native labor as outposts to serve as mission-affiliated ranchos, overseeing localized operations. The Spanish Missions generally occupied the lands in the lowlands but relied heavily on the mountains for water, building supplies, and game. By 1800, local Native American traditional cultural lifestyles of had largely disappeared due to devastating European influences, including diseases and incorporation into the Mission System.

The first documented instance of timber activity in the local mountains was in 1819 when Joseph Chapman cut down timber in Millard Canyon (also called Church Canyon) for use in the construction of the Plaza Church in El Pueblo de Nuestra Señora la Reina de los Angeles de Porciuncula (now just ‘Los Angeles’). It has also been said that timbers for the San Fernando Mission came from the Tujunga Canyons, and for the San Gabriel Mission came from Little Icehouse Canyon and Little Santa Anita Canyon.

With the Independence of Mexico in 1821, the area of the Forest came under Mexican control. The Mexican Period is typified by the secularization of the Mission system, and the appearance of large land grants, called Ranchos. The major activities involved livestock and farming, and peripheral areas were regularly involved in these activities, as vaqueros sought out timber, water, prey, sport, and stray cattle and horses. Use of the highlands may have included seasonal livestock grazing, utilizing some of the springs in the area.

It was during this period that gold was discovered in Placerita Canyon, in 1842, the first authenticated discovery of gold in California. It started California's "first" gold rush. Soon after the later discovery of gold at Sutter’s Mill in 1848, and subsequent conflict between the United States and Mexico, California became part of the United States. Almost immediately large numbers of American migrants began crossing the desert. Merchants and landowners settled in communities throughout the southern California region. Miners poured into the mountains primarily following original and modified Indian trails. Large placer and lode mining operations were established in the San Gabriels, with mixed success. Although the mountains were honeycombed with quartz veins, and a host of small mines were gouged out of the slopes in an attempt to strike gold, many of the ventures were inactive by 1896. The last flurries of serious mining in the region largely ended by the late 1930s. Building of major roads began in the 1850s and railroads passed through Soledad Canyon and Cajon Pass a short time later. Don Benito Wilson, in 1864, built a road into the Forest to harvest wood for fence posts, wine barrels, pickets and shingles. With the majority of Forest composed of chaparral, timber has not played a large role on the Forest, with commercial timber activities virtually ceasing in the Forest during the mid-1950s.

The Great Hiking Era of the San Gabriel Mountains (AD 1880 – 1938) saw increasing use of the rugged backcountry for recreational purposes by the foothill communities, coinciding with the real estate boom in the lowlands and the great interest in hiking, hunting and fishing by the urban populations. In particular, six major hiking trails converged at Red Box Saddle. Settlements started inside the Forest boundaries in the forms of homesteads and resorts in the southern section, and, in the less steep northern section, ranches and homesteads. In 1891, the first homestead was filed in the Big Tujunga Canyon area, and others soon followed. Homestead patents were established throughout the range, with the last being granted on the Angeles National Forest in 1938. A number of resorts and camps sprang up, and these supported the increasing numbers of hikers and campers who forged into the wilderness. In 1889, the first telescope made its arduous journey up to the summit of Mt. Wilson. A small observatory of canvas and wood, run by Harvard and USC astronomers, was later replaced in 1904 by the more famous institution run by George Ellery Hale. Mount Wilson Observatory would quickly rise to dominate astronomy worldwide. It was home to the world's two largest telescopes as well as the most powerful facilities in existence for studying the sun.

In 1891, preliminary work began on an electric cable incline railway from Rubio Canyon to Echo Mountain, a feat never before attempted in the world. Professor Thaddeus S. C. Lowe, an energetic entrepreneur who had garnered fame in the Civil War by ballooning for the Union Army, undertook the venture. In its height at the turn of the century, the Mount Lowe Railway was the most popular tourist attraction in California, comparable to a modern-day Disneyland. In its 43 year history, it saw over three million recorded visitors. In 1938, the most destructive rainstorm in recent memory washed away so much of the track that the railway was abandoned. Much of the ruins of the Mt Lowe Railway are still accessible above Pasadena for interpretive hikes.

On December 20, 1892, the San Gabriel Timberland Reserve was created by President Harrison. The creation of the Reserve, which was the forerunner of the Angeles, was in response to public concern about watershed values as early as 1883. Floods resulting from fire denuded slopes were causing problems with the lowland populations. In 1905, the Reserves were transferred from the Department of the Interior to the Department of Agriculture, and renamed National Forest in 1907. The San Gabriel National Forest consisted of the southern section of the present day Angeles and portions of the San Bernardino Forest. In 1908, the name was changed to Angeles National Forest. In 1926, the eastern area was divided and San Bernardino National Forest recreated. At this time, the Saugus (now part of the Santa Clara-Mojave Rivers Ranger District) was detached from the Santa Barbara Reserve and joined with the Angeles.

The San Gabriel Forest Reserve was established on December 20, 1892, the San Bernardino Forest Reserve was established on February 25, 1893, and the Santa Barbara Forest Reserve was established on December 22, 1903. Together, they became National Forests on March 4, 1907, and they were combined on July 1, 1908, with all of the San Bernardino forest and portions of San Gabriel forest and Santa Barbara forest composing the new Angeles National Forest. In 1916, there was a movement to create the Sierra Madre National Park, but that never occurred.

On September 30, 1925, portions of the Angeles National Forest and the Cleveland National Forest were detached to re-establish the San Bernardino National Forest.

Angeles National Forest is registered as California Historical Landmark #717, for being the first National Forest in the state.

The campgrounds at Broken Blade, Twisted Arrow and Pima Loops were closed on July 26, 2013, after squirrel infected with bubonic plague was discovered.

=== Wildfires ===
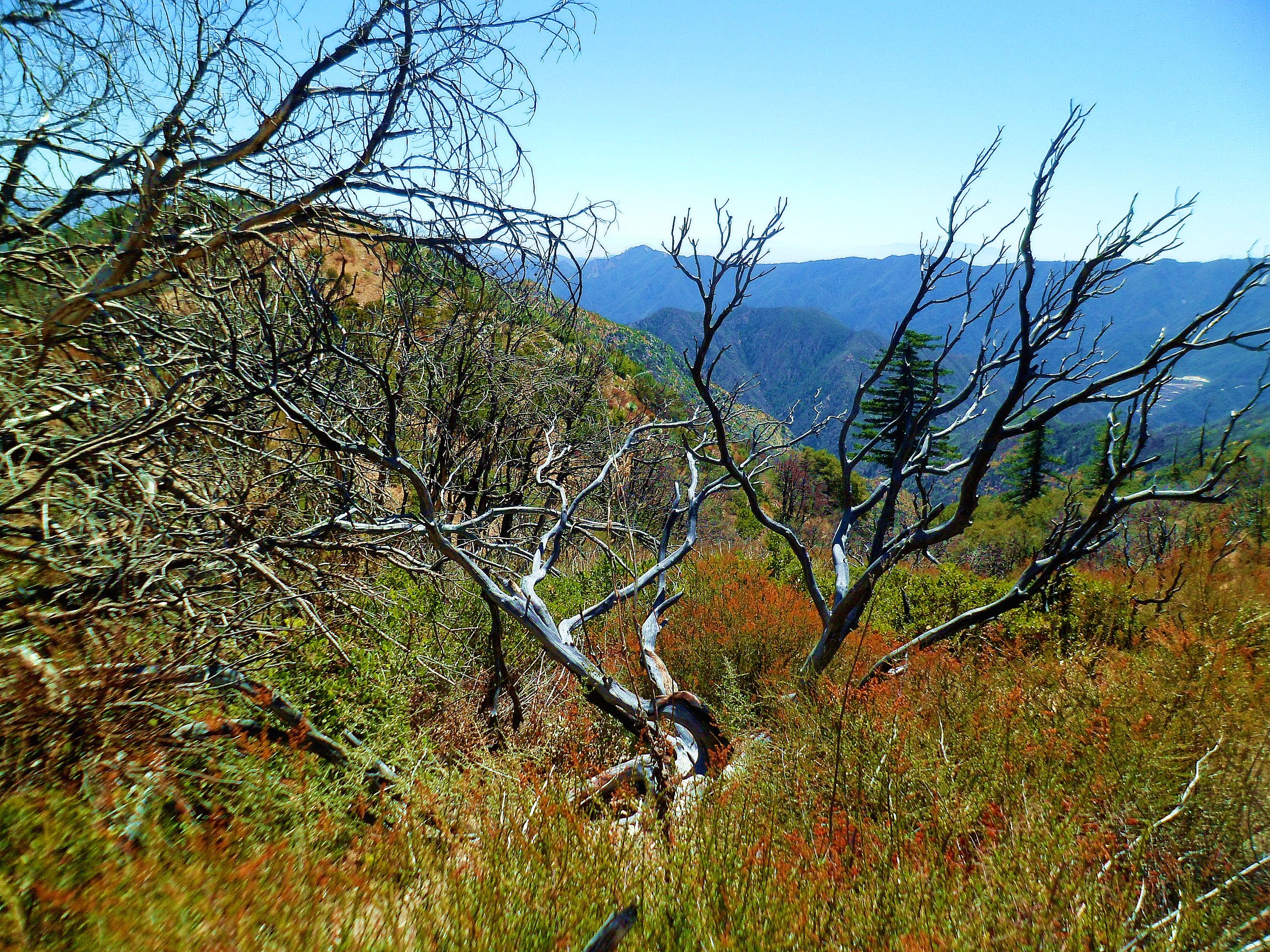
2014, new growth emerges after the fires of 2012

==== Loop Fire (1966) ====
On November 1, 1966, a fire started at 5:19 a.m. on the Los Pinetos Nike Site (LA-94). The fire spread, threatening medical facilities and residential areas south edge of the national forest. 12 firefighters with United States Forest Service's El Cariso "Hot Shot" crew were killed when they were caught in a flare up in a canyon. 11 more firefighters were seriously burned in the incident. The fire was brought under control at 1:00 p.m. on November 2, having burned 2,028 acres (8.21 km^{2}).

==== Station Fire (2009) ====
In the Station Fire, more than 161,000 acres (650 km^{2}) of the forest were burned by an arson fire that began on August 26, 2009, near Angeles Crest Highway in La Cañada and quickly spread, fueled by dry brush that had not burned for over 150 years. The fire burned for more than a month and was the worst in Los Angeles County history, charring 250 square miles (650 km^{2}), approximately one-fourth of the forest; displacing wildlife, and destroying 91 homes, cabins and outbuildings and the family-owned Hidden Springs Cafe.

During the fire, two firefighters died after driving off the Mt. Gleason County Road looking for an alternate route to get the inmates out at Camp 16. The Station Fire threatened the Mount Wilson Observatory atop Mt. Wilson . The site includes two telescopes, two solar towers, and transmitters for 22 television stations, several FM radio stations, and police and fire department emergency channels. Although the fire scorched one side of the outhouse at amateur-owned Stony Ridge Observatory, six miles northeast of Mt. Wilson, aside from minor damage from smoke and ash infiltration, the remainder of the observatory and its historic 30-inch Carroll telescope survived.

==== Bobcat Fire (2020) ====
In September and October 2020, the Bobcat Fire burned 115,796 acres (180.931 sq mi) (468 km^{2}) in the central San Gabriel Mountains of the Angeles National Forest. It was one of the largest wildfires in Los Angeles County history.

==== Bridge Fire (2024) ====
On September 8, 2024, the Bridge Fire broke out near East Fork and Glendora Mountain roads in the Angeles National Forest. It quickly burned through much of the eastern portion of the forest and the Sheep Mountain Wilderness. On September 10, it crossed into San Bernardino County after seeing rapid growth. Evacuation orders were prompted for Mount Baldy Village and Wrightwood as the fire approached the communities. By the time it was contained, the fire burned a total of 56,030 acres (22,675 ha; 88 sq mi; 227 km^{2}) and destroyed 81 structures. The fire caused the Angeles National Forest to order closures for a large area of the forest in and around the burned area until December 31, 2024.

== Natural history ==
The Angeles National Forest manages the habitats, flora and fauna ecosystems, and watersheds. Some of the rivers with watersheds within its boundaries provide valuable non-groundwater recharge water for Southern California. The existing protected and restored native vegetation absorb and slow surface runoff of rainwater to minimize severe floods and landslides in adjacent communities. The land within the forest is diverse, both in appearance and terrain. Elevations range from 1,200 to 10,064 ft (366 to 3,068 m). The Pacific Crest Trail crosses the forest.

=== Flora ===
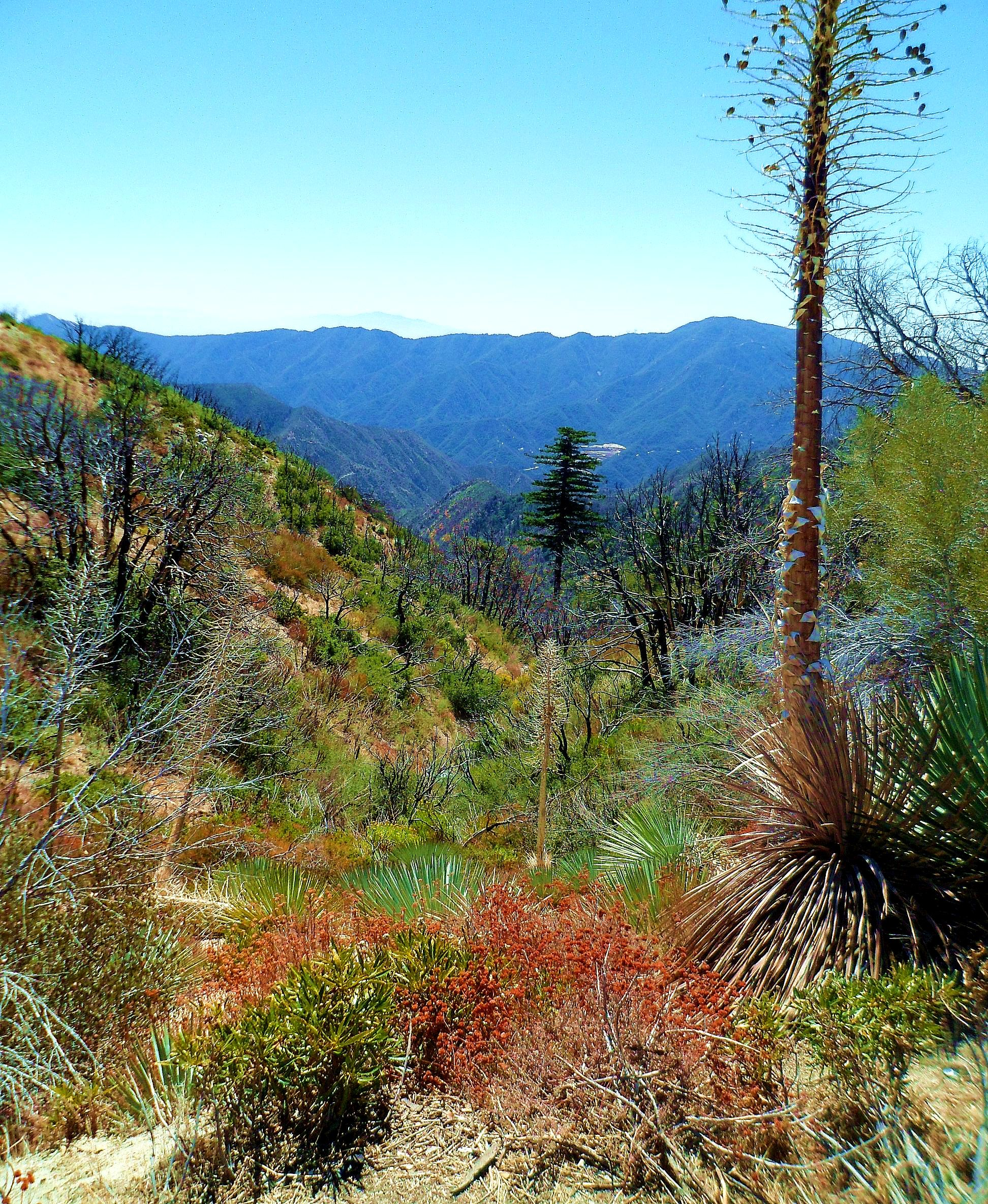
Various mountain plant life with the Chaparral yucca at right.

Much of this National Forest is covered with dense chaparral shrub forests with oak woodlands, which changes to pine and fir-covered slopes in the higher elevations. Subsequent to the fire there was a heavy growth of poodle-dog bush, apparently triggered by the fire's effect on dormant seeds, that lasted for several years. The plant produces prolific lavender flowers. Unfortunately, as visitors to the Forest discovered, contact with it may cause a poison-oak-like rash.

Tree species for which the forest is important include bigcone Douglas-fir (Pseudotsuga macrocarpa), Coulter pine (Pinus coulteri), and California walnut (Juglans californica). The National Forest also contains some 29,000 acres (12,000 ha) of old growth, with Jeffrey pine (Pinus jeffreyi) forests, as well as mixed conifer forests (with Bigcone Douglas-fir (Pseudotsuga macrocarpa), ponderosa pine (Pinus ponderosa), white fir (Abies concolor), and lodgepole pine (Pinus contorta) being the most abundant trees).

=== Fauna ===
This forest is home to black bears, gray foxes, bobcats, mountain lions, mule deer, bighorn sheep, rattlesnakes and coyotes.

== Access ==
A National Forest Adventure Pass is required for parking at many locations in the Angeles National Forest and other National Forests in Southern California, and this can be obtained online or from visitor centers and local merchants. Los Angeles County has declared that passes are not required on county-maintained roads. There are also many other areas that do not require the pass.

== General information ==
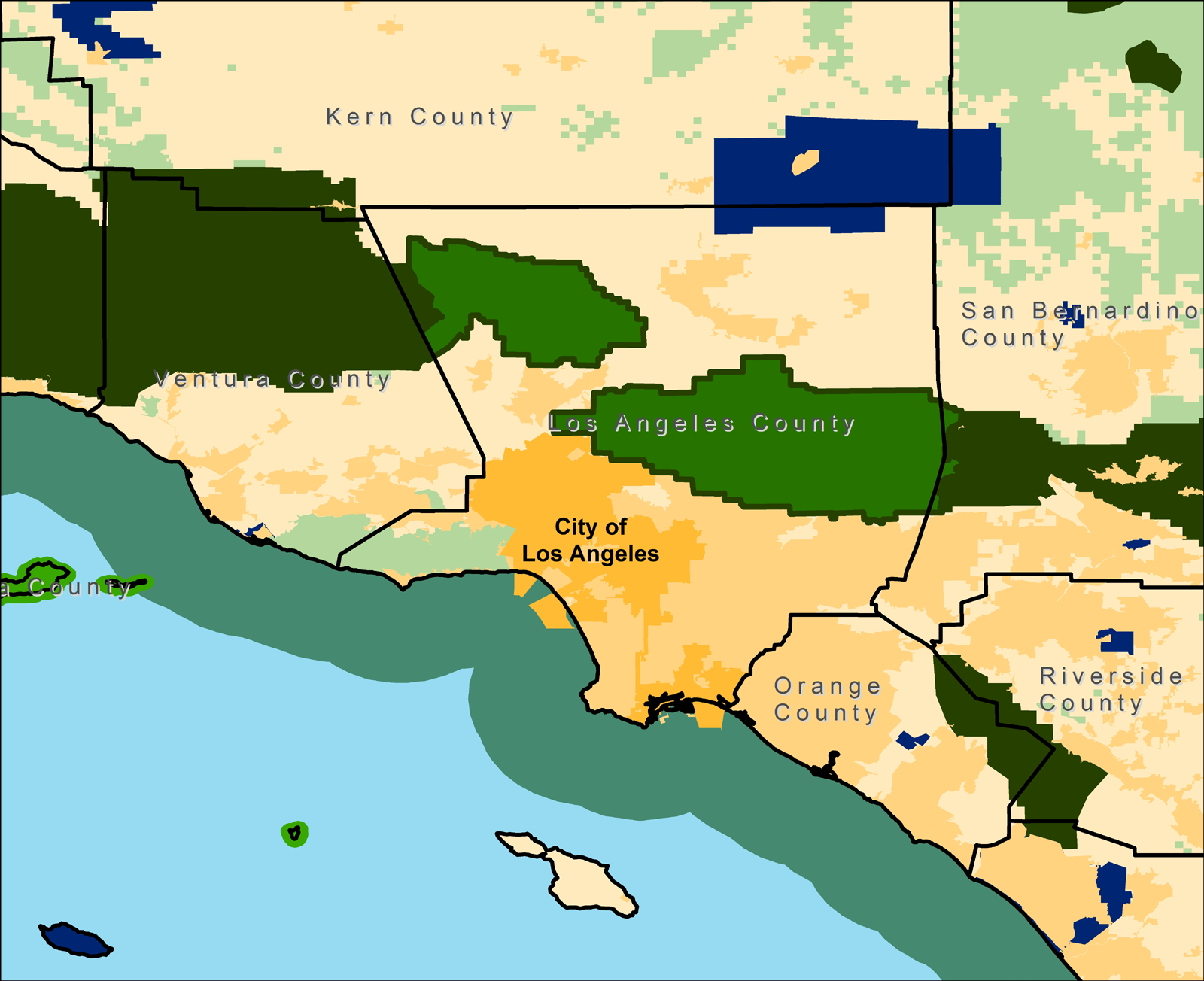
Angeles National Forest, the two green areas north of Los Angeles.

- Acres of land: 700,176 (2652 km^{2})
- Wilderness areas acres: 80,284 (324.9 km^{2})
- Miles of roads: 1,032 (1661 km)
- Visitor centers: 4
- Information centers: 4
- Fire lookout towers: 2
- Recreational residences: 505
- Picnic areas: 36
- Campgrounds: 66
- Ski areas: 2
- Entrance stations: 2

=== Ranger Districts ===
- Los Angeles Gateway Ranger District
  - Station: San Fernando, California
- San Gabriel Mountains National Monument
  - Station: Glendora, California

=== Trails ===
- Trailheads: 53
- Trail miles: 697 (1122 km)
- Off highway vehicle areas: 3
- Off highway vehicle route miles: 261 (420 km)

=== Natural features ===
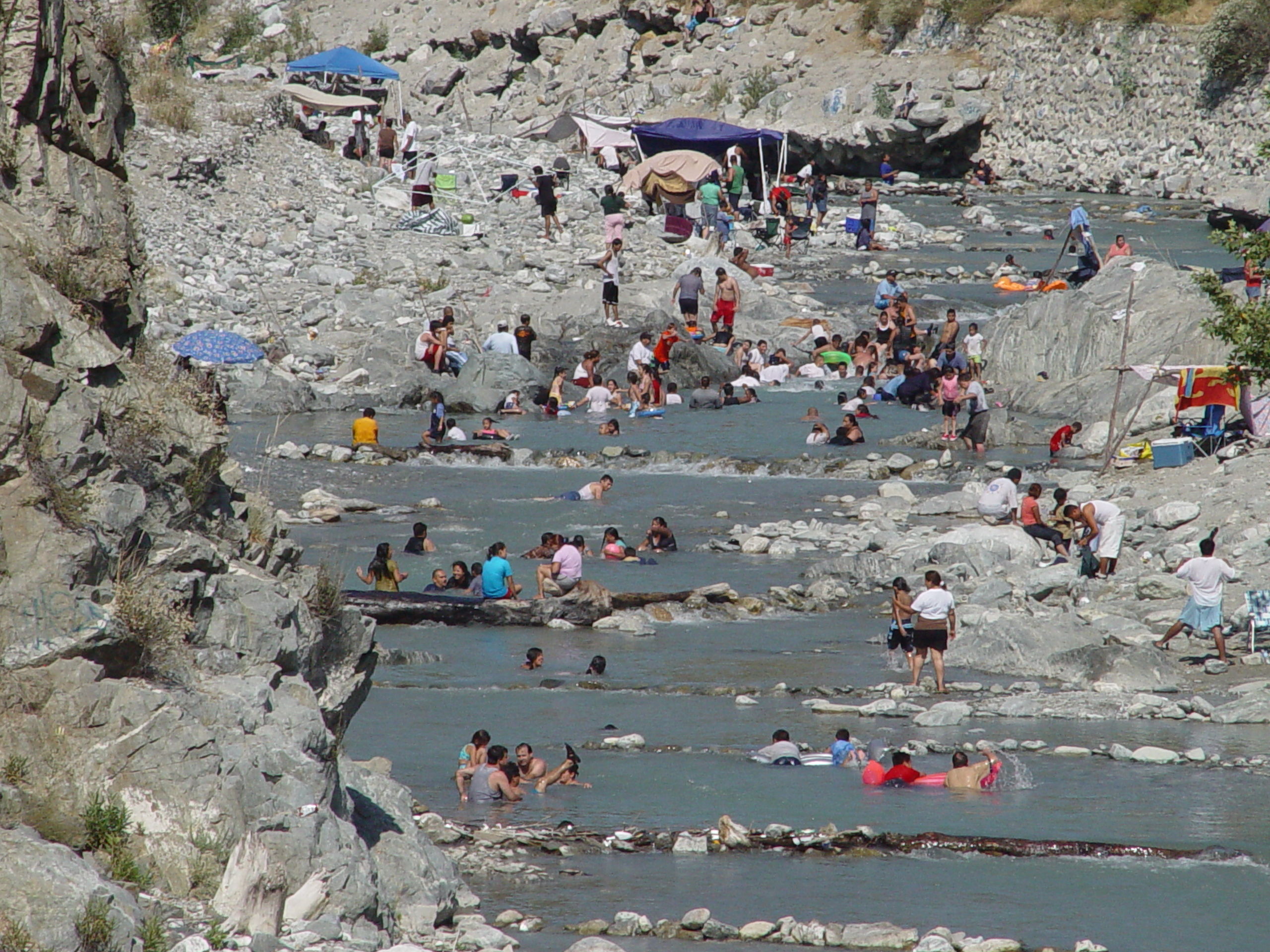
The east fork of the San Gabriel River is one of the most visited sites in the forest system.

- Wilderness areas: 5
- Lakes and reservoirs: 10
- Rivers and stream miles: 240

=== Sensitive species ===
- Sensitive plants: 22
- Sensitive wildlife: 23
- Threatened & endangered species: 16

=== Mountain peaks ===
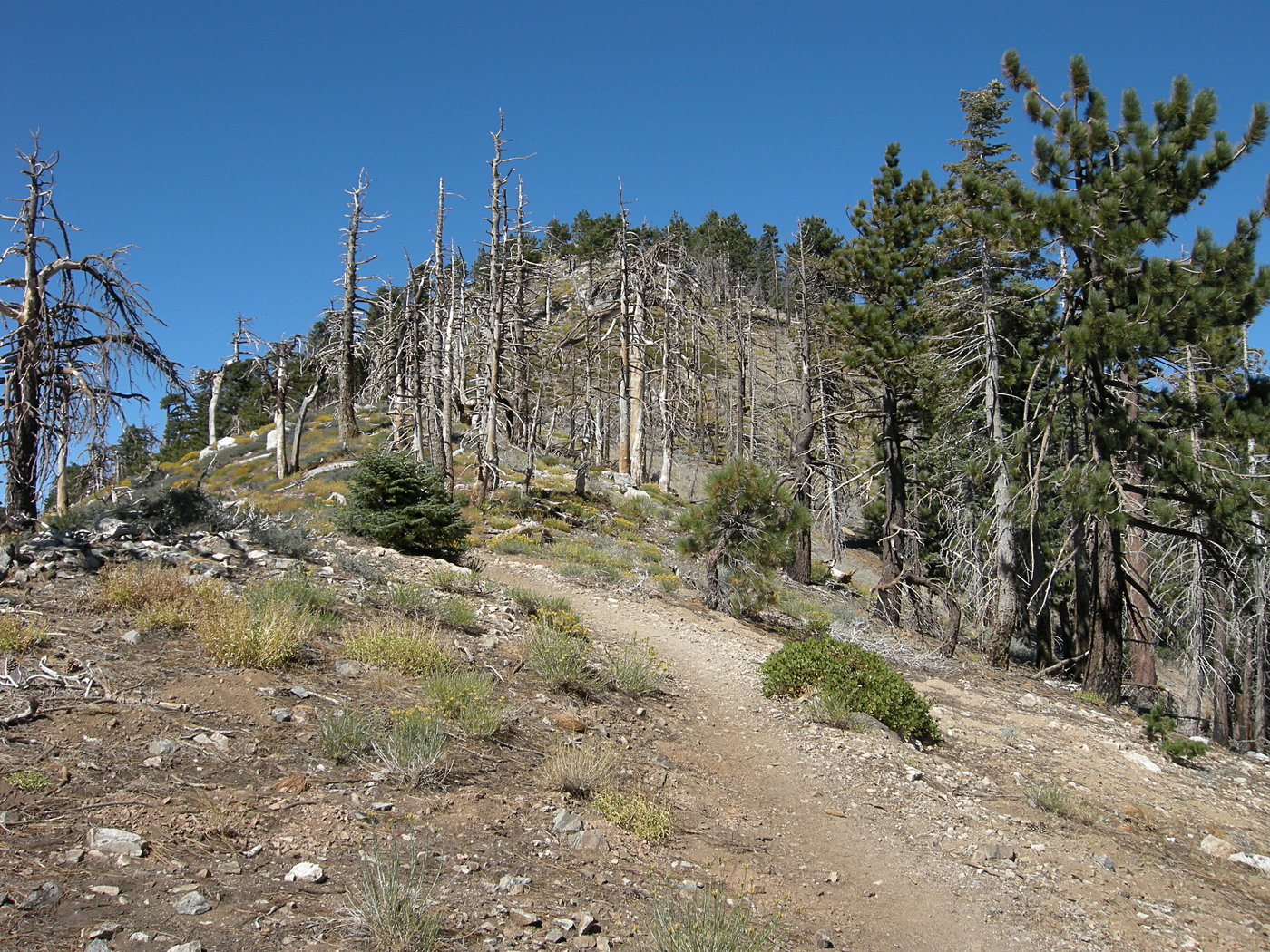
Mount Islip.

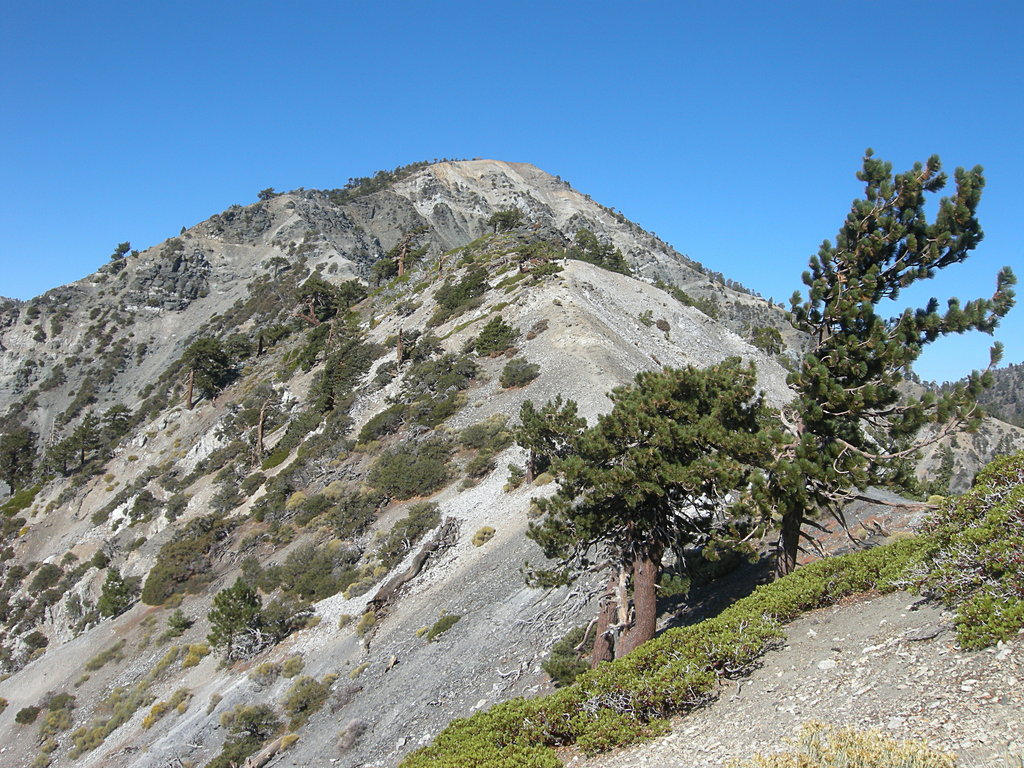
Mount Harwood, from Devils Backbone

Mountains within the Angeles National Forest include:

- Mount San Antonio 10,064 ft (3,068 m) — also known as "Mt. Baldy"
- Pine Mountain 9,648 ft (2,941 m)
- Dawson Peak 9,575 ft (2,918 m)
- Mount Harwood 9,556 ft (2,913 m)
- Mount Baden-Powell 9,407 ft (2,867 m)
- Throop Peak 9,142 ft (2,786 m)
- Mount Burnham 9,001 ft (2,744 m)
- Telegraph Peak (California) 8,989 ft (2,740 m)
- Mount Islip 8,250 ft (2,510 m) — site of historic Mt. Islip fire lookout tower
- Waterman Mountain 8,041 ft (2,451 m)
- Iron Mountain (Los Angeles County) 8,010 ft (2,440 m)
- South Mount Hawkins 7,783 ft (2,372 m) Lookout destroyed in Curve Fire 2002
- Mount Gleason 6,502 ft (1,982 meters)
- San Gabriel Peak 6,164 ft (1,879 m)
- Mount Disappointment (California) 5,963 ft (1,818 m)
- Vetter Mountain 5,911 ft (1,802 m) — site of historic Vetter Mountain fire lookout tower
- Burnt Peak 5,791 ft (1,765 m)
- Liebre Mountain 5,788 ft (1,764 m)
- Mount Wilson 5,710 ft (1,740 m) — location of the Mount Wilson Observatory
- Iron Mountain 5,636 ft (1,718 m)
- Mount Lowe (California) 5,606 ft (1,709 m)
- Josephine Peak 5,558 ft (1,694 m)
- Sawmill Mountain 5,515 ft (1,681 m)
- Condor Peak 5,459 ft (1,664 m)
- Sawtooth Mountain 5,200 ft (1,600 m)
- Mount Lukens 5,074 ft (1,547 m)
- Mount McKinley 4,925 ft (1,501 m)
- Magic Mountain (California) 4,864 ft (1,483 m)
- Mendenhall Peak 4,649 ft (1,417 m)
- Grass Mountain 4,606 ft (1,404 m)
- Redrock Mountain 4,488 ft (1,368 m)
- Warm Springs Mountain 4,019 ft (1,225 m)
- Kagel Mountain 3,537 ft (1,078 m)
- Echo Mountain 3,210 ft (980 m)
- Pacifico Mountain 7,124 ft (2,171 m)
- Bare Mountain 6,388 ft (1,947 m)
- Mount Hillyer 6,200 ft (1,890 m)
- Winston Peak 7,502 ft (2,287 m)
- Pallett Mountain 7,779 ft (2,371 m)
- Hoyt Mountain 4,416 ft (1,346 m)
- Wright Mountain 8,505 ft (2,592 m)
- Mount Markham 5,742 ft (1,750 m)
- Akawie Peak 7,283 ft (2,220 m)

All the above mountains are part of the San Gabriel Mountains, except for Burnt Peak, Liebre Mountain, Sawmill Mountain, Sawtooth Mountain, Grass Mountain, Redrock Mountain and Warm Springs Mountain, which are all in the Sierra Pelona Mountains.

=== Water recreation ===
- Pyramid Lake is located next to Interstate 5 (take Smokey Bear exit), 20 miles (32 km) north of Magic Mountain Amusement Park in Valencia, California.
- Castaic Lake is located 7 miles (11 km) north of Magic Mountain Amusement Park in Valencia, California, just off Interstate 5 (take Lake Hughes exit.) The lake is managed by the L.A. County Department of Parks and Recreation
- Elizabeth Lake is located approximately 10 miles (16 km) west of Palmdale, California, on Elizabeth Lake Rd. It can completely dry up in drought years.
- Crystal Lake is a small natural lake located near the northern end of Highway 39.
- Jackson Lake is another natural lake located on the San Andreas Fault about 3 miles (4.8 km) west of the Big Pines Visitor Center and roughly 7 miles (11 km) west of the community of Wrightwood, California.

== Volunteer organizations ==
- Angeles National Forest Fire Lookout Association: Restoration and operation of fire lookout towers in the ANF
- Altadena Mountain Rescue Team: Saving lives through mountain rescue and safety education
- Concerned Off-Road Bicyclists Association: Restoration and maintenance of multi-use trails in the ANF
- Sierra Madre Search & Rescue: A group of dedicated volunteers committed to saving lives in the wilderness
- San Gabriel Mountains Trailbuilders: California's hiking and nature trail repair group
- West Fork Conservancy: Maintains the West Fork of the San Gabriel River and Beer Creek
- Angeles Volunteer Association: Organizes Visitor Center information, trail repair, and a broad spectrum of forestry efforts
- Fisheries Resource Volunteer Corps: works with the Forest Service, helping with various projects during the year
- San Dimas Mountain Rescue Team: Highly trained mountain rescue team http://www.savetheeastfork.org/
- Los Angeles County Sheriff's Air Rescue 5: Volunteer Reserve Deputy Sheriffs are paid $1 a year for their work
- Save The East Fork Association: Works along the East Fork of the San Gabriel River
- Helping Our Mountain Environment: HOME—Glendora Mountain Road (GMR) trash and spray paint cleaning
- Lowelifes Trail Crew: Lowelifes focuses on trail work in Southern California's Angeles National Forest, fostering conservation, sustainability, & community in Los Angeles County.
- The Volunteers of the Angeles National Forest (VANF) are the representatives of USFS at Big Pines Visitor Center, located 3 miles west of the town of Wrightwood. The Visitor Center supplies information, directions and education to the public by staffing the center on weekends, providing handouts, and displaying preserved local forest animals, birds, and reptiles.

== Gallery ==
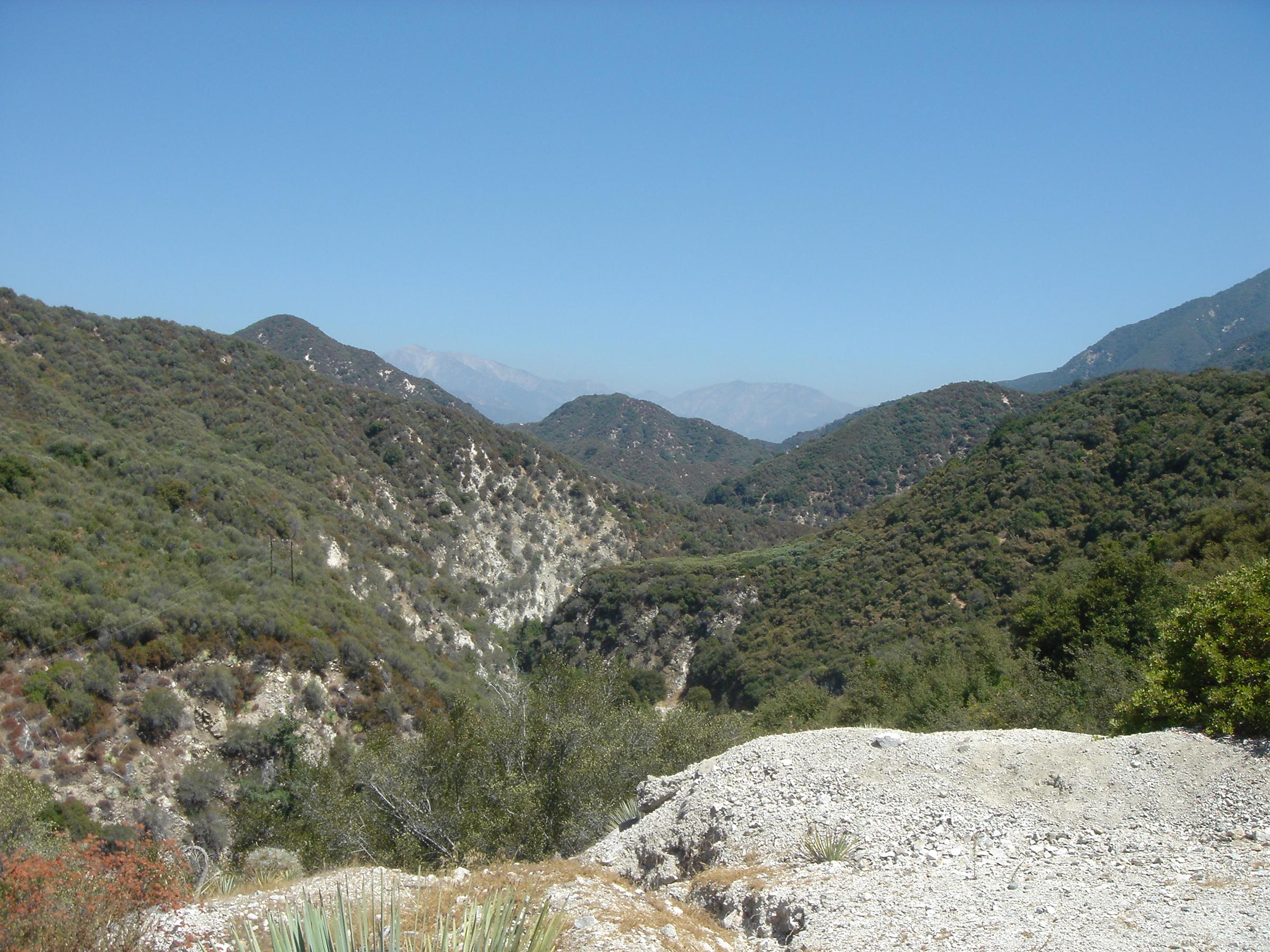
San Gabriel Mountains

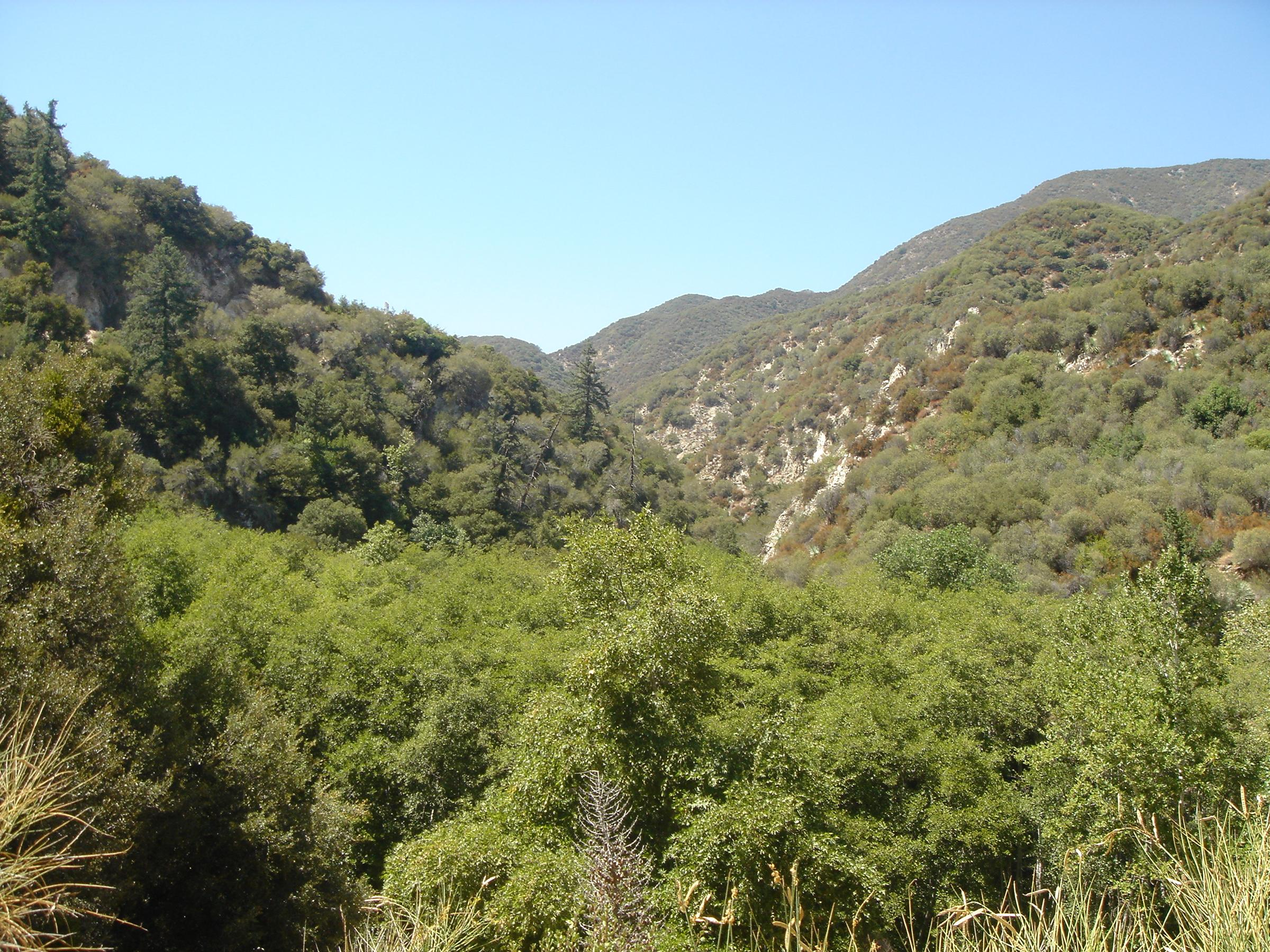
San Gabriel Canyon

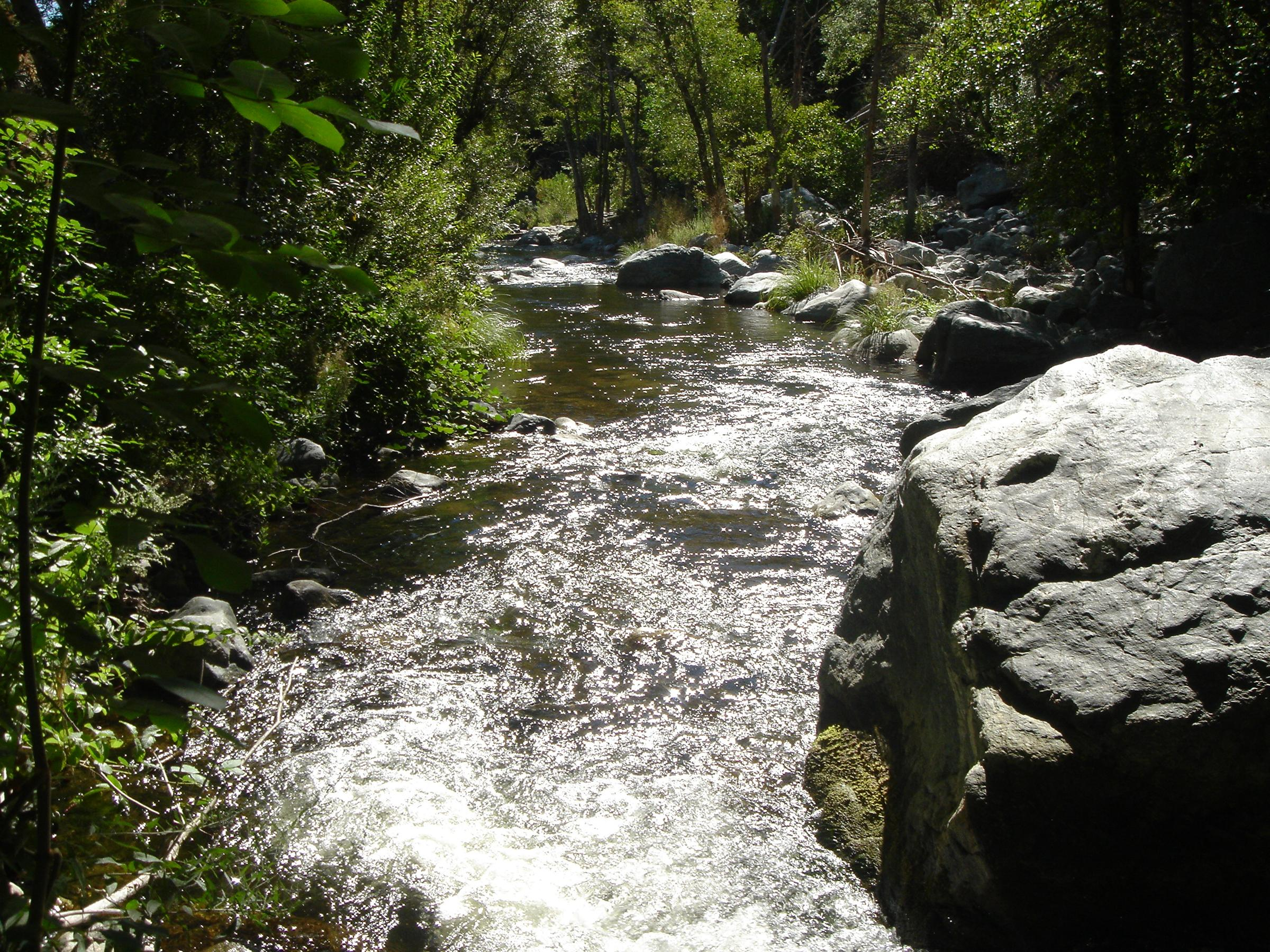
San Gabriel River

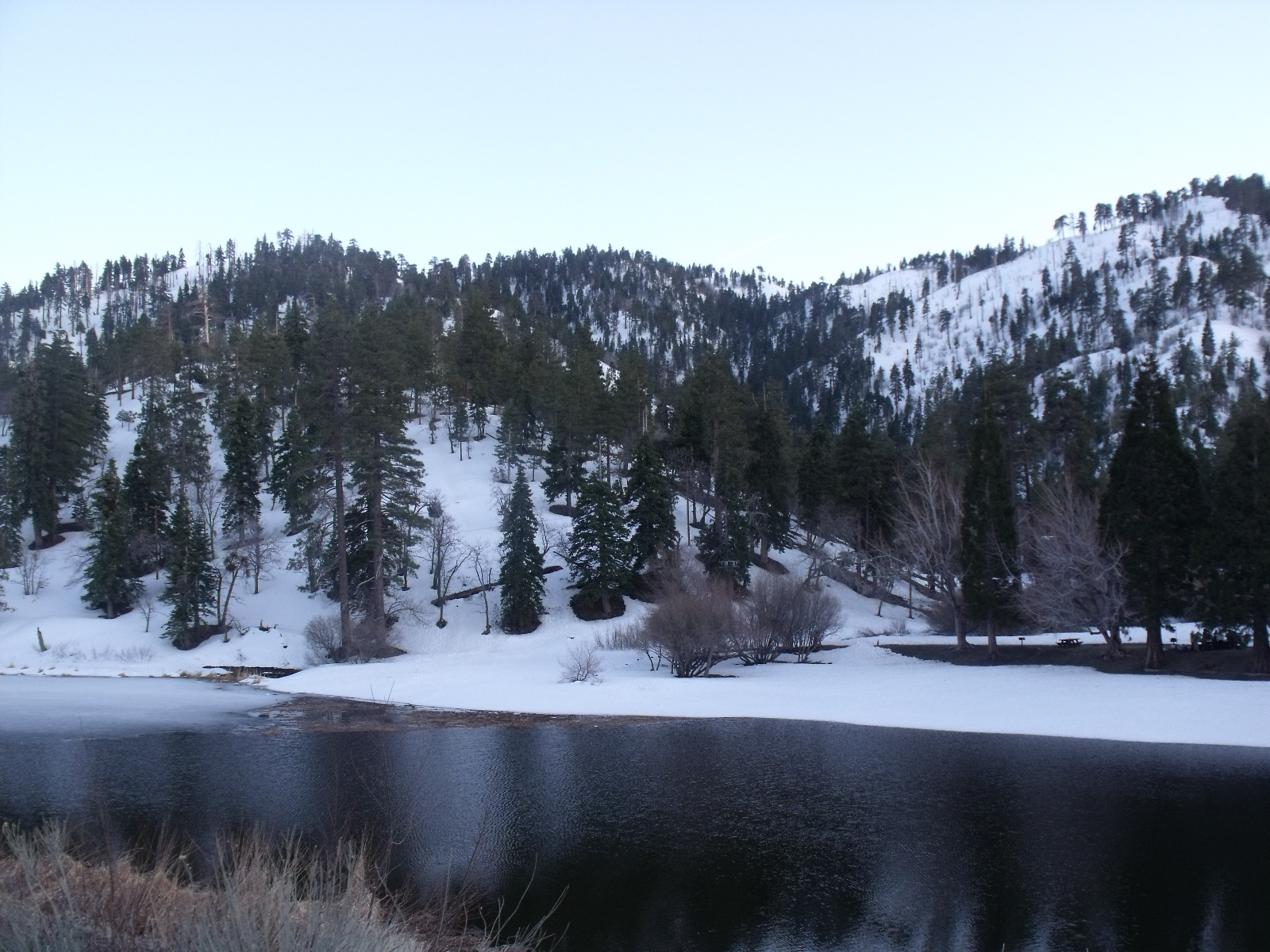
Jackson Lake

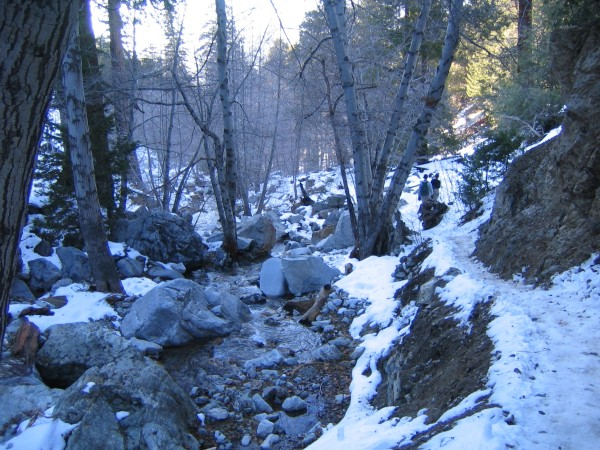
Along the Icehouse Canyon Trail

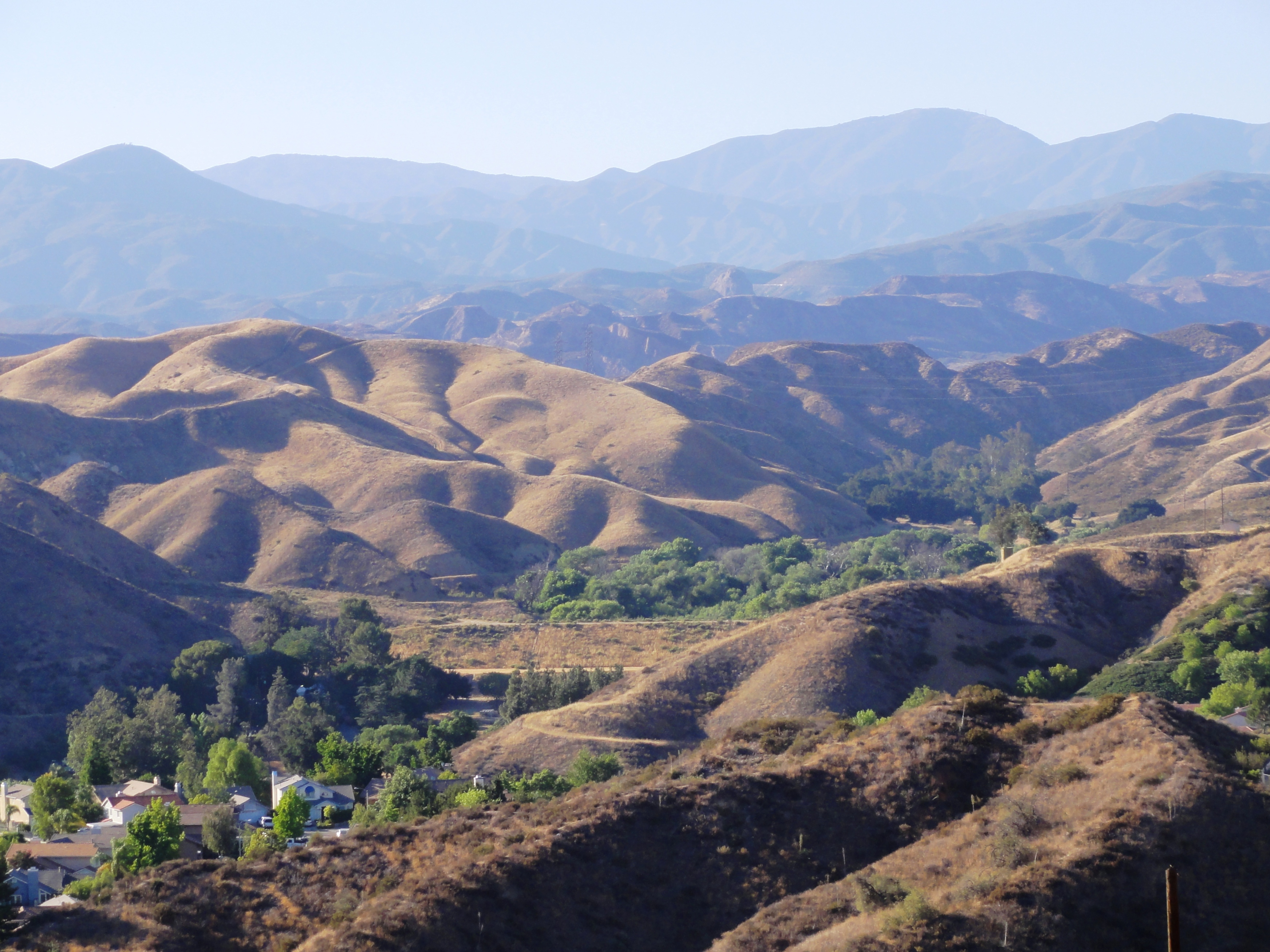
Sierra Pelona Mountains

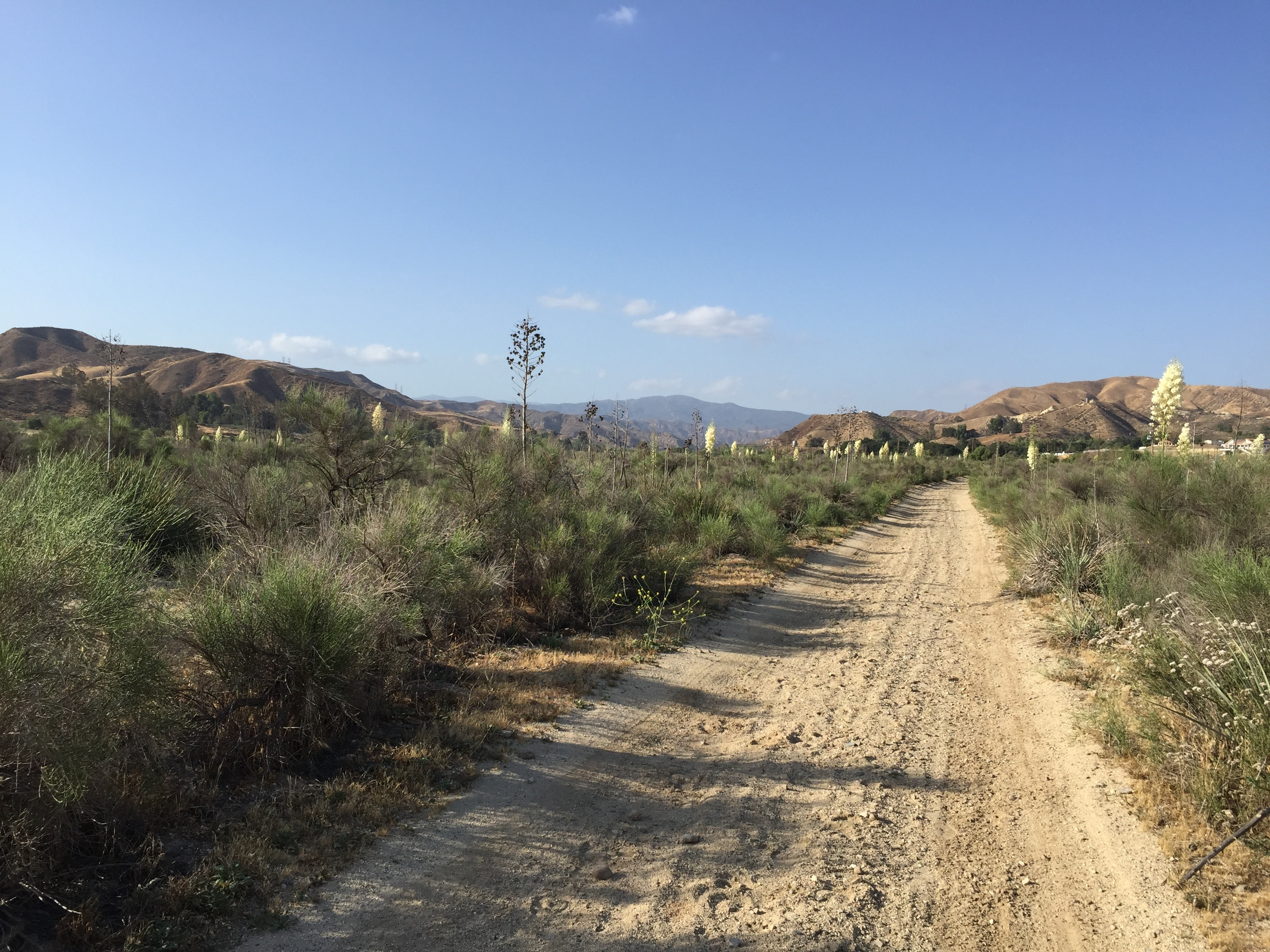
San Francisquito Canyon

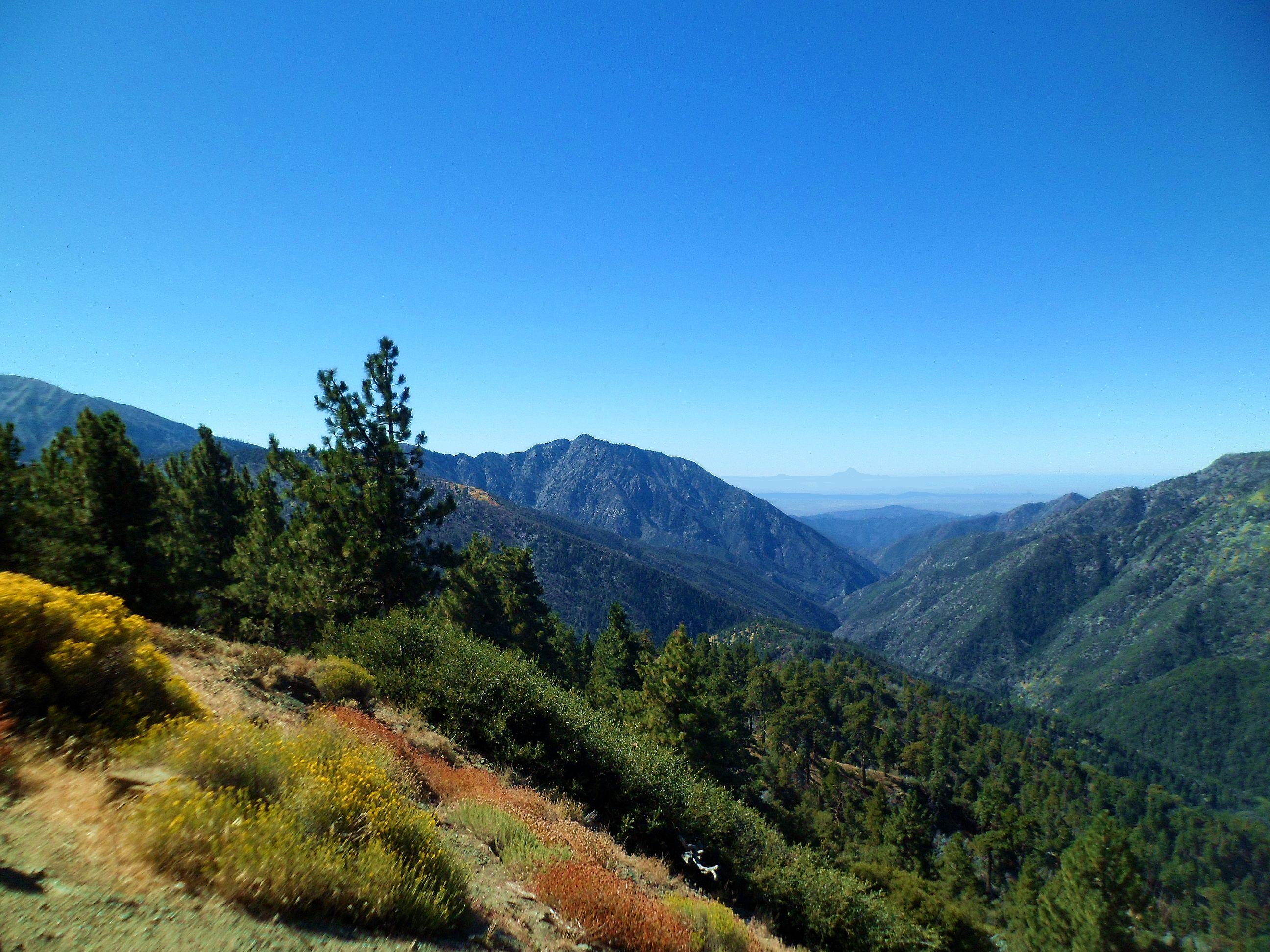
View west from Angeles Crest Highway

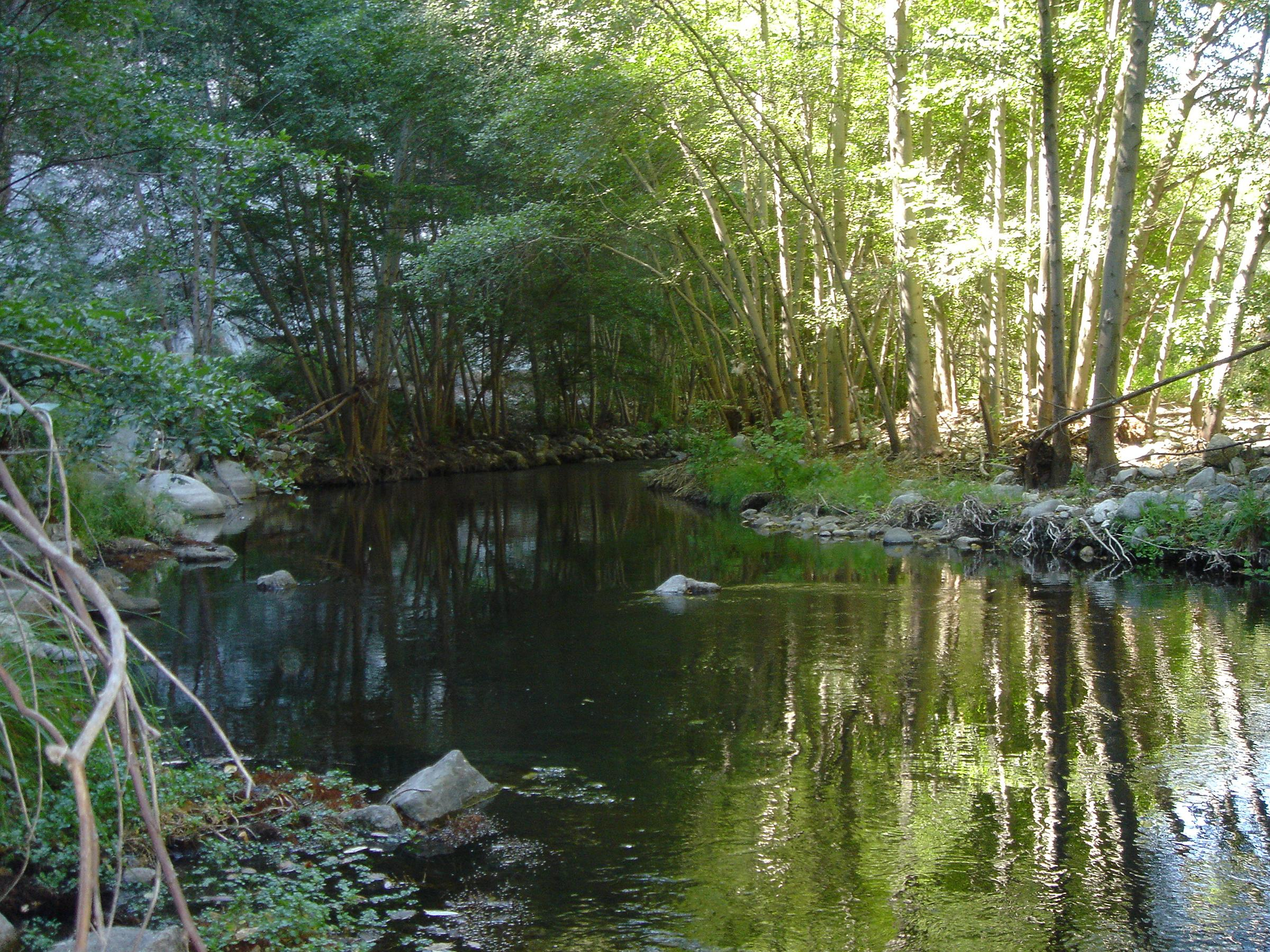
Riparian zone habitat.

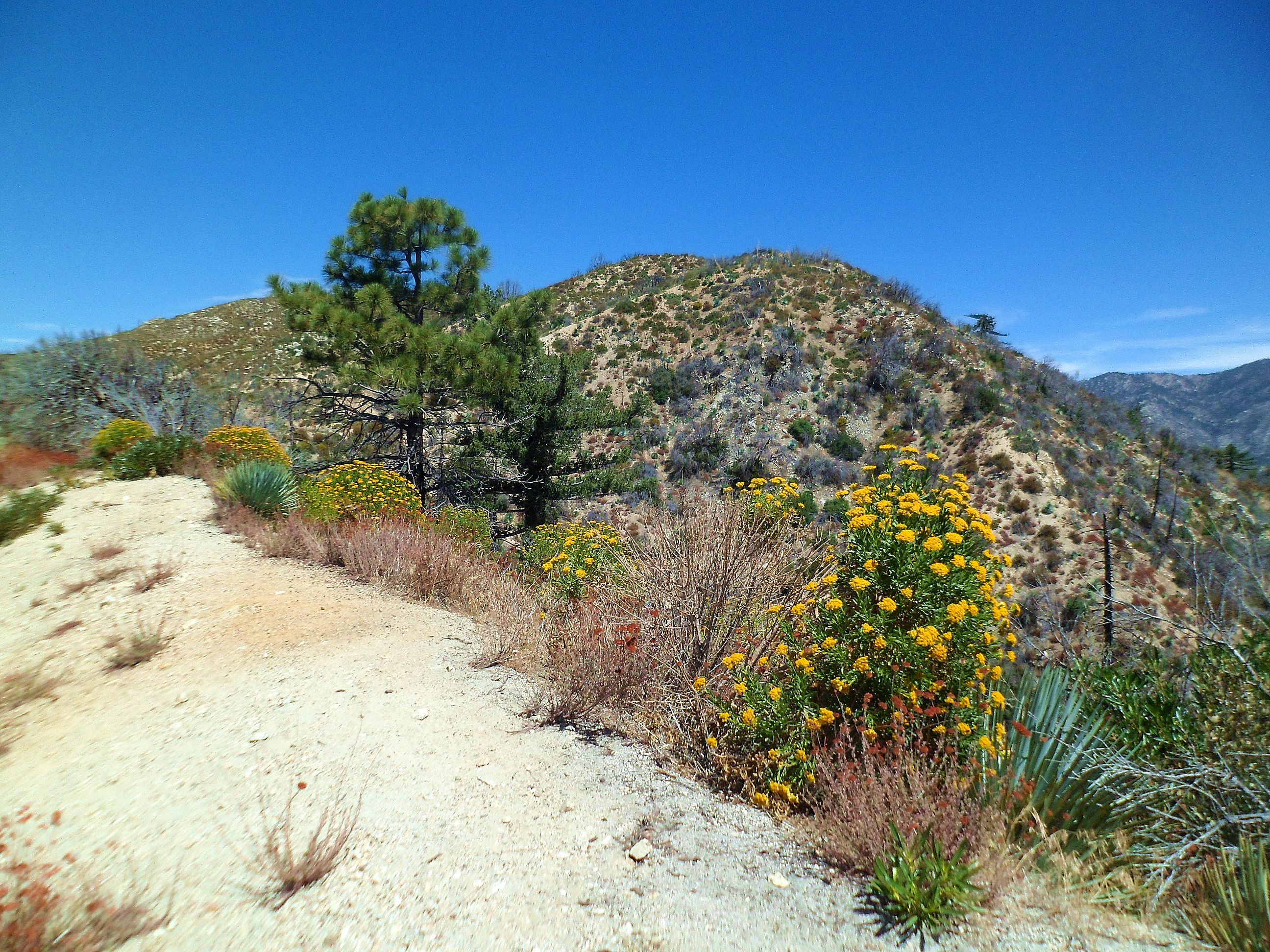
Montane chaparral ecotone with the Mojave Desert. Yellow sulphurflower buckwheat flowers in foreground.

== California Historical Landmark ==
The California Historical Landmark Marker NO. 717 at San Gabriel Mountain, Clear Creek vista point, State Hwy 2, 8.3 mi N of I-210, La Canada reads:

- NO. 717 THE ANGELES NATIONAL FOREST - The first national forest in the State of California and second in the United States, Angeles National Forest was created by proclamation of President Benjamin Harrison on December 20, 1892. The first name given to the forest, "'San Gabriel Timberland Reserve," was changed to "San Gabriel National Forest" March 4, 1907, and then to "Angeles National Forest" on July 1, 1908..

== See also ==
- List of national forests of the United States
- San Gabriel Mountains−related topics
- San Gabriel Mountains National Monument−related topics
- Henninger Flats
- Los Padres National Forest—adjacent to the northwest
- San Bernardino National Forest—adjacent the east
