= San Gabriel Mountains Trailbuilders =

Volunteer organization for trail maintenance

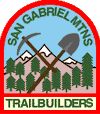
San Gabriel Mountains Trailbuilders Logo

The San Gabriel Mountains Trailbuilders (SGMTBs) is a 501(c)(3) non-profit volunteer organization which performs hiking and nature trail building and maintenance within the Los Angeles Gateway District of the United States Forest Service which maintains the Angeles National Forest within the San Gabriel Mountains.

The organization works closely with the United States Forest Service from which the Trailbuilders volunteers get their safety oversight and general schedule for tasks and projects which are performed during the year.

== Responsibilities ==
Hikers, bikers, climbers, fishers, backpackers, and other people who get their recreation within the Angeles National Forest may email the Trailbuilders when there are significant problems on trails which have not yet been identified and repaired. Such problems include dead trees down across the trail, significant erosion and washouts, excessive plant growth along the trail, or sections of trail which have otherwise disappeared or are difficult to locate.

Additionally the Trailbuilders are increasingly responsible for establishing and maintaining trail signs within the San Gabriel River Ranger District, identifying missing or damaged signs and replacing them as funds and schedule permits.

The Trailbuilders are responsible for all of the hiking and nature trails within the Crystal Lake Recreation Area, Coldbrook Campgrounds, Bear Creek Trail (mile post 32.4 along California State Route 39), East Fork Trail, Heaton Flats Trail (at the end of East Fork Road), and numerous other hiking and nature trails within the San Gabriel River Ranger District.

Additionally the organization is responsible for some of the trail maintenance within the Mount San Antonio (also known as Mount Baldy) area.

The organization invites High Schools, Colleges, Youth Groups, and other organizations to send volunteers to assist with trail projects during the year. Community service projects for students, Boy Scouts of America volunteers, and Eagle Scout Service Project candidates may contact the Trailbuilders to acquire information on how to participate in the trail-working efforts.

== Inventory of trails maintained ==
Some of the hiking and nature trails which the volunteer group is responsible for include the following, however there are numerous other trails which the group maintains that are accessed from the East Fork of the San Gabriel River that are not part of this list:

- Half Knob Trail : 34°19′26″N 117°50′12″W —This is a short hike trail which begins and ends at points along the main paved roadway leading to the Visitor Center. The trailhead is located at North 34 degrees, 19.444 by West 117 degrees, 50.210 at 5,717 feet (1,743 m).
- Lake Trail : 34°19′24″N 117°50′15″W —The trail cuts across the camp grounds and joins the main road that heads up to the Visit Center to Lake Road. The start of the trail head from the main road end is located at North 34 degrees, 19.410 by West 117 degrees, 50.261 at 5,744 feet (1,751 m).
- Golden Cup Nature Trail : 34°19′38″N 117°50′06″W —This is a short hike with four or five information boards placed along the trail. The trail itself forms a loop such that the start and end of the hike is near a main paved road. The trail head is located at North 34 degrees, 19.630 by West 117 degrees, 50.108 at 5,865 feet (1,788 m).
- Big Cieneca Trail : 34°20′07″N 117°49′31″W —This trail is 1.2 miles (1.9 km) long and has its start at a paved road.
- Windy Gap : 34°19′37″N 117°49′56″W —This trail is 2.5 miles (4.0 km) long and has its start at a paved road. The trailhead is located at North 34 degrees, 19.890 by West 117 degrees, 50.021 at 6,099 feet (1,859 m).
- Access to Pacific Crest Trail : 34°19′52″N 117°49′59″W —This trail is 2.5 miles (4.0 km) long and has its start at a paved road.
- Little Jimmy Trail Camp : 34°20′51″N 117°49′47″W —This trail is 2.8 miles (4.5 km) long and has its start at a paved road.
- Mount Hawkins Trail : 34°20′02″N 117°50′11″W —This trail is 4.8 miles (7.7 km) long and has its start at a paved road. The trail actually swings around the camp grounds and passes through a heliport (above the destroyed fire watch tower) and then ends at South Mt. Hawkins lookout (which burned to the ground in the 2002 Curve Fire.)
- Pinyon Ridge : 34°19′21″N 117°49′58″W —This is a moderately long trail which forms a loop that takes hikers up the side of the mountain ridge, along the ridge, and then back down again, curving around to form the loop. There is water present at three places along the trail all year, and the start of the trail requires about an hour's worth of effort to remove new growth. The trail head location is the same as the start of Soldier Creek: North 34 degrees, 19.354 by West 117 degrees, 49.976 at 5,656 feet (1,724 m).
- Soldier Creek Trail : 34°19′21″N 117°49′58″W —Fire damage and flooding has effectively destroyed this trail and it is currently extremely dangerous to hike along. This is a long hiking trail and without a doubt the best hiking trail in the Crystal Lake Recreation Area. It follows Soldier Creek which contains good, high-volume water, sporting rare vegetation such as Catalina Cherries. This trail may or may not be restored prior to the Crystal Lake Camp Grounds being opened. The trail head location is the same as the start of Pinyon Ridge trail: North 34 degrees, 19.354 by West 117 degrees, 49.976 at 5,656 feet (1,724 m).
- Lost Ridge Trail : 34°19′27″N 117°50′34″W (lower) : 34°19′27″N 117°50′22″W (upper)—This trail is a long one with one end of the trail head up near Deer Flats and the other end on Lake Road. To increase safety, the Trailbuilder crew installed steps in a number of places and the volunteers may decide to install more steps in moderately steep places in the future. The lake road trail head is located at North 34 degrees, 19.452 by West 117 degrees, 50.463 at 5,728 feet (1,746 m). The other end of the trail is in the Deer Flats Campgrounds and it is located at North 34 degrees, 19.977 by West 117 degrees, 50.365 at 6,344 feet (1,934 m).
- Tototngna Nature Trail : 34°19′32″N 117°49′46″W —This trail was recently worked on (06/Jul/13) and is fully developed from end to end. This is a moderately long trail which forms a loop and can be accessed from a paved road. The trail head is located at North 34 degrees, 19.538 by West 117 degrees, 49.767 at 5,929 feet (1,807 m). Tototngna is rather special in that the trail crosses moist meadow areas and in the Spring boasts flora that is not usually seen anywhere else within the Recreation Area.
- Cedar Canyon Trail : 34°19′21″N 117°50′16″W —This trail has its start on the main road leading up to the Visitor Center. It's a moderately long trail that leads to a good volume of water. The trail actually meets up with Soldier Creek Trail which requires extensive repairs before the trail is safe and usable. The trail head for this end of the trail is located at North 34 degrees, 19.366 by West 117 degrees, 50.280 at 5,820 feet (1,770 m).
- Sunset Ridge Nature Trail : 34°20′00″N 117°50′14″W —This trail is located inside of the Deer Flats Campgrounds. It's a short trail which forms a loop that ends about 30 feet (9.1 m) from where it begins. The trail is currently being restored and about 20% of the trail has been completed. The location of this trail is at North 34 degrees, 20.002 by West 117 degrees, 50.249 at 6,423 feet (1,958 m).
- Islip Ridge Trail (a.k.a. Wawona Trail) : 34°19′07″N 117°50′41″W —This trail is located at the parking lot for the lake itself with a trailhead sign located approximately 100 feet (30 m) from the actual parking lot. The trail climbs an additional 2,200 feet (670 m) through approximately 7.2 miles (11.6 km) eventually reaching Angeles Crest Highway with access to Windy Gap, Little Jimmy, and other trails. Mile 1.65 is located approximately at North 34 degrees 19.292 by West 117 degrees, 51.066 at 6,293 feet (1,918 m).
- Mount Islip Trail : 34°20′36″N 117°49′44″W (Windy Gap Saddle) 34°20′10″N 117°50′44″W (Wawona Islip Junction) —This trail can be accessed either from Wawona Trail or from Windy Gap Saddle. The trail connects Mount Islip to the Recreation Area through Southbound hikes using wither Windy Gap Trail or Wawona / Islip Trail.
- Hawkins Ridge Trail : 34°20′36″N 117°48′17″W (Pacific Crest Trail junction) 34°18′56″N 117°48′34″W (Mount Hawkins Road Junction) —This trail can be reached off of the Pacific Crest Trail East of Windy Gap Saddle, or it can be reached by taking Mount Hawkins Road (which is abandoned but usable on foot and mountain bike.) The trail was last maintained across its full length in May 2016. The trail signs at the Northern end along the Pacific Crest Trail is missing as of July 2018.
- Trail from Windy Gap Saddle to Little Jimmy Trail Camp
- Trail from Windy Gap Saddle to Baden-Powell summit

== Major accomplishments ==
- Along the East Fork of the San Gabriel River the Trailbuilders are responsible for maintaining the trail which leads to the famous Bridge to Nowhere (San Gabriel Mountains) which includes the John Seals Bridge which spans across Laurel Gulch.
- Upper Bear Creek Trail required horses, mules, and 935 pounds of Tovex explosives to repair
- Ice House Canyon is one of the Trailbuilders most extensively-used trails which the organization maintains.

== Work schedule and joining ==
The Trailbuilders meet at the San Gabriel Canyon Gateway Center (located at 1960 N. San Gabriel Ave. Azusa, California 91702) on the first, third, and fifth Saturday of every month with additional work days scheduled through the Trailbuilder's mailing list.

Volunteers meet at Gateway and then leave at 8:00 a.m. to head toward the work site, work during the day, and generally return to Gateway at approximately 4:00 p.m. when the work effort is completed for the day.

== History ==
The SGMTB was founded in 1984 and have built trails (Mount Islip, Wawona, and many others) within the Angeles National Forest. The organization has historically maintained about 110 miles of trails within the San Gabriel Mountains.

== Contact information ==
- Mailing address: 978 Norumbega Drive, Monrovia, CA 91016-1821
- Reporting trail problems: SGMTBs Trail Reporting Web page
- EMail Addresses for the SGMTBs: SGMTBs About Us page
- SGMTBs on Facebook: SGMTBs Facebook page
- SGMTBs on Twitter: SGMTBs Twitter page

For emergency trail hazard reporting for issues located within the Crystal Lake Recreation Area, Mount Baldy, Big Bear, East, North and West Forks of the San Gabriel River, contact the San Gabriel Mountains National Monument Office:

- 110 N. Wabash Ave., Glendora, CA 91741
- (626) 335-1251, Ext. 221
- CRS (800) 735-2922 (Voice) CRS (800) 735-2929 (TDD/TTY) FAX (626) 914-3790

== Related volunteer organizations ==
- Angeles National Forest Fire Lookout Association — Restoration and operation of fire lookout towers in the ANF
- Altadena Mountain Rescue Team — Saving lives through mountain rescue and safety education
- Sierra Madre Search & Rescue — A group of dedicated volunteers committed to saving lives in the wilderness
- West Fork Conservancy — Maintains the West Fork of the San Gabriel River and Beer Creek
- Angeles Volunteer Association — Organizes Visitor Center information, trail repair, and a broad spectrum of forestry efforts
- Fisheries Resource Volunteer Corps — works with the Forest Service, helping with various projects during the year
- San Dimas Mountain Rescue Team — Highly trained mountain rescue team
- Los Angeles County Sheriff's Air Rescue 5 — Volunteer Reserve Deputy Sheriffs are paid $1 a year for their work
