= Disappointment Peak =

Disappointment Peak may refer to:

- Disappointment Peak (California) near West Bishop, California
- Disappointment Peak (Washington) in the North Cascades in Washington state
- Disappointment Peak (Wyoming) in the Teton Range of Wyoming

== See also ==
- Mount Disappointment (disambiguation)
