= Bridge to Nowhere (San Gabriel Mountains) =

Bridge in Southern California, United States

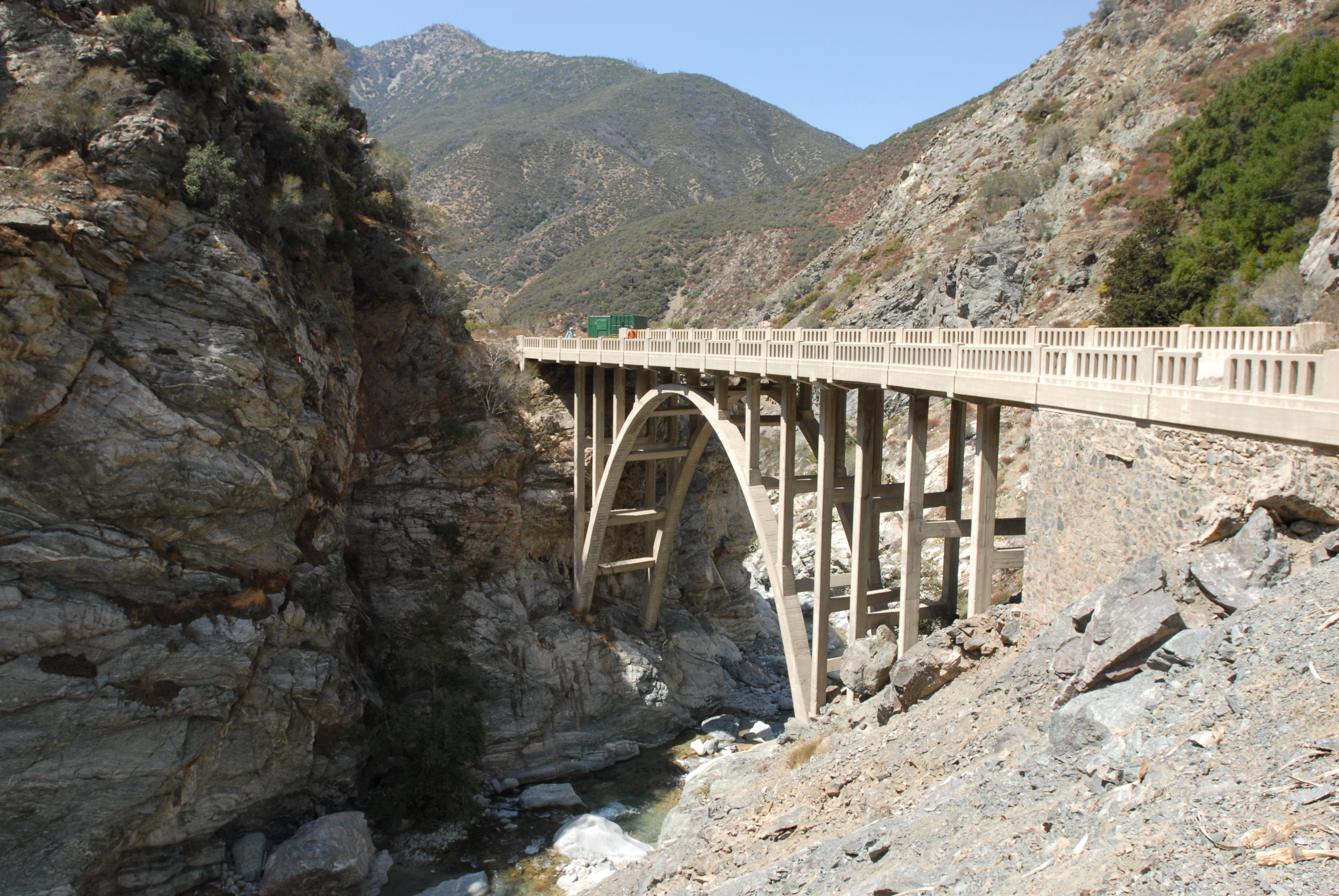
- The Bridge to Nowhere in the San Gabriel Mountains, Southern California
- Coordinates: 34°16′59″N 117°44′48″W
- Carries: Pedestrians
- Crosses: San Gabriel River
- Locale: San Gabriel Mountains, California

Characteristics
- Design: open spandrel arch
- Clearance below: 120 feet (37 m)

History
- Opened: 1936

The Bridge to Nowhere is an arch bridge that was built in 1936 north of Azusa, California, United States, in the San Gabriel Mountains. It spans the East Fork of the San Gabriel River and was originally intended to be part of a road connecting the San Gabriel Valley with Wrightwood, California.

== History ==
The East Fork Road was still under construction when it was washed out during the great flood of March 1–2, 1938. The East Fork Road project was abandoned as a result of the floods, leaving the bridge forever stranded in the middle of what is now the Sheep Mountain Wilderness.

Parts of the old asphalt roadway can still be found along the East Fork Trail which leads to the bridge, and there are still a number of concrete slabs which formed the foundations of destroyed bridges to the west of the Bridge to Nowhere. The sign along the trail 30 feet east of the John Seals Bridge which announces the start of the Sheep Mountain Wilderness is resting on the old roadbed.

== East Fork Trail ==
The bridge is only accessible via a 10-mile (16 km) round-trip hike. Despite its popularity, the frequency with which the trails get washed out means rough trail in places. The trail following the riverbed crosses the East Fork River at least six times between the trailhead and the bridge. Generally, one follows the river up its course, with several stream crossings before the ascent to the level of the bridge.

The maintenance of the East Fork Trail which leads to the Bridge to Nowhere is the responsibility of the San Gabriel Mountains Trailbuilders, a volunteer organization which works under the supervision of the United States Forest Service. Typically trail repairs and maintenance are performed by the Trailbuilders during the winter months when snow within the Crystal Lake Recreation Area makes trail working at higher elevations in the San Gabriel Mountains difficult and at times hazardous.

In addition to steps being carved out of rock faces to improve hiking safety, trail definition being improved through removing growth and rocks along the trail, and other typical trail work, the Trailbuilders also built the John Seals Bridge across Laurel Gulch, utilizing helicopters, horses, mules, and many human volunteers to establish concrete footings and assemble a solid wooden crossing to ensure safe passage across the gulch.

In May 2015 there was a major rock fall approximately 1.56 miles (2.51 km) inward along the trail at 34.25733°N 117.75089°W at 2,271 ft (692 m) altitude, which posed a significant safety hazard to climb over. Additionally there was a cornice overhang remaining that is poised to come down and there was more friable San Gabriel granite to the right of the calving which is poised to come down. The United States Forest Service was looking at the problem with the San Gabriel Mountains Trailbuilders to determine what can be done about the hazard. Safe passage through 50 meters (160 ft) of trail covered by the rock fall required crossing the river two additional times during a few months of the year; the riverbed is dry the rest of the year. As of July 2022 the official website still showed 2010 as the last worked date of the trail.

== Bungee jumping ==
The bridge is a private inholding within the Angeles National Forest. Bungee jumping is provided by a private company. Jumpers typically meet at the main parking area for Heaton Flats Campground early in the morning, collecting at the Forest Service gate and then walking to the East Fork Trail trailhead where jumpers begin the hike generally as a group. After individuals jump from the bridge, people hike back either alone or in pairs or in groups, sometimes doing so after dark.

== Safety issues ==
There have been a large number of fatalities along the East Fork of the San Gabriel River due in part to the swift water of the San Gabriel River which can rise significantly and without warning when heavy rainfall to the northeast of the region introduces flash flood waters to the river. Crossing the river to and from the Bridge to Nowhere can be dangerous; even individuals crossing in groups have experienced fatalities.

== Trail repair and reporting ==
Currently the San Gabriel Mountains Trailbuilders have repair and maintenance responsibility for the East Fork Trail from the Heaton Flats Campground, through the Sheep Mountain Wilderness, up to the foot of the bridge's leased land. Significant problems with the hiking trail which need to be addressed (dead trees blocking the trail, rock falls, extensive erosion) may be reported to the Trail Repairs web site, or they may be reported to the United States Forest Service by telephoning the San Gabriel River Ranger District.
