= Mount Disappointment =

Mount Disappointment can refer to:

- Mount Disappointment (California) in California, United States
- Mount Disappointment (Australia) in Victoria, Australia
- Disappointment Mountain, or Disappointment Hill, a peak in the Sawtooth Mountains of northeastern Minnesota
