= Sheep Mountain Wilderness =

Protected wilderness area in California, United States

- IUCN category Ib (wilderness area)
- Location within the United States
- Location: Los Angeles and San Bernardino counties, California, United States
- Nearest city: Glendora, California
- Coordinates: 34°13′48″N 117°38′10″W
- Area: 41,883 acres (169 km^{2})
- Established: 1984
- Governing body: United States Forest Service

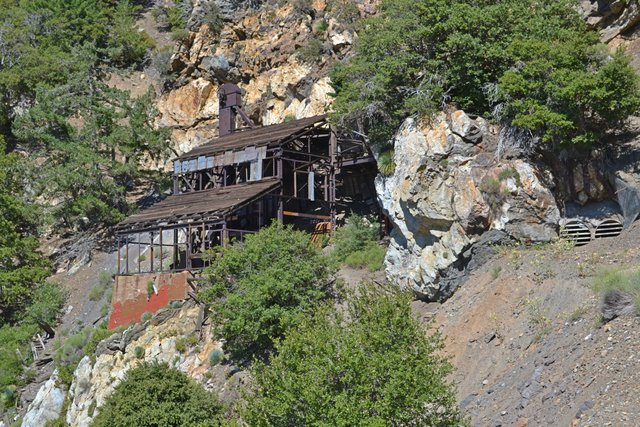
Big Horn Mine

Sheep Mountain Wilderness is a wilderness area of 41,883 acres (169 km^{2}) within the San Gabriel Mountains National Monument and managed by the Angeles National Forest. It is within Los Angeles County and San Bernardino County, southern California.

The U.S. Congress passed the California Wilderness Act of 1984, which created this wilderness area and added it to the National Wilderness Preservation System.

The wilderness includes Iron Mountain, an 8,007 ft (2,441 m) peak.

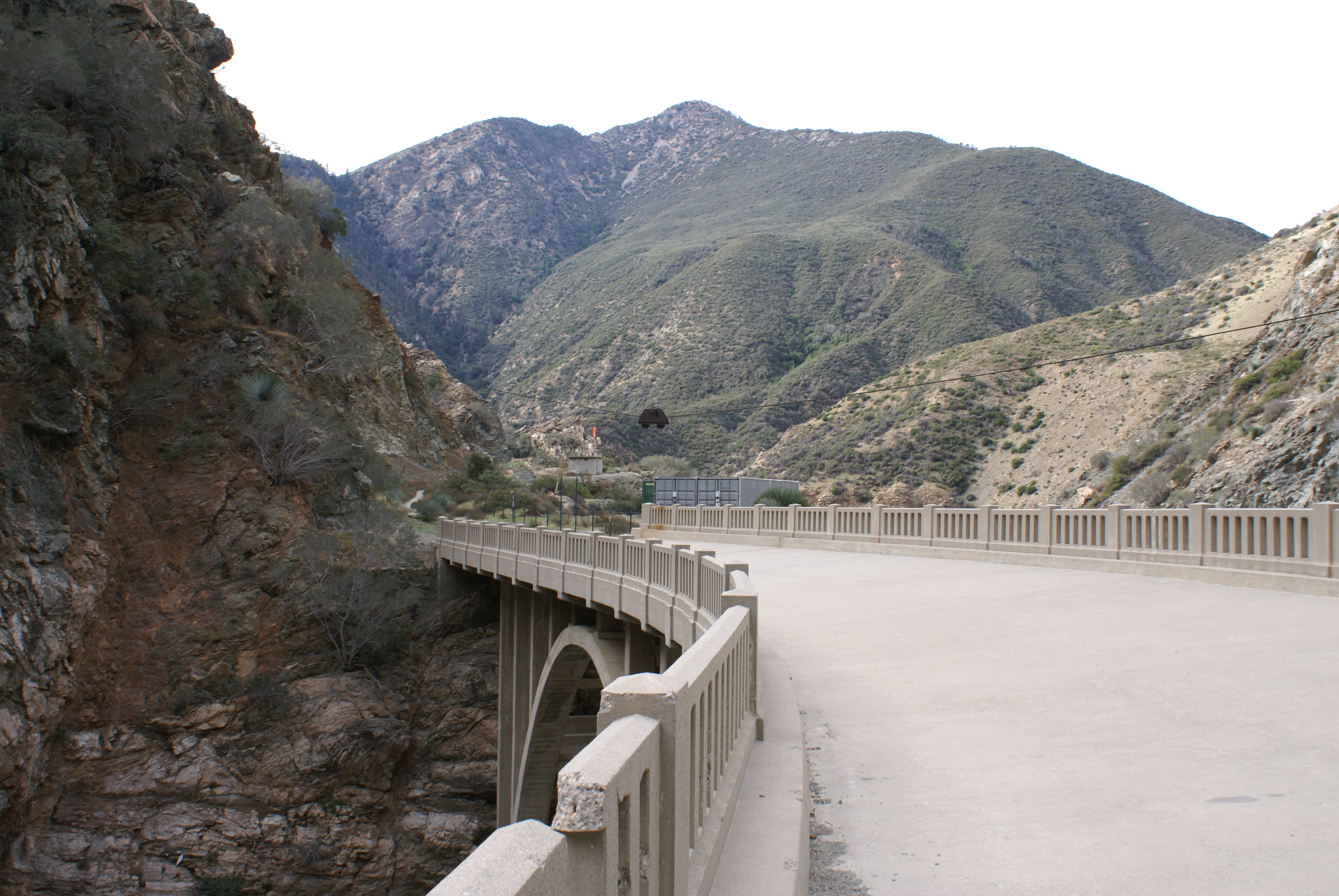
The Bridge to Nowhere

== Recreation ==
Notable hiking in the area includes Heaton Flat along the East Fork of the San Gabriel River to Bridge to Nowhere. Also popular for hikes is the trail to the 277-acre (1.12 km^{2}) Big Horn Mine, which was purchased from the owner in 2006 by the Wilderness Land Trust, and incorporated into the wilderness after being transferred to the US Forest Service.

== See also ==
- San Gabriel Mountains National Monument−related topics
