= Pacifico Mountain =

Mountain in Los Angeles County, California

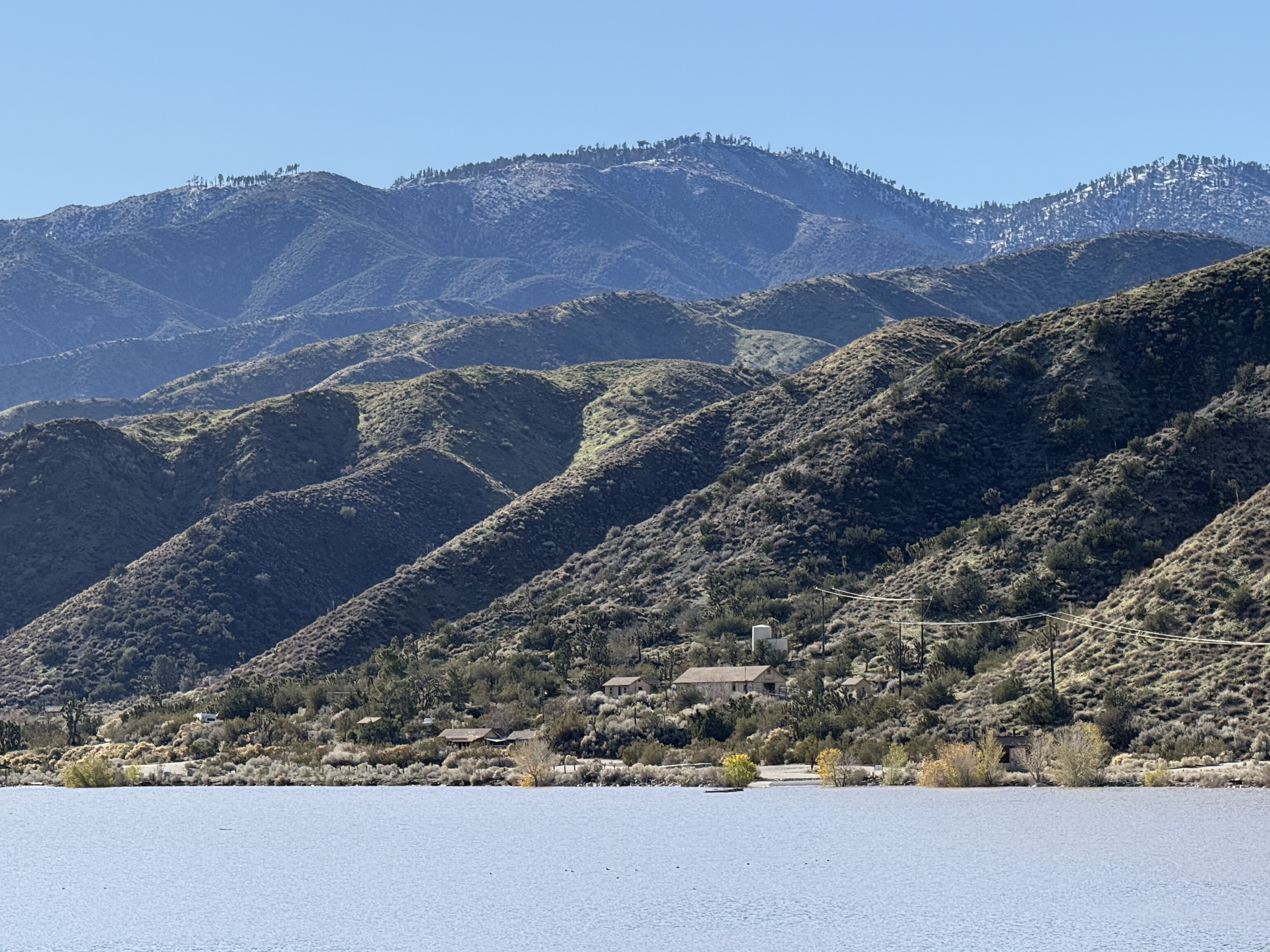
- Pacifico Mountain, North Aspect.

Highest point
- Elevation: 7,129 ft (2,173 m)
- Prominence: 1,568 ft (478 m)
- Listing: Hundred Peaks Section

Geography
- State: California
- Parent range: San Gabriel Mountains
- Topo map: USGS Pacifico Mountain

Pacifico Mountain is a 7,129 ft (2,173 m) mountain located in the San Gabriel Mountains in the Angeles National Forest in Los Angeles County, California.

== Description ==
Pacifico Mountain is located approximately 10 miles south-southwest of Littlerock, California.

The Pacific Crest Trail traverses the mountain and is the primary hiking route to the summit. The hike to the summit involves a strenuous 11.9 mile route with an elevation gain of 2,490 ft (759 m). A longer alternate hiking route is via Three Points on Angeles Crest Highway to the southeast.

There is a campground on Pacifico Mountain which can be accessed by vehicle on Forest Service Road 3N17. The road to the campground closes for the season when the first winter storm is projected.

Pacifico Mountain is located on the USGS 7.5 minute quadrangle map entitled “Pacifico Mountain.”

The peak was added to the Peak List of the Hundred Peaks Section of the Sierra Club in 1946.
