= Hoyt Mountain =

Mountain located in the Angeles National Forest

- Hoyt Mountain, South Aspect

Highest point
- Elevation: 4,416 ft (1,346 m)
- Prominence: 791 ft (241 m)

Geography
- State: California
- Parent range: San Gabriel Mountains
- Topo map: USGS Condor Peak

Hoyt Mountain is a 4,416 ft (1,346 m) mountain located in the San Gabriel Mountains in the Angeles National Forest in Los Angeles County, California.

== Description ==
Hoyt Mountain is located about 14 miles north of Pasadena, California.

The peak can be reached via steep hiking trails that ascend both the east and west side of the mountain. The access points are located along Angeles Crest Highway (SR-2). From the summit, there are views of downtown Los Angeles and Catalina Island.

Hoyt Mountain is located on the USGS 7.5 minute topographical map entitled “Condor Peak.”

The mountain was first noted on USGS topographical maps in 1995.

Hoyt Mountain is named after homesteader Silas Hoyt, who made his homestead claim in Vasquez Canyon north of Hoyt Mountain in 1913.
