= Bare Mountain (California) =

Mountain in Los Angeles County, California

- Bare Mountain, North Aspect.

Highest point
- Elevation: 6,388 ft (1,947 m)
- Prominence: 620 ft (189 m)
- Listing: Hundred Peaks Section

Geography
- State: California
- Parent range: San Gabriel Mountains
- Topo map: USGS Juniper Hills

Bare Mountain is a 6,388 ft mountain located in the San Gabriel Mountains in the Angeles National Forest in Los Angeles County, California.

== Description ==
Bare Mountain is located about 9 miles south of Littlerock, California. It is sparsely covered with chaparral and no trees.

The hike to the summit involves a moderately strenuous 5 mile hike primarily along firebreaks, with an elevation gain of 1,595 feet. The road to the trailhead closes seasonally in the winter months. Access points include taking Angeles Crest Highway (SR 2) and Sulphur Springs Road (near the Three Points junction).

Bare Mountain is located on the USGS 7.5 minute quadrangle map entitled "Juniper Hills." It was first noted The mountain was entered into the USGS Geographic Names Information System in 1981.

== Climate ==
According to the Köppen climate classification system, the San Gabriel Mountains are in the Mediterranean zone (Csa) with hot, sometimes very hot, dry summers. Winters can be mild, cold or chilly with some snowfall possible.

== Endangered species habitat ==
The area at the base of Bare Mountain along the Littlerock Creek corridor has been designated as critical habitat for the Arroyo Toad, Anaxyrus (Bufo) californicus, an endangered species.
