= Disappointed (disambiguation) =

Disappointed refers to disappointment. When capitalized it may also refer to:

== Music ==
- "Disappointed" (Public Image Ltd song), 1989
- "Disappointed" (Electronic song), with Neil Tennant, 1992
- "Disappointed" (Ivy song), 2001
- "Disappointed", by Stormzy
- "Disappointed", song by Death Grips from Year of the Snitch
- "Disappointed", song by Chlöe Howl
- "Disappointed", Morrisey B-side to Everyday Is Like Sunday
- "The Disappointed", a 1992 song by XTC

== See also ==
- Disappointment (disambiguation)
