= Pallett Mountain =

Mountain Peak

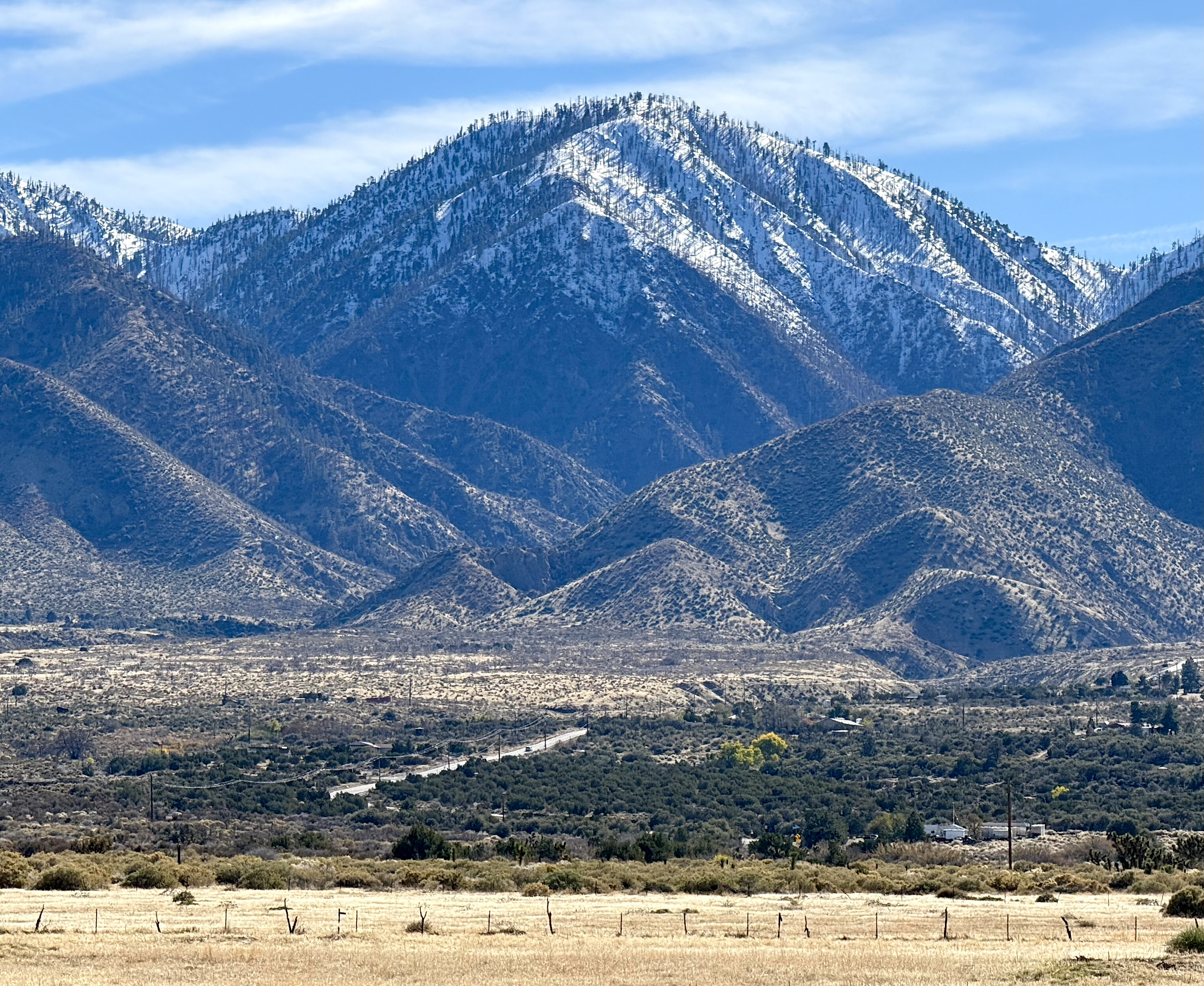
- Pallett Mountain, North Aspect.

Highest point
- Elevation: 7,760 ft (2,370 m)
- Prominence: 476 ft (145 m)
- Parent peak: Mount Williamson (8,248 ft)
- Listing: Hundred Peaks Section
- Coordinates: 34°23′06″N 117°53′07″W

Geography
- Location within California Location within the United States
- State: California
- Parent range: San Gabriel Mountains
- Topo map: USGS Juniper Hills

Pallett Mountain is a 7,760 ft (2,365 m) elevation mountain located in the San Gabriel Mountains in the Angeles National Forest in Los Angeles County, California.

== Description ==
Pallett Mountain is located approximately 8 miles (12.9 km) south of the unincorporated town of Pearblossom, California. It is named after the historic Pallett Family who owned a ranch near Big Rock Creek Canyon, also in Los Angeles County. Numerous other features in the area are named after the family, including Pallett Creek, itself near Pallett Mountain.

Hiking to the peak of Pallett Mountain involves a strenuous route, either from the south, via either Buckhorn Campground or Islip Saddle, or from the northeast from Devil's Punchbowl Natural Area. Each route involves over 3,500 feet (1,100 m) of elevation gain.

== Climate ==
Located in an area with a wide variety of climates, the ecosystems in the San Gabriel Mountain Range change as one moves up in elevation. In the lower elevations, the climate is Mediterranean, with dry summers and cool, wet winters. In the higher elevations, the climate becomes more continental and snow often falls above 4,000 ft (1,200 m) in the fall and winter months.

The area is known for being quite dry, with an average annual rainfall of only 40 in (100 cm). Fires are a frequent threat in the San Gabriel Mountains, especially during the summer and fall months.

== History ==
On September 30, 1966, a Fairchild C-119G Flying Boxcar plane crashed near Pallett Mountain in stormy weather, killing all four crew members on board. News sources referred to Pallett Mountain as the crash site, but the wreckage is located on what is now informally known as Boxcar Ridge just to its east.

"Pallett" first appeared on the State Mining Bureau Geological Map of California in 1916. In 1963, the peak name first appeared on USFS Angeles Forest maps.

The peak was added to the Peak List of the Hundred Peaks Section of the Sierra Club in 1965.
