= Disappointment Creek (Utukok River tributary) =

Stream in North Slope Borough, Alaska, U.S.

Coordinates: 69°15′N 159°51′W

Disappointment Creek is a stream in North Slope Borough, Alaska, in the United States. It is a tributary of the Utukok River

Disappointment Creek was so named when a surveyor found the creek did not lead to a gap in the De Long Mountains.

== See also ==
- List of rivers of Alaska
