= Disappointment Lake =

Disappointment Lake may refer to:

- Disappointment Lake (California)
- Disappointment Lake (New Brunswick)
- Disappointment Lake (Montana), in Lake County
- Kumpupintil Lake, a lake formerly known as "Lake Disappointment" in Western Australia
