= Wright Mountain (California) =

Mountain in San Bernardino County, California

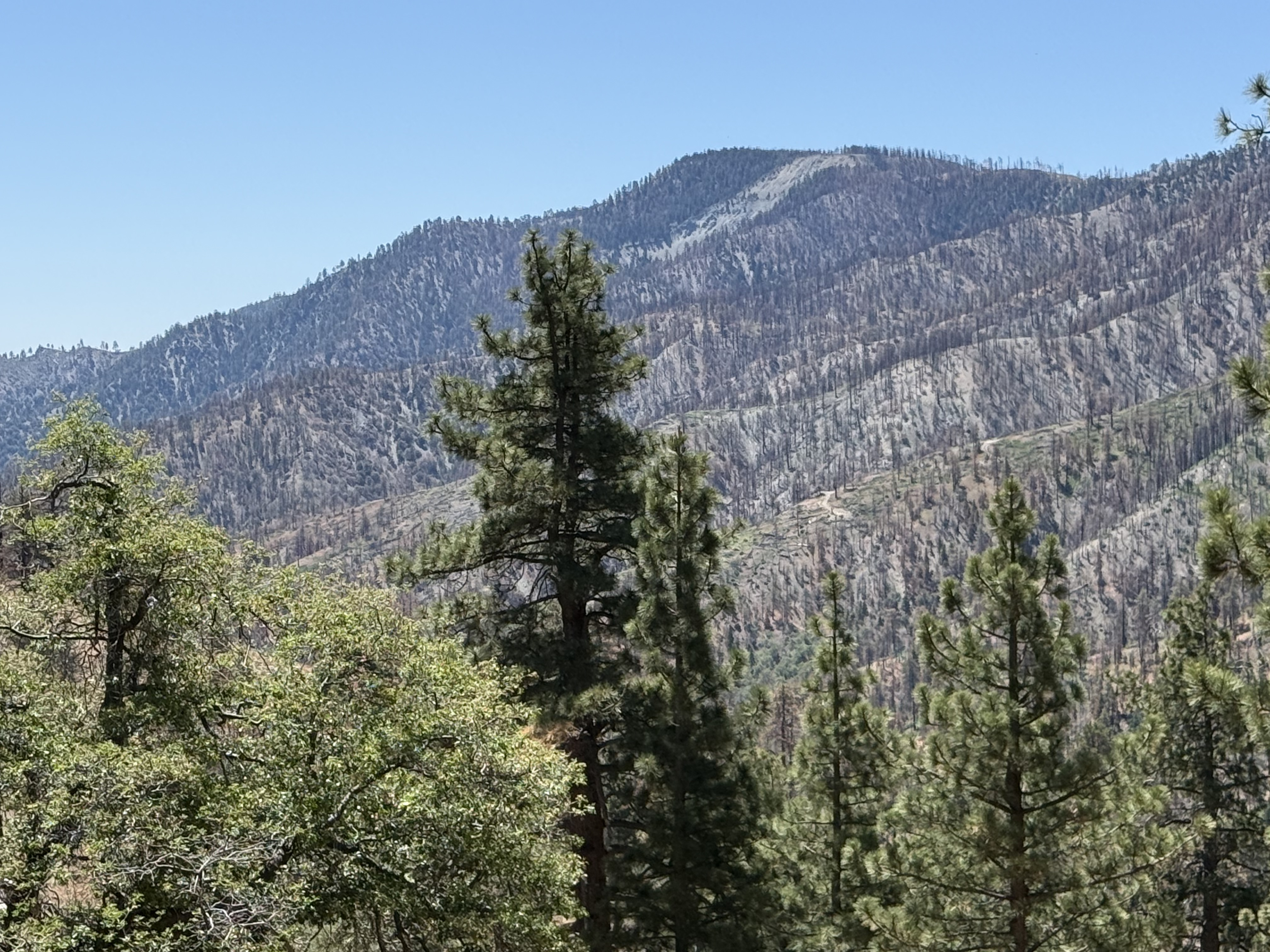
- Wright Mountain, northwest aspect

Highest point
- Elevation: 8,505 ft (2,592 m)

Geography
- State: California
- Parent range: San Gabriel Mountains
- Topo map: USGS Mount San Antonio

Wright Mountain is an 8,505 ft (2,592 m) mountain located in the San Gabriel Mountains in San Bernardino County, California.

== Description ==
Wright Mountain is located immediately to the south of the unincorporated town of Wrightwood, California.

Hiking to the peak of Wright Mountain involves a strenuous uphill hike from the town of Wrightwood via the Acorn Trail Wright Mountain is also the trailhead to the North Backbone Trail, which runs across Pine Mountain and Dawson Peak to Mt. Baldy. The Pacific Crest Trail (PCT) passes along the south side of Wright Mountain.

Wright Mountain is located on the USGS 7.5 minute topographical map entitled "Mount San Antonio."

Wright Mountain features two large landslides (Sheep Canyon and Heath Canyon) which are visible from the town of Wrightwood and beyond.

The Bridge Fire of 2024 burned portions of Wright Mountain.

== Climate ==
According to the Köppen climate classification system, Wright Mountain is located in a continental climate zone (Dsa) with mostly dry summers (except for occasional thunderstorms) and cold, wet winters. Most weather fronts originating in the Pacific Ocean travel east toward the San Gabriel Mountains. As fronts approach, they are forced upward by the mountain peaks (orographic lift) causing them to drop moisture onto the range.

== History ==
Wright Mountain is named after Sumner Banks Wright who owned and developed the town of Wrightwood in the early 1900s.
