= San Gabriel Peak =

Mountain in California, United States

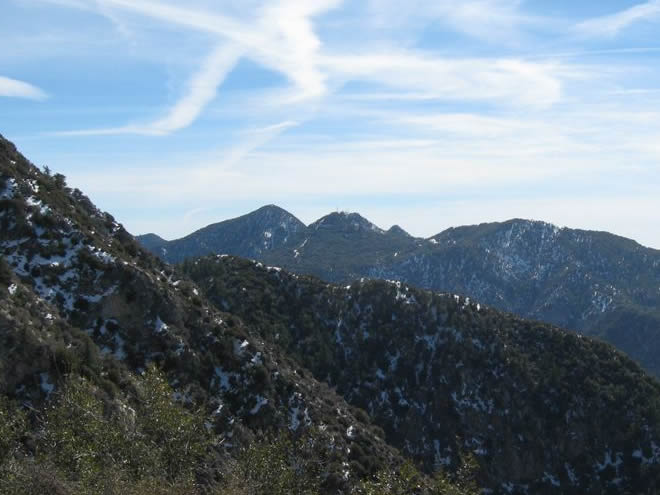
- San Gabriel Peak, seen from the north.

Highest point
- Elevation: 6,164 ft (1,879 m) NAVD 88
- Prominence: 1,561 ft (476 m)
- Listing: Hundred Peaks Section
- Coordinates: 34°14′36″N 118°05′54″W

Naming
- English translation: Saint Gabriel
- Language of name: Spanish

Geography
- Location within California Location within the United States
- Location: Los Angeles County California, U.S.
- Parent range: San Gabriel Mountains
- Topo map: USGS Mount Wilson

Climbing
- First ascent: Wheeler Survey, 1875
- Easiest route: Hike, class 1

San Gabriel Peak is a summit in the San Gabriel Mountains in the U.S. state of California. It was named by the United States Geological Survey in 1894 and is located in the Angeles National Forest. This peak was first named The Commodore for Commodore Perry Switzer.

== Background ==
The name is derived from the Misión del Santo Arcangel San Gabriel de los Temblores. From this mission had already come the names of the San Gabriel River and San Gabriel Canyon, the mountain range itself and the entire San Gabriel Valley.

The steep south face drops approximately 1,000 feet into the center of an amphitheater at the top of Eaton Canyon, forming one of the most sustained steep slopes in the Western San Gabriel mountain range.
