= Cape Disappointment =

Cape Disappointment can refer to:

- Cape Disappointment (Washington), at the mouth of the Columbia River in western Washington State
  - Cape Disappointment State Park, a state park occupying most of Cape Disappointment commemorating its historical significance
- Cape Disappointment (South Georgia)
- Cape Disappointment (South Orkney Islands)
- Cape Disappointment (Antarctica)
