= Mount Disappointment (California) =

Mountain in United States of America

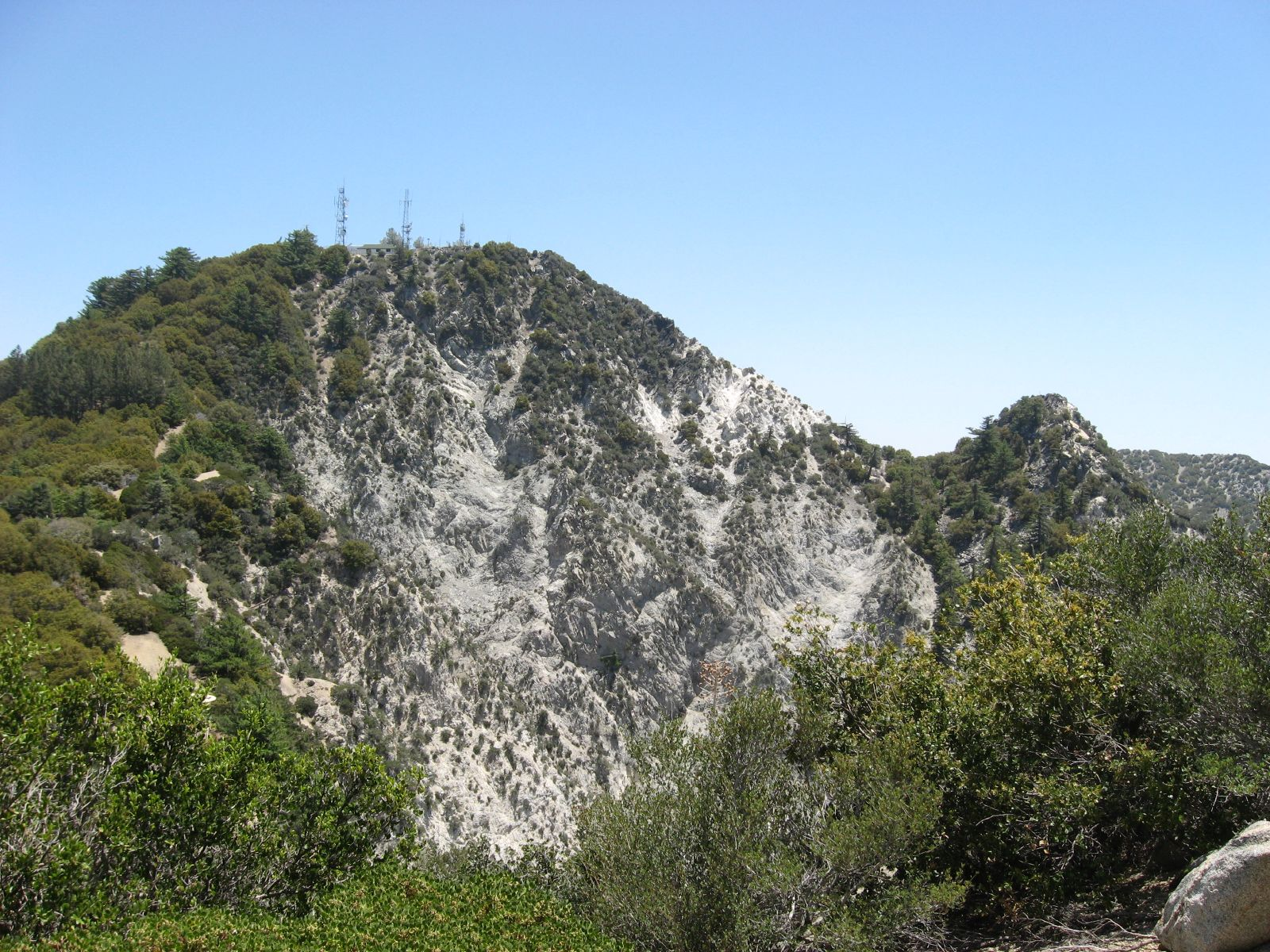
- Mount Disappointment from the west, May 2009.

Highest point
- Elevation: 5,963+ ft (1,818+ m) NAVD 88
- Listing: Hundred Peaks Section
- Coordinates: 34°14′48″N 118°06′17″W

Geography
- Location within California Location within the United States
- Location: Los Angeles County, California, U.S.
- Parent range: San Gabriel Mountains
- Topo map: USGS Mount Wilson

Climbing
- First ascent: 1875 by F. Kampf, W.A. Coles, and Frank Holland
- Easiest route: Hike, class 1

Mount Disappointment is a mountain in the San Gabriel Mountains in Los Angeles County, California with a summit elevation of 5,963+ feet (1,818+ m). It was named "Disappointment" in 1894 when USGS surveyors in the Wheeler Survey sighted it from the Santa Susana Mountains, believing it to be the highest point in the immediate area, decided to use it as their next triangulation point. When they reached the summit, however, they discovered that San Gabriel Peak half a mile (0.8 km) to the east was 167 feet (51 m) higher and it was a disappointment so they moved there instead.

A Nike missile site was located there in 1955 and the summit was flattened to accommodate it. The missile site was abandoned in 1965. The mountain top is now an important telecommunications site for both commercial and government organizations.
