= Angeles volunteer association =

Volunteer organization for trail maintenance

The Angeles Volunteer Association (AVA) is a public service organization dedicated to the preservation and care of the Angeles National Forest working under the safety oversight and supervision of the United States Forest Service as a 501(c)3 non-profit organization.

== Mission ==
The AVA volunteers assist the U.S. Forest Service in its efforts to maintain forest resources and to provide visitors with opportunities to enjoy outdoor activities, such as camping, picnicking, hiking and fishing. To meet those goals, the AVA volunteers maintain annual and bi-annual training and certification in a broad spectrum of forest-related issues such as First aid, Situation awareness, radio communications, Interpersonal relationship and Conflict resolution training, all designed to assist volunteers to work professionally with forest visitors.

AVA volunteers work with the Forest Service, the visitor public, and with High Schools and Colleges to provide staffing for such wide services as

- Hiking trail safety patrols
- Staff Forest Service Visitor Centers
- Outreach education gathering at schools and City events
- Working with Schools and other groups on Forest-related projects

Most of the volunteer work which the AVA does takes place within the San Gabriel River (California) Ranger District of the U. S. Forest Service, located North of the City of Azusa, California, often within the Crystal Lake Recreation Area of the Angeles National Forest.

== Organization ==
The Angeles Volunteer Association was founded in 1993 as a California 501(c)3 organization which works closely with the U. S. Forest Service. Meetings are held by AVA volunteers once a month on the third Tuesday at 7:00 p.m. In the city of Glendora, California at the Church Of The Brethren on the corner of Glendora Avenue and Carroll Avenue.

The meetings are chaired by a President of the Board of Directors, and all volunteers who participate in the AVA work with the Board to establish work schedules, handle finance decisions, and set the scope and venue of work to take place during the coming months.

== Mailing Address ==
Angeles Volunteer Association, Post Office Box 611, Glendora, CA. 91740
