= Disappointment Mountain =

Peak in Minnesota, USA

- Location within Minnesota

Highest point
- Elevation: 1,814 ft (553 m)
- Coordinates: 47°59′42″N 91°19′50″W

Geography
- Location: Fall Lake Township, Lake County, Minnesota, U.S.
- Parent range: Sawtooth Mountains

Disappointment Mountain, also sometimes called Disappointment Hill, is a peak in northeastern Minnesota. It is located about a mile east of the lake which shares its name.
