= Altadena Mountain Rescue =

California search and rescue team

- Formation: 1951, member unit of the Sheriff's Department Reserve Forces Bureau since 1956
- Type: 501(c)(3) nonprofit volunteer organization
- Purpose: Dedicated to saving lives through mountain rescue and safety education
- Headquarters: Los Angeles County Sheriff's Department Altadena Station
- Website: http://www.amrt.org/

The Altadena Mountain Rescue Team is staffed by reserve Los Angeles County Sheriff deputies (all volunteer). The organization's goals are saving lives through mountain rescue and safety education. Headquartered at the Altadena Sheriff's Station, near the San Gabriel Mountains, the team is operational 24 hours each day, 365 days every year. It is one of eight teams in the Los Angeles County which, together, are staffed by 120 trained members.

== About ==
Established in 1951, it is the oldest organization of its kind in Los Angeles County. The Altadena Mountain Rescue Team is a nonprofit volunteer organization dedicated to saving lives through mountain rescue and safety education. It has been a member unit of the Sheriff's Department Reserve Forces Bureau since 1956.

Headquartered at the Altadena Sheriff's Station, the team is staffed by reserve deputies and is operational 24 hours each day, 365 days every year. It is one of eight teams in the Los Angeles County which, together, are staffed by 120 trained members.

On the average, the Altadena Mountain rescue Team assists approximately 100 lost or injured hikers and conducts almost 40 searches and rescues every year. In addition to those rescues within Los Angeles County, the team has also participated in rescue operations throughout California, and in New York, Hawaii, and Mexico.

The team conducts weekend patrols of the mountain areas within its jurisdiction, namely the 20 canyons behind Altadena and Pasadena. Members are assigned weekend duty on a rotating basis, which averages once every month. These patrols ensure a quick response to emergencies during a time when they are most likely to occur, and serve as a means of fire prevention and mountain safety.

Mountain rescue team members come from all walks of life. The professional occupations of volunteer members have included: teachers, paramedics, construction contractors, lawyers, registered nurses, chiropractors, mechanical and electronic engineers, physician assistants, police officers, firemen, and corporate managers.

As a nonprofit corporation, the Altadena Mountain Rescue Team is governed by a five-member Board of Directors. Each member is elected during an annual election and serves a one-year term. The positions comprising the board are: President (Captain), Vice President (Lieutenant), Secretary Ops (Sergeant), Quartermaster (Sergeant), and Public Relations Chairman (Sergeant).
