= Theodore Parker Lukens House =

Historic house in California, United States

- U.S. National Register of Historic Places
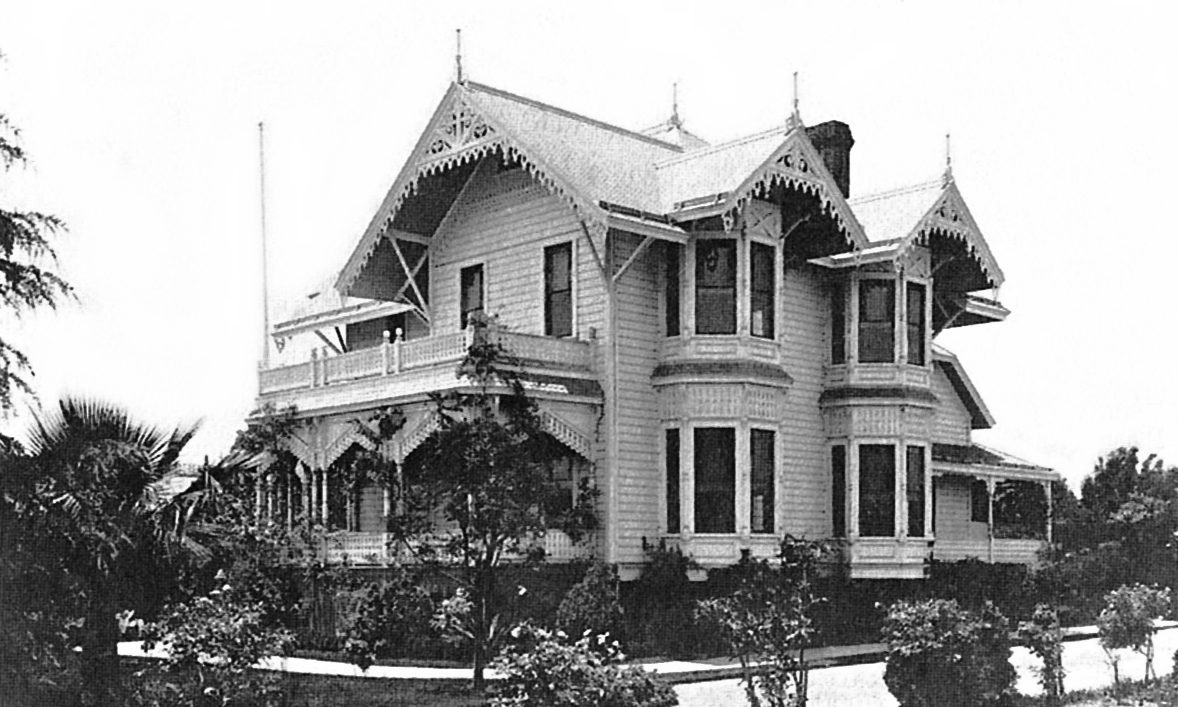
- The house in the 1880s

- Location within the Los Angeles metropolitan area Location within California Location within the United States
- Location: 267 N. El Molino Ave., Pasadena, California
- Coordinates: 34°9′2″N 118°8′15″W
- Area: 0.3 acres (0.12 ha)
- Built: 1886-87
- Architect: Ridgway, Harry
- Architectural style: Stick, Eastlake, Queen Anne
- NRHP reference No.: 84000879
- Added to NRHP: March 29, 1984

The Theodore Parker Lukens House is a historic house, located at 267 North El Molino Avenue, in Pasadena, California. Built in 1886–87, the house is among the oldest standing in Pasadena. Architect Harry Ridgway designed the Victorian house; while its design is mainly influenced by the Stick and Eastlake subtypes, it also includes elements of the Queen Anne style. The house features multiple deep gables and gabled dormers with decorative stickwork hanging from the edges. The two-story front porch is supported by decorative posts and features patterned bargeboards above the first floor designed to resemble curtains.

== Background ==
The house's first owner, Theodore Parker Lukens, was a prominent horticulturalist and local real estate dealer. Lukens was a charter member of the Sierra Club and a friend of naturalist John Muir, and he was responsible for many of the club's early activities in Southern California. Lukens also led California's first attempts at reforestation in the 1890s. For his efforts, Lukens was given the moniker "Father of Forestry", and Lukens Lake and Mount Lukens in California are named for him.

The house was added to the National Register of Historic Places on March 29, 1984.

== Gallery ==
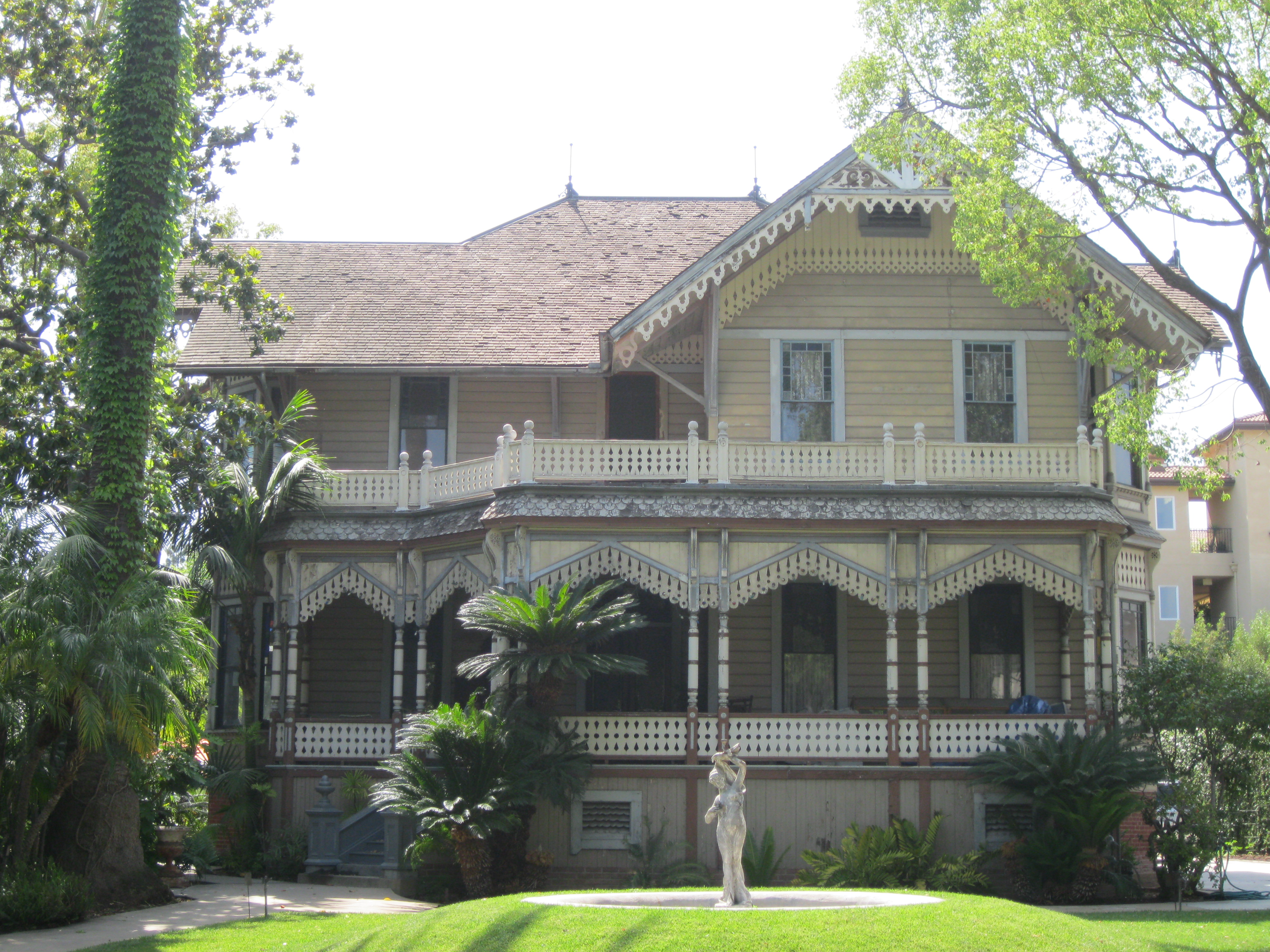
The house in 2014
