= Waterman Mountain =

Mountain in the San Gabriel Mountains of California

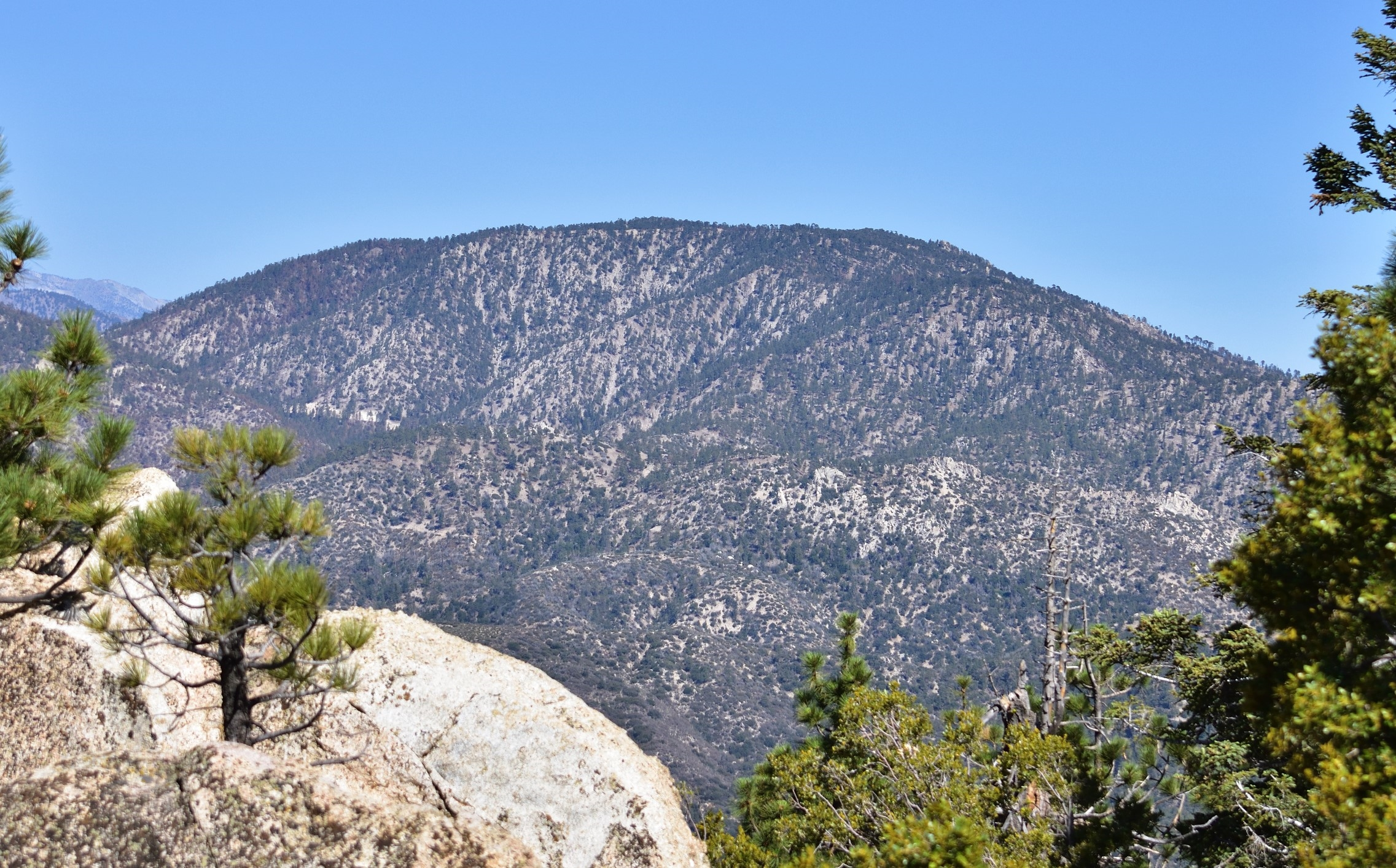
- Northwest aspect

Highest point
- Elevation: 8,041 ft (2,451 m) NAVD 88
- Listing: Hundred Peaks Section
- Coordinates: 34°20′10″N 117°56′11″W

Geography
- Location within California Location within the United States
- Location: Los Angeles County, California, U.S.
- Parent range: San Gabriel Mountains
- Topo map: USGS Waterman Mountain

Climbing
- Easiest route: Waterman Loop, Trail hike class 1

Waterman Mountain, at 8,041 feet (2,451 m), is a prominent peak in the San Gabriel Mountains of Los Angeles County, California, within the Angeles National Forest and San Gabriel Mountains National Monument.

The summit of Waterman Mountain marks the northern boundary of the San Gabriel Wilderness and it is the highest point in the wilderness.

== Ecology ==
During winter and early spring this mountain is packed with snow. Snow may even be found in September lying on Waterman mountain. Spring brings a lot of rain and makes Waterman covered in wildflowers. Summers are hot and dry. The climate here is Highlands/Mediterranean. Partly due to this climate, mixed conifer forests are found on Waterman Mountain, Fauna is greatly influenced because of this climate.

== Recreation ==
Several small ski areas are located on its north side: Mount Waterman, Kratka Ridge, and Buckhorn Ski Club.

The Buckhorn and Cooper Campgrounds are below the peak on the Angeles Crest Highway.

== History ==
Robert B. Waterman was a pioneer mountain man and a ranger in the San Gabriel Forest Reserve. He, with his wife Liz and their friend Perry Switzer, completed a three-week journey from La Cañada to the Antelope Valley and back in May 1889. With this accomplishment, Liz became the first non-indigenous woman known to have crossed the San Gabriel Mountains. It is said that she placed a cairn on this summit and so it was named Lady Waterman's Peak. However, with prevailing attitudes toward the "weaker sex" the name was not accepted and it became known as simply Waterman Mountain.

The area was severely impacted by the Station fire in 2009.
