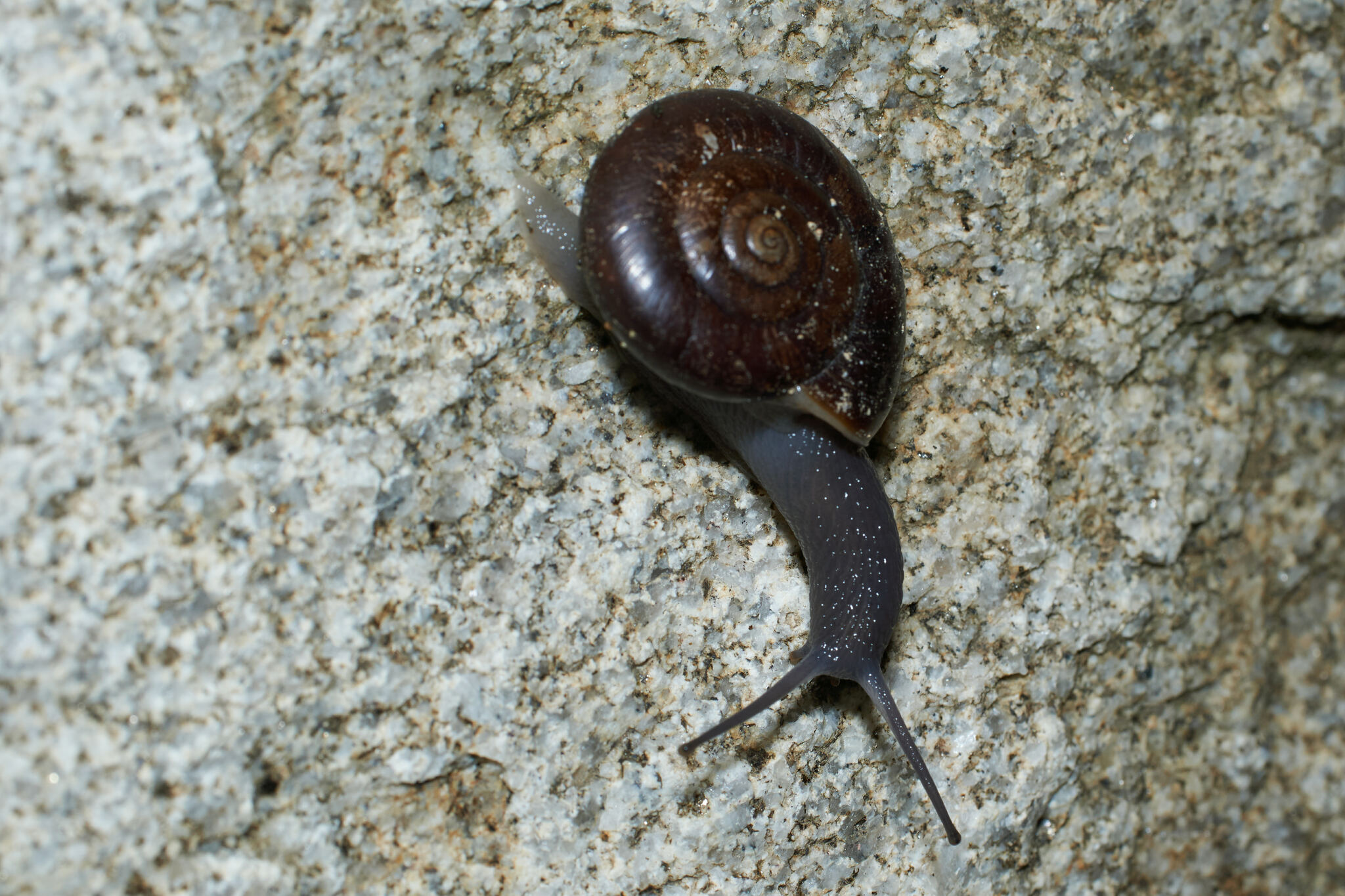

Conservation status
- Imperiled (NatureServe)

Scientific classification
- Kingdom: Animalia
- Phylum: Mollusca
- Class: Gastropoda
- Order: Stylommatophora
- Family: Megomphicidae
- Genus: Glyptostoma
- Species: G. gabrielense

Binomial name
- Glyptostoma gabrielense Pilsbry, 1938

= Glyptostoma gabrielense =

Species of gastropod

Glyptostoma gabrielense, commonly known as the San Gabriel chestnut or San Gabriel chestnut snail, is a species of air-breathing land snail in the family Megomphicidae. It is found in the San Gabriel Mountains, including in Angeles National Forest and San Gabriel Mountains National Monument, as well as historically in lowlands in parts of the Los Angeles Basin.

== Description ==
Glyptostoma gabrielense is a medium species of snail, with the flattened disk-like shell spanning approximately 30 millimetres (1.2 in) across and 14 millimetres (0.55 in) high. The shell is dark chestnut brown in color and the snail's body is dark gray.

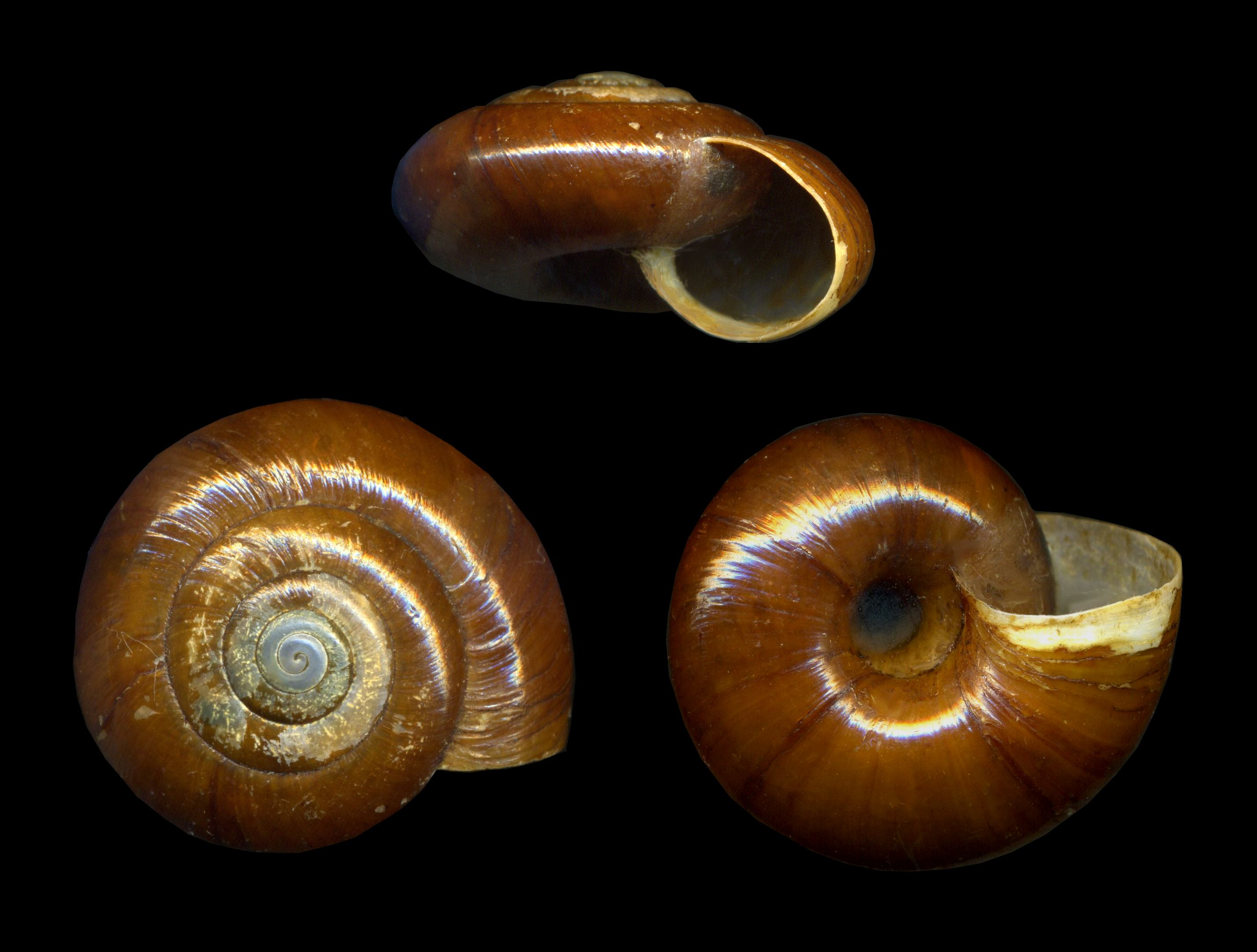
Three views of a shell of Glyptostoma gabrielense

== Distribution and habitat ==
Glyptostoma gabrielense is native to a narrow strip of the front range of the San Gabriel Mountains about 15 miles (24 km) long near Pasadena, California, where it inhabits riparian canyons and other areas with sufficient seasonal moisture. It was historically also found in the Dominguez Hills to the south; this population has since been extirpated. Prior to the extensive development and habitat clearing that took place in the lower elevations of the San Gabriel Valley, this species was likely found there as well.

== Ecology ==
The small range occupied by Glyptostoma gabrielense represents a portion of the California Floristic Province, and as such this species' habitat experiences a Mediterranean climate involving extremely dry summers with almost no precipitation. During wet conditions during the cooler months, G. gabrielense is able to move on the surface. During the dry season (usually June through October), this species aestivates underground.

Like other Glyptostoma snails, G. gabrielense feeds on decomposing plant material as well as fungi and bacteria involved in the decomposition process.
