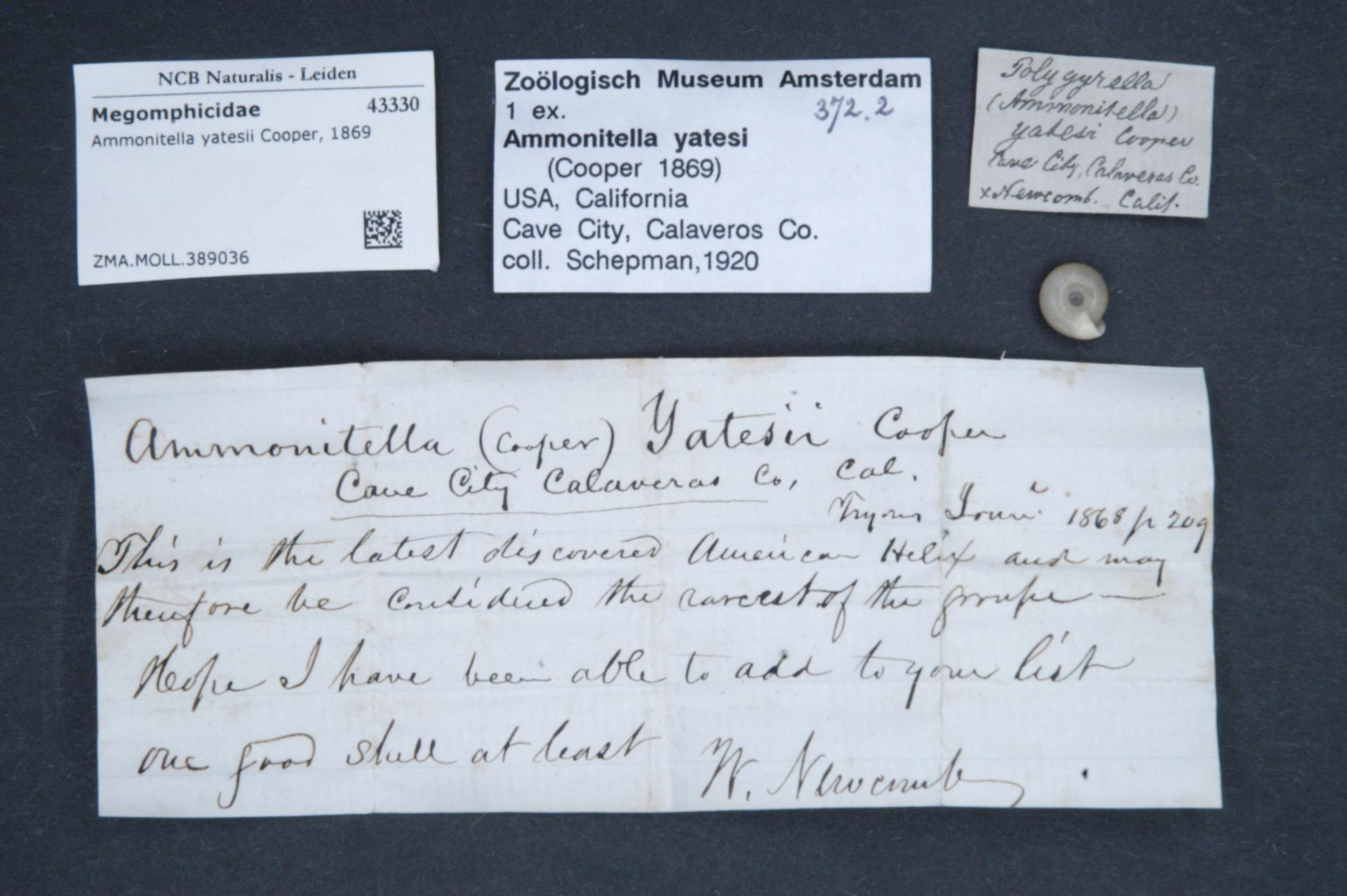
- A specimen collected in 1869

Conservation status
- Vulnerable (IUCN 2.3)

- Critically Imperiled (NatureServe)

Scientific classification
- Kingdom: Animalia
- Phylum: Mollusca
- Class: Gastropoda
- Order: Stylommatophora
- Family: Megomphicidae
- Genus: Ammonitella
- Species: A. yatesii

Binomial name
- Ammonitella yatesii J.G. Cooper, 1869

= Ammonitella yatesii =

Species of gastropod

Ammonitella yatesii, commonly known aa the tight coin, is a species of troglodytic land snail in the family Megomphicidae. This species is endemic to California, United States.

The shell in this species is very tightly coiled, hence the common name.
