= Mount Waterman =

Ski resort in southern California, United States

- Location in California Mount Waterman (the United States)
- Location: Waterman Mountain; San Gabriel Mountains; Angeles National Forest
- Nearest city: Pasadena, California
- Coordinates: 34.349722°N 117.928611°W
- Vertical: 1,030 ft (310 m)
- Top elevation: 8,030 ft (2,450 m)
- Base elevation: 7,000 ft (2,100 m)
- Skiable area: 150 acres (61 ha)
- Trails: 27 total 20% beginner 20% intermediate 60% advanced
- Lift system: 3 chairlifts
- Snowfall: 180 in (460 cm)
- Snowmaking: No
- Night skiing: No
- Website: www.mtwaterman.org/

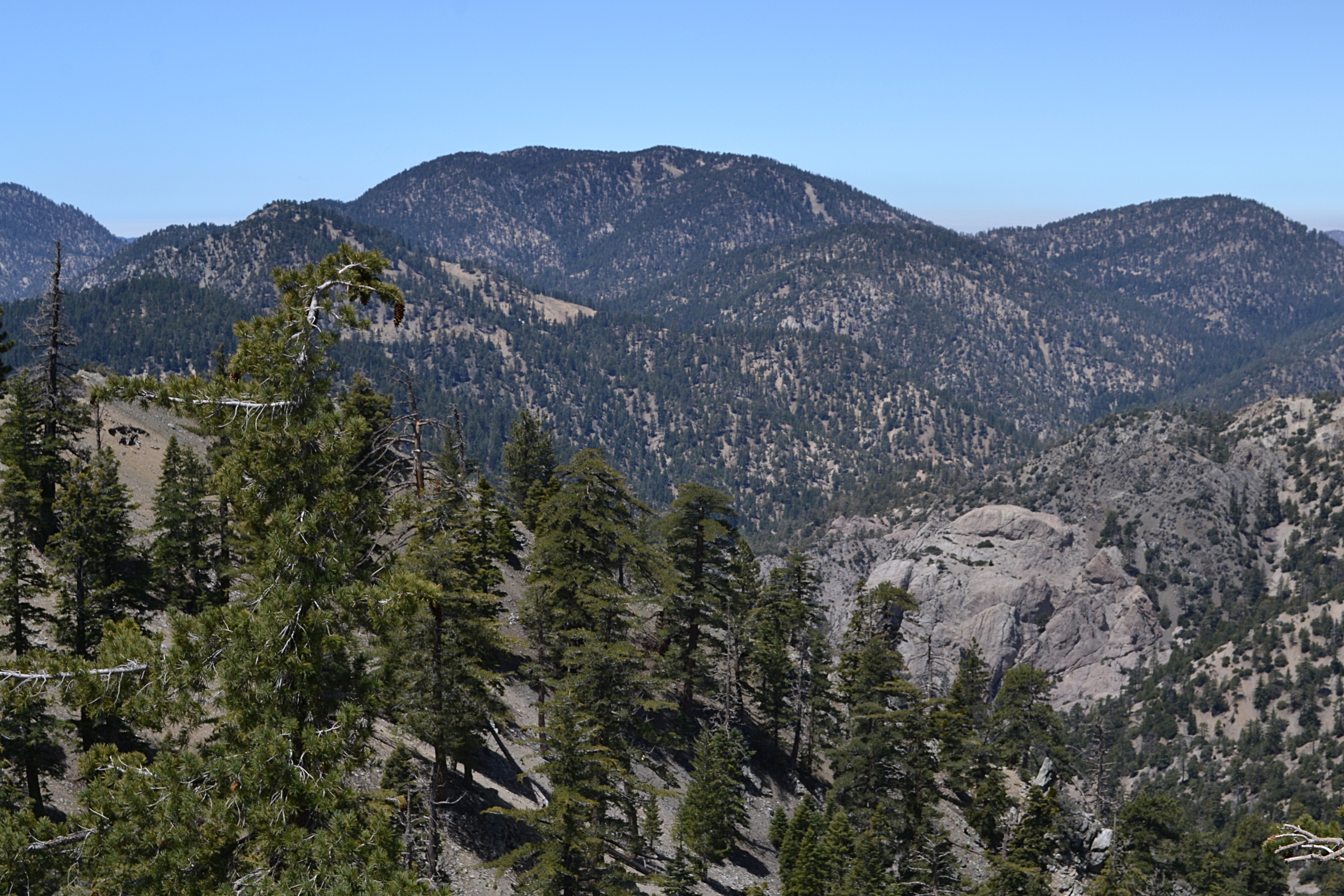
Mount Waterman from the east

Mount Waterman is a ski area on Waterman Mountain in the San Gabriel Mountains of the Angeles National Forest in Los Angeles County, California, above Azusa. The area is located on California State Route 2, the Angeles Crest Highway, and reaches a height of 8,030 ft (2,450 m) with an overall vertical drop of 1,030 ft (310 m). Mount Waterman is leased under a special use permit from the United States Forest Service. Skiable terrain is distributed as: 20% beginner, 20% intermediate, and 60% advanced.

== History ==
Mount Waterman is a little-known ski area on Waterman Mountain in the San Gabriel Mountains of the Angeles National Forest in Los Angeles County, California. The ski area has never advertised on television, magazines, or billboards, has a weak social media presence on Facebook that has not been updated since Fall 2024, no official Instagram account, and a website that has not been updated since 2019. As a result, many in Southern California are unaware it even exists.

A large tract of land in the San Gabriel Mountains was leased from the United States Forest Service in 1888 to master trailblazer and cabin builder Louis Newcomb.

Robert B. Waterman was a pioneer mountain man and a ranger in the San Gabriel Forest Reserve. Waterman, together with his wife Liz and their friend Perry Switzer, completed a three-week hike from La Cañada to the Antelope Valley and back in May 1889. With this feat, Liz supposedly became the first non-Indigenous woman known to have crossed the San Gabriels. Along the way, she placed a cairn on this summit, and christened it "Lady Waterman's Peak". The peak was subsequently referred to by different names, all of which left out "Lady". Robert Waterman made numerous, futile efforts to have the full name restored.

== Beginnings ==
Lynn Newcomb, Sr. (March 23, 1896 – November 1, 1945) with his half-brother William (February 24, 1904 – November 26, 1975) and his sons Renfro Newcomb (June 17, 1926 – February 3, 2003) and Lynn Newcomb, Jr. (May 1, 1920 – September 5, 2011) built the first rope tow in the area in 1939. Mount Waterman claims to have had the second chairlift in California, opened by the Newcombs on January 1, 1941. The chairlift broke down during opening day, and riders had to jump off, but the resort continued to operate.

Lynn Newcomb, Jr. took over the operation after his father's death at only age 49. Until 1968, the area retained its single chair, chair lift and three rope tows from 1941. Then chair number two was added, a fixed grip double. The 1968–69 season brought extensive snowfall. The original single chair was replaced in 1972 with a fixed grip double. In 1981, chair three was added. Lynn Jr. ran the ski area for all but a two-year period, until the 1990s, when it was sold to two San Gabriel Valley businessmen. Those new owners returned the resort to Lynn Newcomb Jr. when their ambitious plans for snowmaking and other improvements at the ski area all fell through.

== Angeles Crest Resorts (ACR) ==
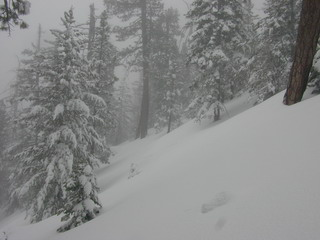
Mt. Waterman in March, 2000

Lynn Newcomb Jr. sold Mount Waterman to a group of Southern California businessmen, the main investors being Barry R. Stubblefield of Valencia, owner of a lighting business, and his brother Gregory R. Stubblefield of Pasadena, a United Way benefactor and regional president and chairman of Enterprise Rent-A-Car), James "Jim" R. Newcomb, and Charles "Chuck" W. Ojala both also residing in Valencia.). Together they formed Angeles Crest Resorts (ACR) and operated Mount Waterman and the neighboring Snowcrest ski area beginning in 1999. Kratka was barely open for the 2000 ski season. Kratka then closed permanently when a mysterious fire destroyed the chairlift base area in December 2001, and the permit was revoked.

Mount Waterman did not operate between July 2001 and February 2008, mostly due to a failure to meet U.S. Forest Service operating requirements. Mount Waterman's natural snow is sometimes preserved by tree shading and a steep north exposure. However, the snowfall is very erratic, and it has no snowmaking equipment. The ski area is unable to operate in dry years such as the 2001–2002 season. Mount Waterman's commercial appeal is also limited by its topography: there is a beginner area only up top, and abundant steep glades for experts, but very limited terrain for intermediate skiers.

== Death of Waterman investor/owner Barry Stubblefield ==
On January 21, 2005, Barry R. Stubblefield (August 17, 1956 – January 21, 2005), was digging out Waterman after a snowstorm. While skiing downhill, he fell and tumbled out of control until he slammed into a tree and was killed instantly, according to Sgt. Don Hudalla of the Los Angeles County Sheriff's Crescenta Valley Station. He was 48-years-old.

== 2004–2005 season ==
The Southern California region had then nearly record-breaking precipitation the winter of 2004-05. Los Angeles almost broke its then highest record for precipitation. In February 2005 there was 3 to 6 ft (1 to 2 m) snowpack, and then another 10 to 12 ft (3 to 4 m) of powder fell. This information was obtained from the caretaker at Mount Waterman via mobile phone. The first snowfall was before Halloween 2004 and averaged 3.5 ft (1.1 m); in early May 2005 there was still a snowpack of about 2 ft (0.61 m). This snowpack rivaled the record El Niño years of 1982-83 and 1997–98, but in 2004–05 the area was still not open to the public. Stories of long hikes up the closed Angeles Crest Highway to Cloudburst Summit, then onto the buried lodge, are remembered by a select few. One snowfall that year reached the bull wheel at the base of chair one. The top of one was merely a mound of snow with a channel cut through, while the lodge was completely buried.

== Mount Waterman LLC ==
On July 2, 2006, the Pasadena Star-News reported that Richard (Rick) Metcalf, an associate of Lynn Newcomb, and longtime Waterman skier, had formed Mount Waterman LLC and purchased the Mount Waterman and Kratka Ridge ski areas. Richard Metcalf, a San Diego realtor, was securing operating permits with the goal of reopening Mount Waterman for the 2006-2007 ski season. 2006–07 was one of the driest seasons in Los Angeles history, so Mount Waterman never had enough snow to open. A new Mount Waterman website launched on January 11, 2008, and a notice was posted that they were trying to open in early February 2008.

== February 2008 reopening ==
Mount Waterman officially reopened February 16, 2008. Over 200 skiers attended. Chairs one and two were operational largely due to the efforts of a few dedicated locals who dug through ice and dirt to clear the loading zones. Chair three was still being dug out from recent snowfall. The Metcalfs, other owners, and press were in attendance, as well as former owner Lynn Newcomb Jr. The resort operated for approximately five weeks on a limited, weekend schedule (Saturdays and Sundays), closing in mid-March 2008. The snowpack had melted to patches by mid-May, only to revive in a Memorial Day weekend storm that left over two feet of snow.

== 2008–2009 season ==
Mount Waterman operated during the 2008/2009 ski season with all three lifts running, and the resort received over 3 feet of snow in December 2008. Conditions throughout the season were variable due to warm weather patterns and winter rain, and the resort usually operated on a Friday-Sunday schedule from December 21 - January 12, then again from February 13 - March 15. Resort facilities received improvements, highlighted by the re-opening of the lodge.

== Station Fire ==
The Station Fire (2009) exploded out of control on August 29–30, 2009, and was visible to Mount Waterman caretaker Todd Brugger several miles west of the ski area. Phone service was lost early in the fire, so Brugger had to respond on his own. After seeing smoke coming from Devil's Canyon directly behind the ski area, he took a bulldozer up to the ridgeline and dumped some dirt off the back to form a firebreak. On September 5, 2009 the fire reached Devil's Canyon close to Todd's firebreak. The smoke reduced visibility to 10–20 ft (3.0–6.1 m), but the fire never crossed the ridge into the ski area. In the Winston side country west of the ski area, the fire crossed the ridge and burned some ground cover but not the forest. On September 6, 2009 firefighters finally arrived on the scene, deploying a plane with fire retardant. The Station Fire's most serious impact upon Mount Waterman was the closure of the Angeles Crest Highway above La Cañada for all of the 2009–10 and 2010-11 ski seasons.

== 2009–2010 and later seasons ==
- 2009-2010: Mount Waterman had enough snow for skiing by late January 2010 but no road access. An alternate route through Big Tujunga Canyon was finally opened in March 2010, so Mount Waterman operated on its Friday-Sunday schedule from March 13–April 18.
- 2010-2011: In 2011, Mount Waterman was again accessible via the Big Tujunga route. It was open the first two weekends of January, then Friday-Sunday from February 27–April 3, except for the third weekend of March when there was too much snow for the road to be plowed.
- 2011-2015: The Angeles Crest Highway above La Canada Flintridge finally reopened in May 2011, restoring normal road access to Mount Waterman. However, for the 2011–12, 2012–13, 2013–14 and 2014–15 seasons, natural snowfall was inadequate to open the ski area for business. The multi-year drought was unprecedented in the 70+ years of the ski area's history; it had never been closed previously for more than two consecutive seasons. Todd Brugger left Mt. Waterman after the summer of 2014. Having no onsite caretaker has contributed to delayed openings in subsequent seasons.
- 2015-2016: Mt. Waterman was open weekends from Jan. 16 - Feb. 6.
- 2016-2017: Mt. Waterman was open weekends from Jan. 28 - Mar. 12.
- 2017-2018: This year was another severe drought season, so Mt. Waterman never opened.
- 2018-2019: Mt. Waterman was open the weekend of Feb. 23-24, 2019 and the last three weekends of March 2019. Road damage prevented Mt. Waterman from being open Feb. 9-10, 2019, and a detour via Upper Big Tujunga was required to reach the area during the later open weekends.
- 2019-2020: Mt. Waterman received adequate snow from the Christmas 2019 storm, but its road was closed for several days and there were further equipment delays. It opened for the last two weekends of January 2020, but then closed. Due to the COVID-19 pandemic there was no possibility of running lifts after the March or April storms. Mt. Waterman and the upper Angeles Crest was quite active with backcountry skiers after the April 6–10, 2020 storm until a heat wave hit a week and a half later.
- 2020-2021: Mt. Waterman did not open in 2020-21 because Hwy 2 was closed for Bobcat Fire cleanup. The fires also damaged the phone lines to the ski area. Since there has been no onsite caretaker since 2014, the status of the required phone landline (there is usually no cell service) is not monitored aside from when temporary employees show up to clear snow. It is unknown whether the Forest Service would permit Mt. Waterman to operate without the landline, perhaps using a satellite phone or Starlink for emergency communications.
- 2021-2022: Mt. Waterman's road was closed for a week after the December 2021 storms, and it did not have staff and equipment ready until February 2022, when snowpack was inadequate to open.
- 2022-2023: Mt. Waterman did not have enough snow to open until 8+ feet fell in late February 2023, but for several weeks thereafter, Angeles Crest Highway was not plowed, and it was damaged by additional storms in March 2023. The Angeles Crest Highway reopened via upper Big Tujunga in October 2023.
- 2023-2024: Mt. Waterman suffered from minimal snowfall until 5–7 feet fell during the first week of February 2024. However, Angeles Crest Hwy did not open until Feb. 21, 2024. Further delays were due to lifts being dug out and the phone lines being fixed. This was Mt. Waterman's first attempt to open since the 2020 Bobcat Fire, so the phone line was probably not being monitored. Mt. Waterman opened for the first time in over four years on March 16, 2024, operating on Saturday and Sunday for two weekends. After this, the lifts only spun once a week, either on Saturday or Sunday due to not having enough employees after years of closures, and because March 31 was Easter Sunday. Mt. Waterman was open Saturday April 6 and finally Sunday, April 14 after being closed April 13 due to stormy weather. Only chairs 1 and 2 spun, as they did not have enough staff, and/or mechanical problems prohibited often closed chair 3 from running.
- 2024-2026: These were two more severe drought seasons, so Mt. Waterman never opened. This makes 11 seasons out of the past 20 that Mt. Waterman never opened.

== Facilities ==
Mount Waterman facilities include: a ticket booth at the base at 6,900 ft (2,100 m), a warming hut, restrooms, a ski school, ski patrol (first aid), a ski rental service (currently inactive), and a heliport halfway up the mountain. Near the top there is a 5 million gallon, tadpole-filled reservoir intended for a future snowmaking system, and at the 8,036 ft (2,449 m) summit there is a plateau with large boulders. Waterman has three double chairlifts to serve its ski trails. Mount Waterman currently has no snowmaking equipment. There are steep backcountry ski trails on the east and northwest sides of the mountain, though skiing these trails is not recommended since the area is not patrolled. During heavy El Niño snowfall in 1998 the County Sheriff ticketed some backcountry skiers who entered these areas. Several skiers and snowboarders went missing and had to be rescued that year.

== Mt. Waterman For Sale Summer 2024 ==
- In 2024, it was announced that Rick Metcalf was in the process of selling a 20-year transferable permit, and all the facilities to a group of investors called Angeles Mountain Partners LLC for $2.275 million. One of the investors, Joshua Shelton, said they had plans to add snowmaking for the first time ever, possible chairlift upgrades and a new chairlift, facility upgrades including "glamping cabins," and summer bike trails. To do this, the investors planned on selling memberships called "The Waterman100." A membership would cost $100,000 and would give members private access to the ski runs and "first dibs" when snow fell. A membership also included planned helicopter transport up to Waterman, since Cal Trans often was not plowing the road promptly after a snowstorm, or there was road damage that was not being repaired promptly either. The improvements and "privatization" plans had to be approved by the U.S. Forest Service, and upon hearing about these plans, an anonymous Forest Service employee said that "fully or partially privatizing Mt. Waterman, which is on public land under a permit, is extremely 'problematic.'"

As of February 2025, Mt. Waterman's website and Facebook page have not been updated with any news on opening, or of any new plans approved. Supposedly the deal was "pending" for months, and possibly fell out of Escrow, due to a lack of "Waterman100" memberships sold.

== Death of Waterman investor/owner Rick Metcalf ==
In late January 2025, stories began to circulate that Waterman owner Richard (Rick) Metcalf was killed in Adelanto, California returning from a ski trip to Mammoth Mountain. The Victor Valley News confirmed later that on January 17, 2025, Metcalf was walking in the crosswalk at 7:20 p.m. in darkness, and a large white Cadillac Escalade hit and killed him instantly. Metcalf was 61-years-old. Metcalf's death occurred almost exactly 20 years after previous owner Barry Stubblefield was killed on January 21, 2005 after hitting a tree while skiing on Waterman.

== December 2025 Landslide ==
Major storms December 24-26, 2025 rained far above the top of Southern California's ski areas. A landslide on Mt. Waterman's steep face partially buried the base of chair 1, undermined the Angeles Crest Hwy below the lift and destroyed most of the parking area there. This was documented by an ABC7 helicopter on December 31, 2025 https://www.youtube.com/watch?v=K5GzPd0UiNg

As of June 8, 2026 there was no mention of the landslide on Mt. Waterman's website, Facebook page or the "Waterman100" website. The road damage alone will require several months of repair. There is no information regarding degree of damage to chair 1. An L.A. Times writer hiked past Mt. Waterman to Buckhorn Campground in May 2026 to inspect the extensive road damage. https://www.latimes.com/travel/newsletter/2026-05-21/the-wild-los-angeles-angeles-crest-highway-damage-2026

== Mt. Waterman For Sale October 2026 ==
- In October 2026, Mt. Waterman was again offered for sale, this time for $3.275 million, after the Waterman100 plan fell through. https://unofficialnetworks.com/2026/10/22/for-sale-southern-california-ski-resort-hits-the-market-after-private-club-plan-fails-3-275-million/ An embedded video link describes the Chair 1 damage as "The landslide destabilized chair 1's counterweight, causing a detensioning." Caltrans has yet to estimate when the road may reopen.

== See also ==
- Angeles National Forest
- Buckhorn Ski Club
- Kratka Ridge
- San Gabriel Mountains National Monument
