= Buckhorn Ski Club =

Club in Southern California, United States

Buckhorn Ski and Snowboard Club
- Location in California Buckhorn Ski and Snowboard Club (the United States)
- Location: Waterman Mountain; San Gabriel Mountains; Angeles National Forest
- Nearest city: Azusa, California
- Coordinates: 34.34457°N 117.91437°W
- Vertical: 680 ft (210 m)
- Top elevation: 7,903 ft (2,409 m)
- Base elevation: 7,203 ft (2,195 m)
- Skiable area: 40 acres (16 ha)
- Trails: 5
- Lift system: 2 surface lifts
- Snowfall: 180 in (460 cm)
- Snowmaking: None
- Night skiing: None

Buckhorn Ski and Snowboard Club is located roughly 40 mi (64 km) north of Los Angeles in the Angeles National Forest. The U.S. Department of Agriculture owns the land and the United States Forest Service administers the area. It is a cooperative club with nominal dues but all members are expected to contribute time to maintenance.

== History ==
After World War II, skiing as a group operation began with the assembly of neighborhood ski clubs. These clubs constructed rope tows and warming huts. Buckhorn Ski Club is the last remaining club-owned self operated ski facility in California. In 1948, the Santa Monica Ski Club and the G. Pepperdine Ski Club obtained permits to build two rope tows and rope tow sheds. A few years later, the same group built the lodge and the out house. In 1958, the club incorporated as the Whittier Ski Club and combined with the Santa Monica Ski Club. In 1984, the club changed its name to Buckhorn Ski Club and later to Buckhorn Ski and Snowboard Club.

In February 2005, a huge snow storm dropped 8 ft (2.4 m) of snow. This resulted in the lodge's roof collapsing. The club members rallied to shovel the snow off the roof and protect the lodge. Over the summer the club members re-built the roof to current construction standards.

== Facilities ==
The lodge itself is intact after being built in the early 1950s. It is Alpine style with a gable roof and encompasses about 800 sq ft (74 m^{2}). The wood frame lodge has shiplap siding and a deck with custom balcony trim. The interior includes a great room with a chimney, kitchen, pantry, and utility room. The rope tows are no longer operable, the drive apparatus can still operate with a Chrysler Spitfire truck engine and a Waukesha tractor engine.

== Activities ==
Downhill skiing is the central focus with over 40 acres (16 ha) of terrain with a 680 ft (210 m) vertical drop. Snowboarding is also allowed on both the Big Hill and the Bunny Hill. Snowboarders usually find it harder than skiers to use the rope tows because it is harder to maintain balance. Skis, for cross-country skiing, and snowshoes are available for use at the lodge.

The club has several annual on-hill and off-hill events. A popular "Wine in the Pines" wine tasting event is held in September and the club goes white water rafting on the Kern River in June.

== See also ==
- Mount Waterman Ski Resort
- Kratka Ridge
