= San Bernardino Forest Reserve =

Former forest reserve of the United States

The San Bernardino Forest Reserve was established by the United States General Land Office in California on February 25, 1893 with 737,280 acres (2,983.7 km^{2}) in the San Bernardino Mountains. After the transfer of federal forests to the U.S. Forest Service in 1905, it became a National Forest on March 4, 1907. On July 1, 1908 the entire forest was combined with San Gabriel National Forest and Santa Barbara National Forest to create Angeles National Forest, and the name was discontinued. On September 30, 1925 San Bernardino National Forest was re-established from parts of Angeles and Cleveland National Forest.

The reserve was the fourth one established in the state and was created on the same day as the Trabuco Canyon Reserve. And, like the other reserves, the San Bernardino Reserve's purpose was the protection of watersheds and water resources. It was bordered by the San Gabriel Reserve on the east at Cajon Pass and extended over all of the San Bernardino Mountains to the Mojave Desert.
