= Ammonitella =

Scientific classification
- Kingdom: Animalia
- Phylum: Mollusca
- Class: Gastropoda
- Order: Stylommatophora
- Family: Megomphicidae
- Genus: Ammonitella; J.G. Cooper, 1868

Genus of gastropods

Ammonite

Ammonitella is a genus of small, air-breathing land snails, terrestrial pulmonate gastropod molluscs in the family Megomphicidae.

== Species ==
Species within the genus Ammonitella include:

- Ammonitella yatesii
- †Ammonitella lunala
