= Jackson Lake (California) =

Sag pond in Los Angeles County, California

- Jackson Lake in 2025
- Location: Los Angeles County, California
- Coordinates: 34.3921°N 117.7265°W
- Type: Sag Pond
- Surface elevation: Approx 6,000 ft (1,829 m)

Location
- Interactive map of Jackson Lake

Jackson Lake is located in the Angeles National Forest in Los Angeles County, California, at an approximate elevation of 6,000 feet (1,800 m). The lake is located in a day-use area in the San Gabriel Mountains National Monument. Jackson Lake is located on the USGS 7.5 minute quadrangle map entitled "Mescal Creek".

Jackson Lake is a sag pond located on the San Andreas Fault, a strike slip fault that runs the length of California. Sag ponds are created when the fault action creates a depression in the land where rainwater or snowmelt can collect. The sag pond for Jackson Lake consists mostly of snowmelt from the San Gabriel Mountains.

Jackson Lake has been the site of drownings due to the thin ice which can cover the top portion of the lake in colder months but may not be strong enough to support human weight.

Popular activities for the lake area include fishing, swimming, picnicking, and kayaking.
