= Mount Lukens =

Mountain in southern California, United States

- Sister Elsie Peak
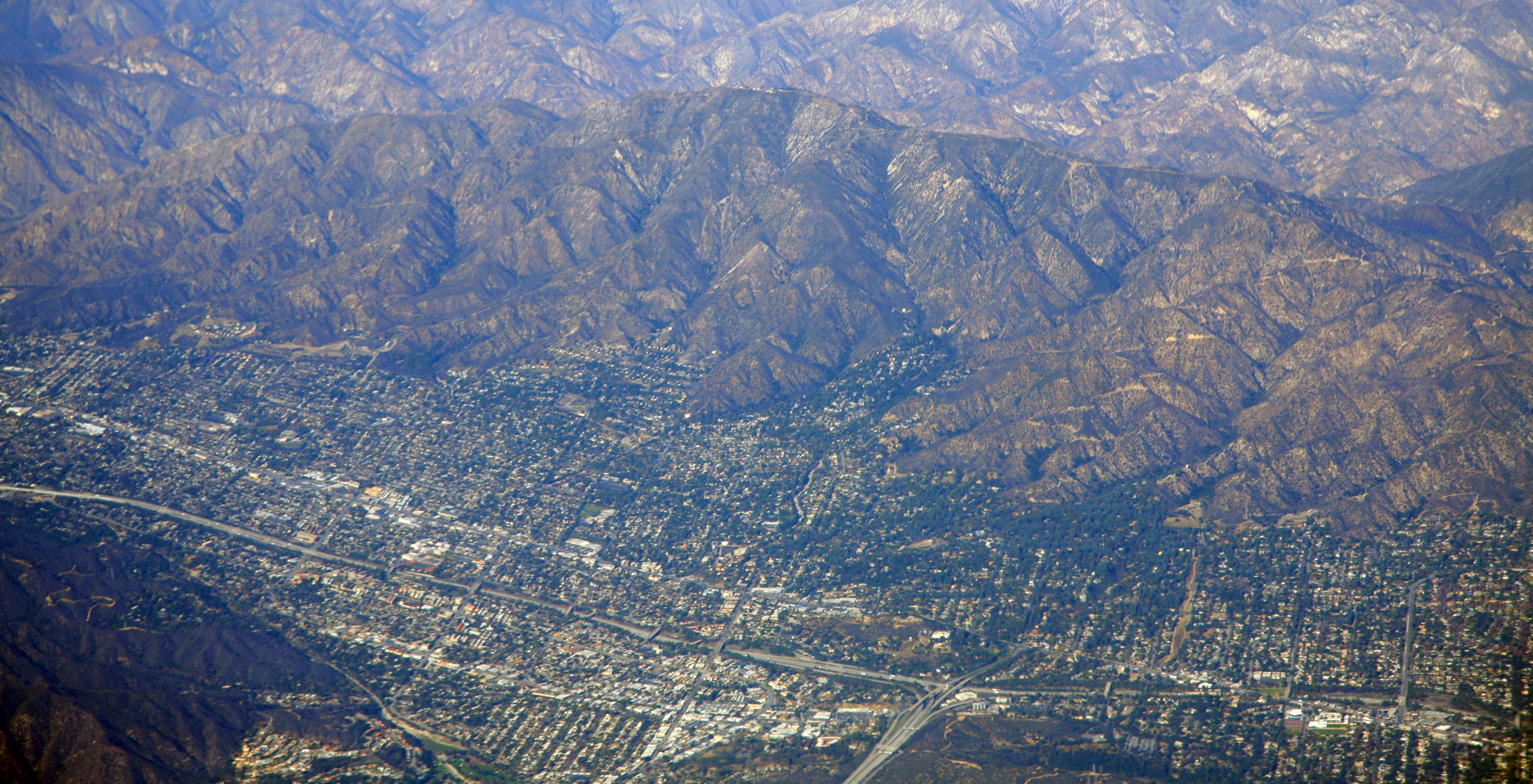
- Mt. Lukens overlooking La Crescenta-Montrose

Highest point
- Elevation: 5,075 ft (1,547 m) NAVD 88
- Prominence: 1,794 ft (547 m)
- Listing: Hundred Peaks Section
- Coordinates: 34°16′08″N 118°14′20″W

Geography
- Location within the Los Angeles metropolitan area Location within California Location within the United States
- Location: Sunland-Tujunga, Los Angeles, Los Angeles County, California, U.S.
- Parent range: San Gabriel Mountains
- Topo map: USGS Condor Peak

Climbing
- Easiest route: Hike from Deukmejian Wilderness Park in Crescenta Highlands, Glendale

Mount Lukens is a mountain peak of the San Gabriel Mountains, in Los Angeles County, California. It is the highest point in the city of Los Angeles.

== Geography ==
It is in the Sunland-Tujunga community within the northeast corner of the city of Los Angeles, above the Crescenta Valley. The summit, at 5,075 feet (1,547 m) in elevation, is the highest point within the city limits. The summit's elevation makes Los Angeles the city with the largest difference between high and low points among the 50 most populous cities in the US.

Because of its location, prominence, and proximity to Los Angeles, the summit is dotted with television, radio, and cellular transmission towers. The mountain is also within the boundaries of the Angeles National Forest and Los Angeles County.

== Name origin ==
The mountain was named after Theodore Lukens, a former supervisor of the Angeles National Forest and later, the mayor of Pasadena, California. Previously, the mountain was known as Sister Elsie Peak. It has been said that she was a Catholic nun who died while caring for the sick during a smallpox epidemic. On the USFS map of 1925, the mountain was shown as Mount Lukens and subtitled Sister Elsie Peak. The identity of Sister Elsie (also referred to as Sister Else) is not certain and the stories surrounding her have not been verified.

== 2009 Station Fire ==
Mount Lukens is in an area that was affected by the 2009 Station Fire in the San Gabriel Mountains.

== Radio communication facilities ==
Mount Lukens is a radio site with buildings owned by American Tower, Crown Castle, Mobile Relay Associates, among others.

This site provides excellent coverage of Los Angeles, San Fernando Valley, Orange County and parts of Riverside and San Bernardino areas. It houses both broadcast and two-way communications facilities on virtually every frequency band, including FM broadcast, VHF low- and high-band, UHF, 800/900 MHz, and microwave.

== See also ==
- San Gabriel Mountains National Monument
- Lukens Lake
