= Kratka Ridge =

Ski resort in San Gabriel Mountains, California

Coordinates: 34.35159°N 117.89716°W

Kratka Ridge or Snowcrest is a skiable area on Waterman Mountain in the San Gabriel Mountains of Los Angeles County, California. Located 36 miles northeast of La Cañada and Pasadena along the Angeles Crest Highway, it reaches a height of 7,515 feet (2,291 m).

The area had two chair lifts and a rope tow and has a total of 13 runs with a vertical drop of approximately 750 feet (230 m).

Trail difficulty can be rated as 30% beginner, 30% intermediate and 40% advanced.

The resort is located 4.2 miles (6.8 km) west of Angeles Crest Highway mile marker 52.6, about 2.7 miles (4.3 km) east of Mount Waterman ski area, and about 2.7 miles west of the two tunnels. It is in the Pearblossom, California postal zip code (93553).

== History ==
The area was developed in 1950 by the Joe Diener and the Angeles Winter Development Association, a group of Mount San Gorgonio ski club members. In 1954, the first chairlift at Kratka Ridge was constructed. Its single chair was believed to be one of the last of its kind in operation in 2001 apart from the single chair at Mad River Glen and Mount Eyak Ski Area in Cordova, Alaska.

During the 1980s and early 1990s, the Hensley family owned the majority interest in the ski area. Ray Hensley, a former college and professional ski racer, was the mountain manager. His father, Ed, often worked the grill in the basement beer garden below the bottom of Chair 1. They sold the ski area to John and Jacqueline Steely.

Kratka Ridge changed its name to Snowcrest, then back to Kratka Ridge. After the switch back to the original name, "Kratka" referred to the skiing and snowboarding terrain from the base to the summit, while "Snowcrest" referred to the snowplay/tubing area at the base.

On August 29, 1999, five teenagers crashed a Toyota Camry off Angeles Crest Highway (mile marker 68) when driving home from a Jujubeats "rave" party held at the then-named Snowcrest Resort. The families of the teens took legal actions to sue the venue owners but the disputes were settled out of court. This event may have contributed to a bad image of Snowcrest, prompting the owners to change the name back to Kratka Ridge.

The base of the single-chair chairlift in June 2015.

In 1999, an investor group led by Barry Stubblefield bought Kratka Ridge and Mt. Waterman, with plans to link them. However, the limited number of visitors delayed the expansion. The ski areas closed to the public, and then Stubblefield was killed in 2005 while skiing Mt. Waterman when it was closed and no ski patrol was present.

The ski area was open during the 2000-2001 ski season. The single chair lift was damaged by avalanche during a large storm during February 11–13, 2001, which left approximately 7 feet of snow. In December 2001, a mysterious fire destroyed the chairlift base area and the resort has been closed since. The parent owner of the resort, Angeles Crest Resorts, collected insurance on both events but did not begin reconstruction. The ski area's closure may have been related to the fire or other economic reasons.

The permit for Kratka Ridge was revoked and the current owners had to sell it or the resort would be torn down. Another local resort, Mountain High, showed interest in buying the lift structures, probably for its new North Resort.

On March 12, 2006, the Pasadena Star reported that Lynn Newcomb and Rick Metcalf, a Southern California businessman, wanted to purchase Mt. Waterman from the existing owners, including Barry Stubblefield's widow. The former manager for Mount Waterman under Lynn Newcomb later reported that Lynn Newcomb and Rick Metcalf purchased the resort and planned to have it open by the 2006-2007 winter season. Reconstruction of the chairlift base area was under way in October 2006. Plans for the area were not certain, however, as many speculated it to be a play area while neighboring Mt. Waterman hosted ski lifts.

As of April 2020, the area remains unchanged and abandoned. The single-chair chairlift is still intact yet the base of the station is non-existent. "Keep Out" signs are posted alongside the highway.

== See also ==
- Angeles National Forest
- San Gabriel Mountains National Monument
