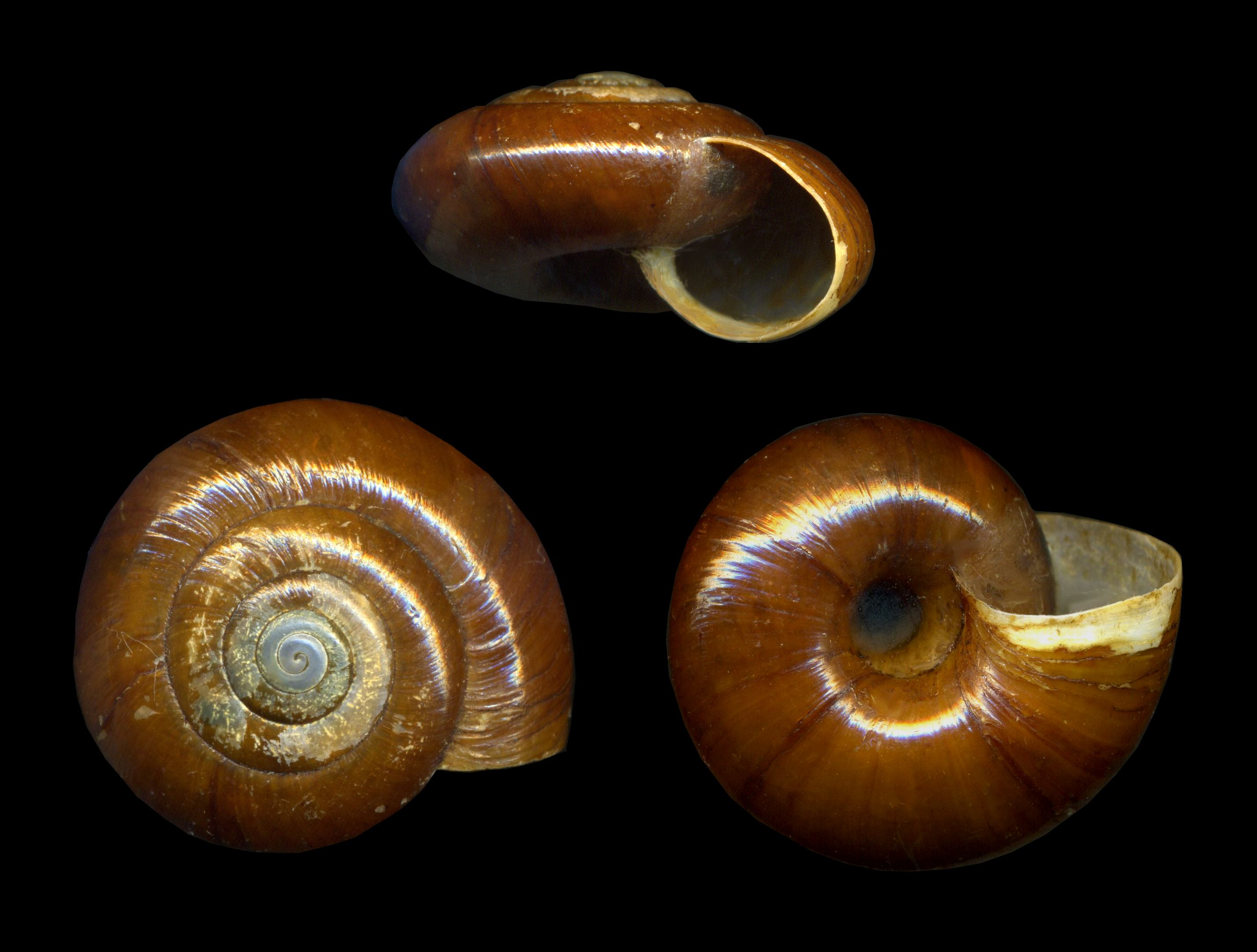
- Three views of a shell of Glyptostoma gabrielense

Scientific classification
- Kingdom: Animalia
- Phylum: Mollusca
- Class: Gastropoda
- Order: Stylommatophora
- Family: Megomphicidae
- Genus: Glyptostoma; Bland & Binney, 1873

= Glyptostoma =

Genus of gastropods

Glyptostoma is a genus of air-breathing land snails, terrestrial pulmonate gastropod mollusks in the family Megomphicidae.

These are large (to about 40 mm or 1.5 inches in diameter) dark brown snails, much shorter than wide. They are found in hilly areas, or low mountains, along the Pacific coast of North America, from California to Baja California.

== Species ==
Species and subspecies within the genus Glyptostoma include:

- Glyptostoma gabrielense Pilsbry, 1938
- Glyptostoma newberryanum (Binney, 1858)
  - Glyptostoma newberryanum depressum Byant, 1902
