= San Gabriel Wilderness =

Protected wilderness area in California, United States

- IUCN category Ib (wilderness area)
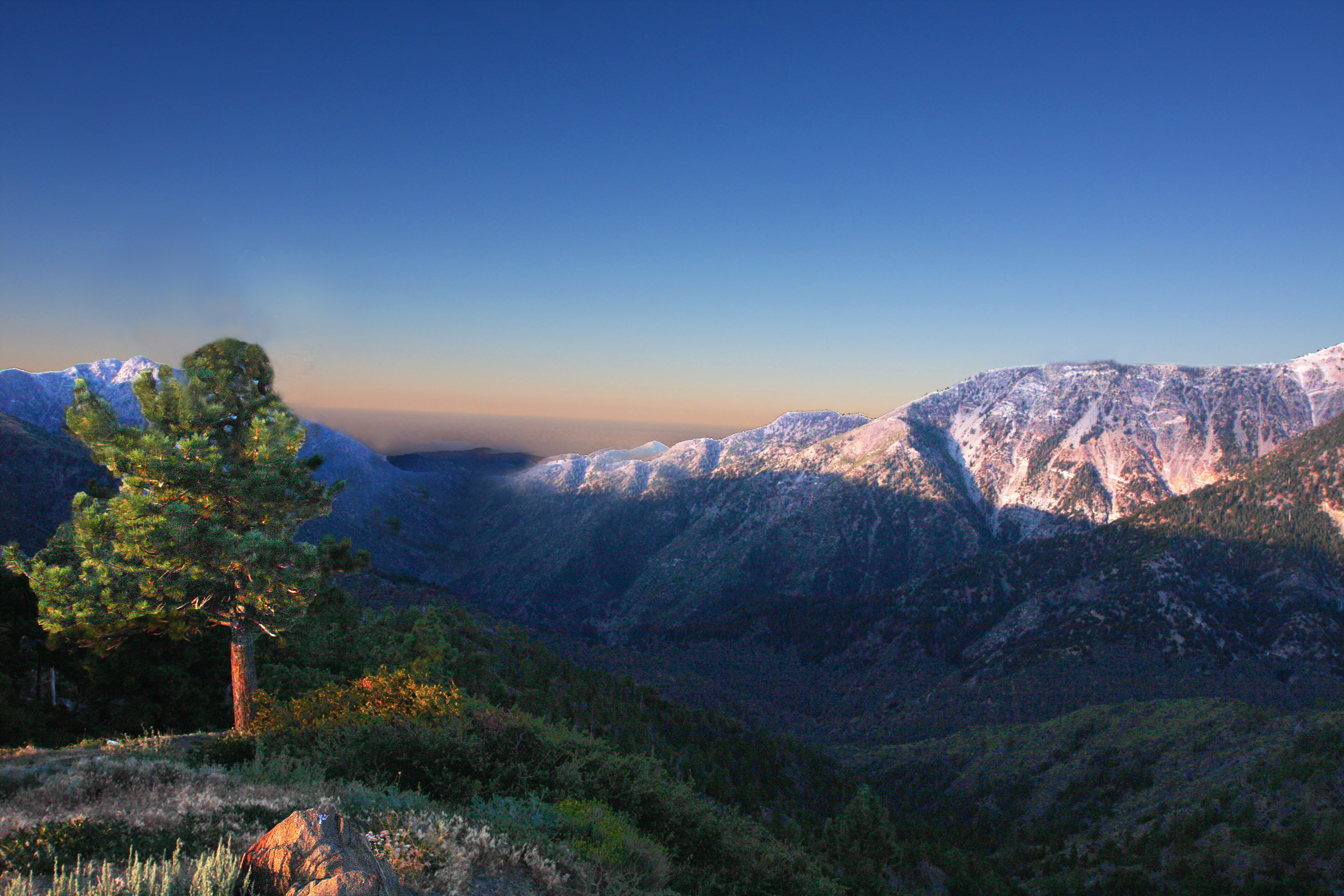
- Looking into the San Gabriel Wilderness with the San Gabriel Valley in the distance

- Location within the Los Angeles metropolitan area Location within California Location within the United States
- Interactive map of San Gabriel Wilderness
- Location: Los Angeles County, California, United States
- Nearest city: Pasadena, California
- Coordinates: 34°14′48″N 117°59′08″W
- Area: 36,118 acres (146.16 km^{2})
- Established: 1968
- Governing body: U.S. Forest Service

The San Gabriel Wilderness is a wilderness area created in 1968 of more than 36,118 acres (150 km^{2}) within the Angeles National Forest and San Gabriel Mountains National Monument.

The area lies on the southern slopes of the San Gabriel Mountains, between the Angeles Crest and the West Fork of the San Gabriel River.

The area was originally set aside as the Devils Canyon-Bear Canyon Primitive Area of 35,000 acres (140 km^{2}).

The San Gabriel Mountains were first preserved by the federal government in 1892 as the San Gabriel Timberland Reserve, established by U.S. President Benjamin Harrison and influenced by California conservationists, Abbot Kinney and John Muir. This forest reserve would later become part of the Angeles National Forest in which the San Gabriel Wilderness is now located.

== Recreation ==
Permits are not required to enter the San Gabriel wilderness.

=== Access trails ===
The following trails provide access:

- Bear Creek Trail - This trail is approximately 11 miles (18 km) long, one trailhead for Lower Bear Creek located one mile (1.6 km) West along West Fork Road (which branches off of Highway 39 before mile marker 28) and the other trailhead for Upper Bear Creek located at the Valley of the Moon parking lot along Highway 39 at approximately mile post 29.65. The trail crosses Smith Mountain Saddle, entering into the Designated Wilderness West past the Saddle peak.
- Mt. Waterman Trail - A ten-mile (16 km) trail, from Three Points to Buckhorn, with a one-mile (1.6 km) side trail to Twin Peaks Saddle.
- Devil's Canyon Trail - A four-mile (6 km) trail down into rugged Devil's Canyon.

==== Hiking Trails within the Wilderness Area ====
San Gabriel Designated Wilderness Boundary at Smith Mountain Saddle.

Hiking trails in the Designated Wilderness are built and maintained utilizing hand tools and materials which are strictly limited in terms of environmental impact. The use of chainsaws to remove trees that are down across trails is prohibited, requiring the use of crosscut saws, block-and-tackle chains and ropes to pull trees off of trails, griphoists, and other mechanical tools which do not produce noise or petroleum-based pollutants.

In addition, wheeled tools and equipment are not permitted to be used in the Designated Wilderness, neither for trail maintenance nor for recreation, causing the wilderness to be classified for pedestrian and equestrian use only with mountain biking prohibited. Blasting to remove rock outcrops is prohibited, as is the use of fire-fighting tools like tractors, Phos-Chek air drops, Tovex Firebreak II explosives, and chainsaws to cut fire lines. Everything must be done by hand, even when fighting fires within the Designated Wilderness.

The people who maintain hiking trails within the San Gabriel Designated Wilderness attempt to achieve a passable hiking experience within the wilderness that does not appear to be too greatly unnatural. To achieve such an effect, tree limbs and branches that must be cut back are finished with an effort to appear natural, bucked tree trunks that are removed from the trail are relocated so that they appear at a distance and do not look to have been cut by people, and even sawdust from crosscut saws will be collected and buried off of the trail.
