= Theodore Lukens =

American conservationist and civic leader (1848–1918)

Theodore Parker Lukens
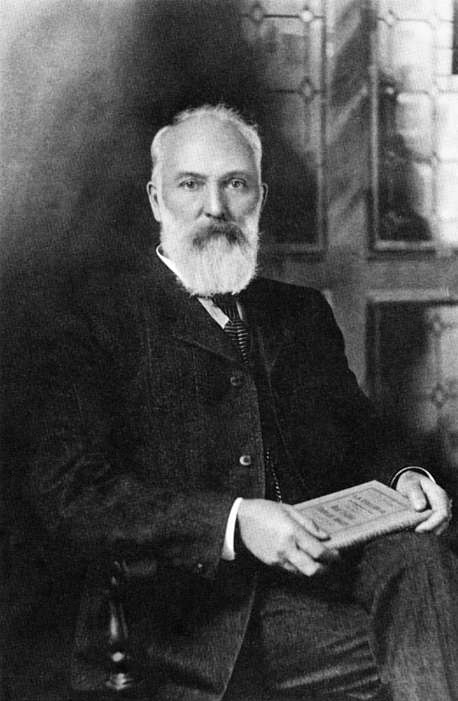
- Lukens c. 1890

4th Mayor of Pasadena
- In office May 1890 – May 1892
- Preceded by: Amos G. Throop
- Succeeded by: Oscar F. Weed

6th Mayor of Pasadena
- In office May 1894 – December 1895
- Preceded by: Oscar F. Weed
- Succeeded by: John S. Cox

Personal details
- Born: October 6, 1848 New Concord, Ohio
- Died: July 1, 1918 (aged 69) Pasadena, California
- Party: Republican
- Spouse(s): Charlotte Dyer (1871 - 1905), H. Sibyl Swett (1906 - 1918)
- Children: Helen Lukens Gaut (m. Feb.19, 1906 - James H. Gaut)
- Parent(s): William E. Lukens, Margaret Cooper
- Profession: Forester, conservationist

Theodore Parker Lukens (October 6, 1848 – July 1, 1918) was an American conservationist, real estate investor, civic leader, and forester who believed that burned over mountains could again be covered in timber which would protect watersheds. Lukens collected pine cones and seeds of different types and conducted experimental plantings on the mountain slopes above Pasadena, California. His perseverance earned him the name "Father of Forestry."

Lukens established Henninger Flats tree nursery, which provided seed stock for an estimated 70,000 trees. He worked for the United States Forest Service and was acting supervisor of the San Gabriel Timberland Reserve and the San Bernardino Forest Reserve in 1906.

Lukens served two terms as mayor of Pasadena and was active in municipal and civic affairs of early-day Pasadena. Prior to becoming mayor, Lukens was involved in an anti-Chinese movement that culminated in racist riots against Chinese American residents and businesses in what is now Old Town Pasadena and an official ordinance barring anyone of Chinese ancestry from the city. Lukens remained prominent in civic and conservation issues until his death in 1918.

== Reforestation ==
Lukens was interested in growing plants, even before moving out to Southern California from Illinois, where he had owned and operated a nursery in Whiteside County, Illinois. By 1882 the Lukens family established a home in Pasadena. Lukens already knew of the hardwoods in his native Midwest but now the former nurseryman sought to learn about the native and non-native trees of Southern California. Among them: live oak, pepper, camphor, umbrella, eucalyptus and various citrus trees.

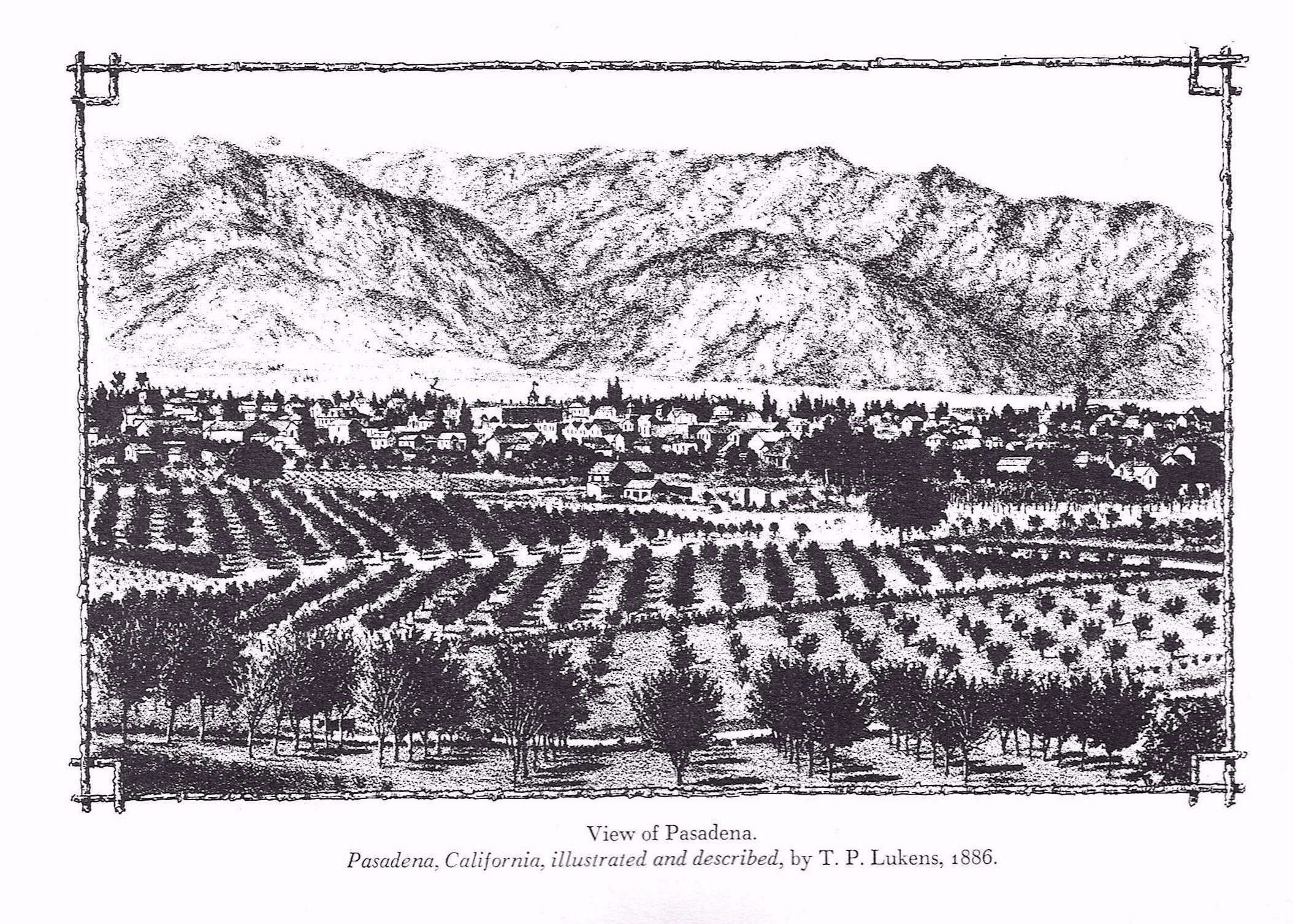
Cover of Pasadena, California, Illustrated and Described

Lukens undertook several expeditions to study the San Gabriel and San Bernardino Mountains from 1897 to 1899. He learned the "paradise" of Southern California had some serious problems as well. The increased use and misuse of resources by miners, loggers and livestock owners had devastated the lands. Wildfires caused the worst damage due to the Mediterranean climate of long, hot and dry summers which turned fires into infernos, leaving behind burned and bare hillsides, resulting in erosion and flooding during the rainy season.

Among the different species of trees Lukens studied, the knobcone pine was the best choice he believed, for its fire-resistant properties. The cones, which are embedded in the tree, only open and release seeds after a wildfire. He learned how to open the cones by boiling them and the method of watering and care that produced seedlings. The cone is sealed by a glaze-like resin and only opens after melting from heat of at least 200 °F (93 °C). The knobcone is well suited for reforestation as it grows on rocky hillsides in serpentine or granitic soil. Botanist Willis Linn Jepson observed that the knobcone grows on sites that are the "most hopelessly inhospitable in the California mountains".

Lukens' belief in the solution of tree planting was shown by lectures he gave, as well as writings and photographs he prepared. His proposals gained support. In 1899, William Kerckhoff, president of the Forest and Water Association, paid for $50 worth of seed to give University of Southern California forestry students for planting, and in a two-week period, more than 60,000 seeds were sown by the young foresters. The next year Lukens, with support by the Forest and Water Association, planted several thousand knobcone and ponderosa pine seeds in the San Gabriel mountains above Altadena, California. Lukens' reported to the association that "ridges and crowns of hills were selected, that when the trees came into fruiting the seed would be cast in different directions down steep slopes." On a wider scale, the conservation movement was gaining momentum throughout California. In 1899, 24 organizations met in San Francisco and formed The California Society for Conserving Water and Protecting Forests. Another group formed was The Forest and Water Society of Southern California, composed of the Los Angeles Chamber of Commerce and the Southern California Academy of Science.

== Tree nursery at Henninger Flats ==
In 1903, Lukens expanded the tree-planting enterprise with a lease on the Henninger property for the US Forest Service, of which he was an employee. Chief Forester Gifford Pinchot approved the lease in October 1903 for the clearing of 5 acres (20,000 m^{2}). Reforestation became official policy. Improvements included a 48' by 60' lath house and rabbit-proof fence. The first firebreak constructed in the San Gabriel Reserve was around Henninger Flats to protect the site. Lukens worked to make Henninger Flats a high elevation tree nursery that would produce seedlings for reforestation and watershed restoration efforts.
Lukens and his assistants grew more than 60,000 experimental tree seedlings at the nursery. Most of the 1,000 trees that were planted in the San Gabriel and San Bernardino reserves for the Forest Service were grown at the nursery during 1903-1907. Locally, the nursery provided 17,000 seedlings for Los Angeles' Griffith Park, the second-largest city park in California. The nursery received many orders for seed and seedlings from foresters worldwide, including Chile and Australia. Galen Clark, former Guardian of the Yosemite Grant, approved massive tree plantings, and declared this a "grand enterprise..." in a 1904 letter to Lukens.

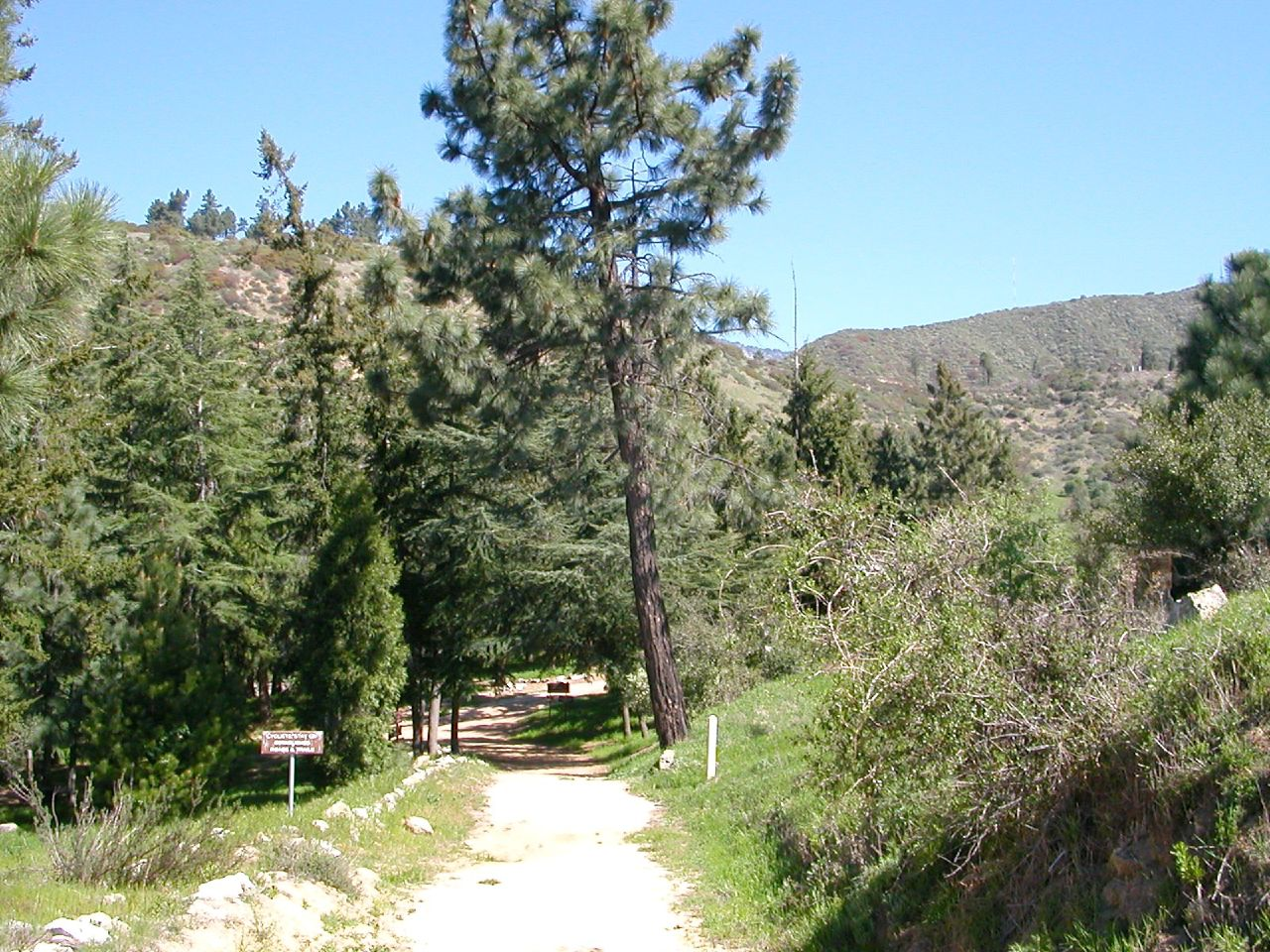
Henninger Flats entrance

In 1907, John Muir visited the tree nursery and was greatly impressed by the work done at the site. A Los Angeles Times article in June, 1912 compared Lukens to the famed Johnny Appleseed. Locally, his work at Henninger Flats was recognized when the Los Angeles County Board of Supervisors and George H. Maxwell, executive director of the National Reclamation Association, inspected the tree nursery and nearby slopes, accompanied by Lukens. Afterwards, the Pasadena Star, on June 21, 1915, reported-

"It was truthfully and justly the proudest moment of Mr. Lukens' life. His work was ranked by the speakers as among the most important for the future of Southern California and as a climax Mr. Maxwell said that in his years of travel and investigation of reclamation projects he had found none more of importance to mankind than the thing Mr. Lukens had done in solving the problem of reforestation of denuded watershed areas."

Although Lukens' work was recognized by fellow Southern Californians, the Forest Service had a different view. The Henninger Flats nursery was closed by the Forest Service in 1908 and moved to Lytle Creek. In a 'doleful' report written in 1912, the tree planting efforts on the national forest lands were deemed a failure by Assistant Chief of Silviculture T.D. Woodbury. The Forest Service's determined efforts to convert indigenous chaparral into forests fell short due to rabbits, rodents and a baking-hot sun and the project was eventually abandoned. Woodbury's report also suggested that tree planting become a research subject and recommended it be assigned to the newly established Feather River Experiment Station, located in the Plumas National Forest.

Lukens had chosen the property for good reason-he had visited the site back in 1892 along with R.J. Busch, a Los Angeles businessman, and with the owner 's permission, they started the first experimental reforestation in California on the property by planting some selected conifers there. Those selected conifers were thriving when Lukens made a return visit about ten years later.

=== History of property ===
The landowner was businessman Peter Stiel who acquired the parcel through the Homestead Act. In August, 1893, Steil then sold it to his friend William Henninger who had been living on the property since 1884.
Henninger was born in Virginia in July 1817 and was among the pioneers arriving in California in the 1800s. He was instrumental in the discovery of the first major gold strike is the San Gabriel Mountains and settled in the small hanging valley above Altadena, California. From 1884 until 1891, Henninger was the primary occupant of the 120-acre (0.49 km^{2}) site. Henninger called the flats Clara Basin in honor of a grandchild, but this name died with him. He developed the site by building a house and a cistern for water storage. After clearing the chaparral he planted hay, melons, vegetables, and fruit and nut trees, carrying the produce to town down the steep mile and a half trail he built. He claimed water rights in 1886 for domestic and irrigation use from the first canyon north of the flats.
Henninger died in 1894, and his daughters inherited the property. The property was then sold in February 1895, by auction, to Harry C. and Harriet M. Allen of Pasadena. Selling price was $2,600. In October 1895, the Allens sold the property for $5,000 to four men (W. Morgan, J. Vandevort, J. Holmes and W. Staats). These four men then sold the property in December 1895 to the Mt. Wilson Toll Road Company for $76,600. The price of this parcel had increased by 2800% in a single year. The Southern California real estate boom evidently included the mountainsides.
The property was mostly unoccupied until Lukens' second visit in 1902.
The Mt. Wilson Toll Road Company continued ownership of Henninger Flats until it was purchased by Los Angeles County in 1928. Currently, the county fire department manages the site, which is now known as the Henninger Flats Conservation Center and operates a museum, campground, and tree nursery.

== Forester ==
Lukens worked for the US Forest Service from 1900 to 1906. His first association with the agency was through Muir, who recommended him to Chief Forester Gifford Pinchot in 1899. Next, State Senator Delos Arnold, a prominent Pasadenan, recommended Lukens and by May 1, 1900, Lukens was offered the honorary position of Collaborater at $300 a year. His duties included investigative trips and he wrote detailed reports on other forests, as well as attended meetings and conventions. In 1906 he was promoted to the position of Acting Supervisor and was in charge of the San Bernardino Forest Reserve and the San Gabriel Timberland Reserve. The San Gabriel Reserve was the first federal reserve established in the state.

Lukens knew how serious the threat of wildfire was in the mountains and pushed for more firefighters, which the Forest Service granted. A joint survey by the state of California and the US Forest Service (then Bureau of Forestry) found the forest conditions in deplorable shape. Watersheds were being damaged yearly by fire, overgrazing, and land clearing. Logging had badly deteriorated the forests. The survey results produced several actions, one of which was the passage by the California legislature of the Forest Protection Act that created a State Board of Forestry with a State Forester.

Lukens hired 55 men for firefighting and other duties, but less than one year later, he was instructed to reduce the force to 25 which he found unacceptable. He wrote letters to Pinchot and influential friends in an attempt to bring political pressure to rescind the order. To complicate matters, he had requested and been granted a three-month personal leave of absence.

While Lukens was on vacation in Yosemite, Chief Pinchot transferred him from supervisor and into a "special position" with forestry extension services. The agency also made expense and payroll mistakes which cost him money, He tendered his 11-word resignation on August 12, 1906 which also ended his work at Henninger Flats.

== Conservationist ==
Lukens made several trips to Yosemite National Park, each time his interest in every aspect of nature intensified, and led to research, correspondence and interviews with experts for whom he collected various specimens and photographed specific items. Lukens joined the fledgling Sierra Club in 1894 after a visit to Yosemite and the Sierra Nevada Mountains. A self-taught photographer, he prepared albums of 100 to 150 photos of trees and mountains for friends such as Senator John Bard and Alice Eastwood, botanist at the California Academy of Sciences, among others.

One particular trip in 1895 to Yosemite's Hetch Hetchy Valley was for the sole purpose of meeting the famed conservationist John Muir, who was reported to be roaming the valley. Lukens outfitted himself at Crocker's Station, a stagecoach stop and resort, with food, two pack animals and Elwell the guide. A few miles south of the valley, he came across a man wearing a rumpled suit, vest, white shirt; without food, pack animals or companions.

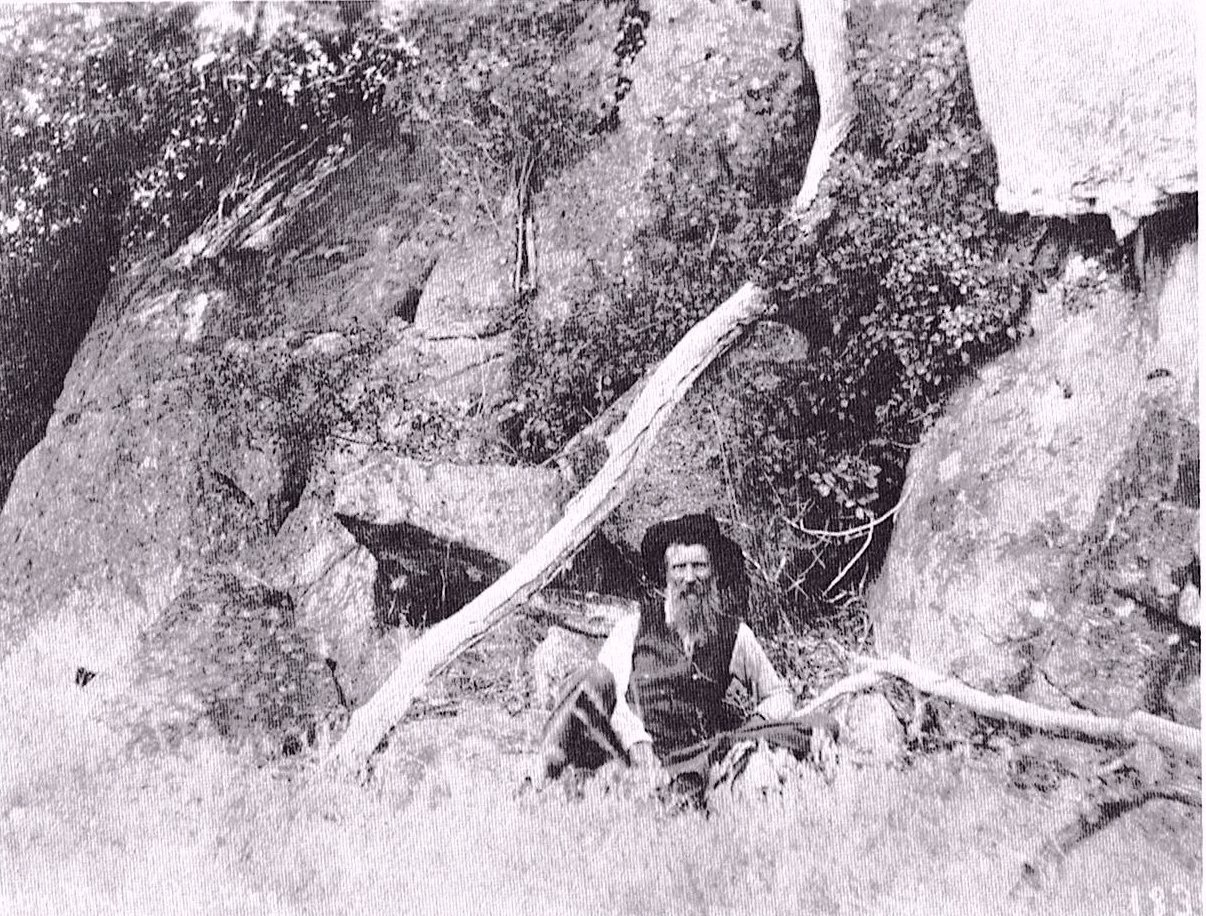
Muir, photographed by T.P. Lukens, 1895

He was indeed Muir, and Lukens persuaded him to join his well-stocked entourage and they headed back to Hetch Hetchy Valley, but only after Lukens took a photo to memorialize the event. The photograph is titled "John Muir Resting". The two men discussed topics on forest preservation, as well as watershed restoration and Southern California wildfires. Muir was familiar with Southern California, having visited and climbed there in 1887.

Lukens and Muir discovered that they shared a friend: Jeanne Smith Carr. Her husband, Dr. Ezra Carr had been Muir's professor in Natural Science at the State University of Wisconsin. The Carrs had moved to Pasadena in the 1880s. Lukens was on several Pasadena committees with Jeanne Carr and shared an interest in tree-growing. As the two mountaineers, Muir and Lukens, explored the area, Lukens studied pine trees, soil types and growth habits, noticed height and age, and as always, collected pine cones and absorbed Muir's essays on conifers.

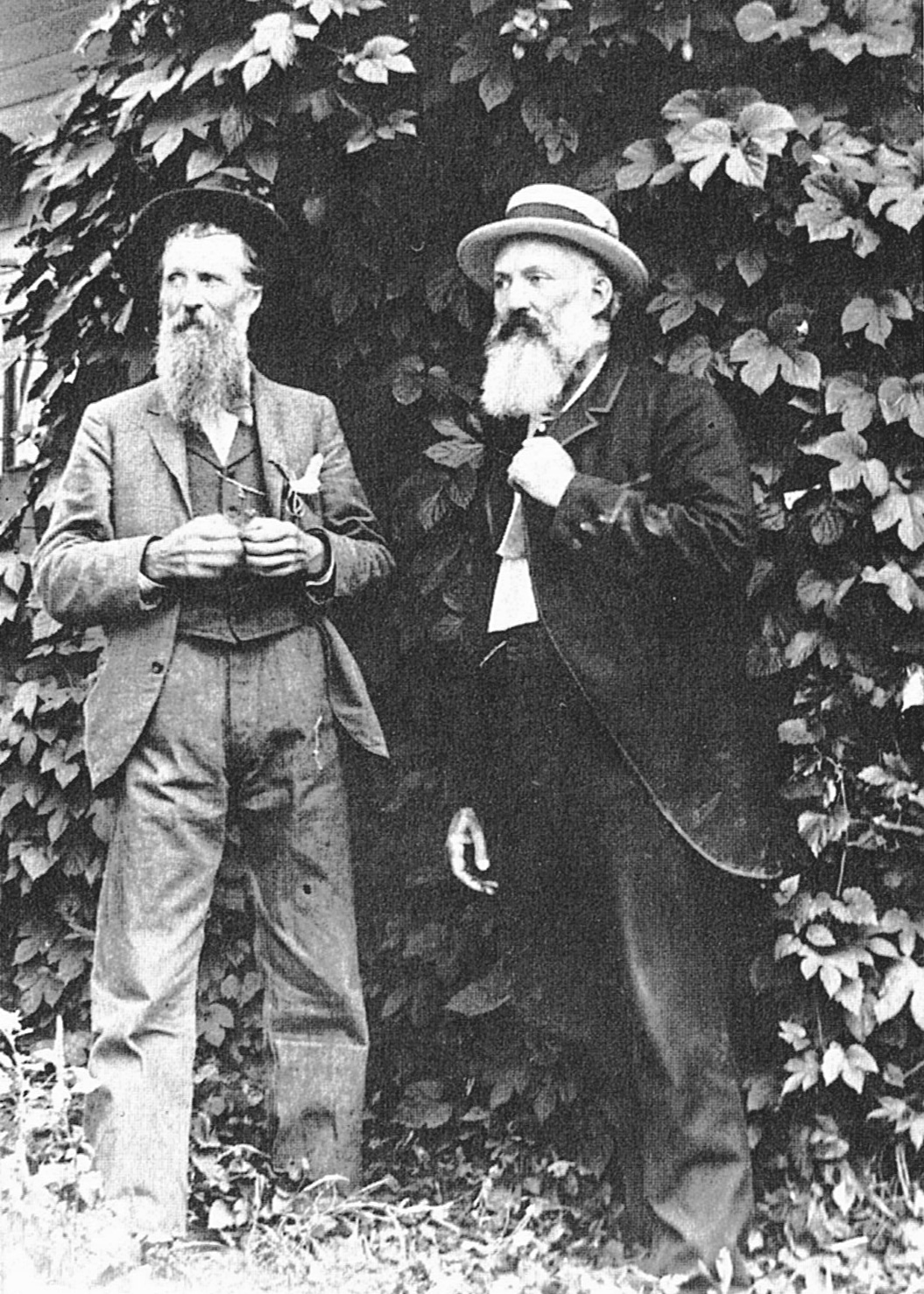
Muir with Lukens at Crocker's Station, 1895

The sugar pine was Muir's favorite, which he described as "surpassing all others, not merely in size but in lordly beauty and majesty." The sugar pine is the largest and tallest pine of the pine trees with recorded heights exceeding 200 feet (61 m), and has the longest cones, up to 24 inches (610 mm) in length. During the last week of the trip, they camped at Tenaya Lake, where they met Gertrude Towne and Nellie Anderson and their mule, Plumduff. Muir and Lukens led the intrepid adventuresses up Mt. Conness to the summit at 12,566 feet (3,830 m) where Miss Towne drew sketches of the distinctive peak. Mount Dana, elevation 13,052 feet (3,978 m), was climbed the next day by the group before Muir had to return home to Martinez. Muir sent Lukems a copy of Picturesque California, volume II with a note to read Jeanne Carr's chapter on Los Angeles County. Lukens and Muir maintained a friendship until Muir's death in 1914.

=== Sierra Club ===
At Muir's urging, Lukens became actively involved in several Sierra Club campaigns: to purchase privately held toll roads for public use into Yosemite National Park, and to protect Hetch Hetchy Valley in Yosemite.

John Muir, now president of the Sierra Club, appointed Lukens to the Club committee of Publications & Communications and directed him to write articles and speak about government-owned toll roads and of California relinquishing both Yosemite Valley and the Mariposa Grove of Big Trees to the federal government, which were then under state management. In a letter to Lukens, Muir urged Lukens to "stir up the Senate Interior Section and make their lives wretched until they do what is right for the woods."

Lukens corresponded with various people and local newspapers concerning the Sierra Club campaign. In a letter to the Pasadena Daily News, Lukens wrote- "The small portion of this great park now owned and controlled by the State of California should be receded to the national government, and have it all under one management. then there would be no need of petition for roads. The whole park would be cared for as the Yellowstone now is..." -Pasadena Daily News, undated.

Lukens spent most of 1896 actively involved in the politics of conservation, except for three months spent mountaineering in Yosemite, which ended in controversy a year later. He was accompanied by Walter Richardson, a young Pasadenian. Both Lukens and Richardson wrote about the horseback trip for the Sierra Club Bulletin and the weekly Pasadena newspaper Town Talk. Highlights of the expedition included trail-building into steep Tehipite Valley, which Richardson named "Lukens Trail". (A young hiker by the name of Amy Racina would write a non-fiction book of her 60-foot (18 m) fall, survival and rescue in this same valley in 2003.) They had special permission to carry firearms for "personal protection" only, as no hunting was allowed in the park. While the men stayed at a private cattlemen's cabin, five bears were killed. No guilty conscience appears in Lukens' journals, possibly because he was on private land. The United States Army was the park's law enforcement and viewed the situation as a violation of the permit. The reports and the permit were sent to the Sierra Club in January, 1897. The incident led to an exchange of letters between Lukens and Muir. Lukens was unapologetic about the hunting incident but Muir in turn advocated the creation of wildlife refuges within the national park and forest reservations. "Sort of a wild beast paradise," Muir described it in a letter to Lukens. Both Muir and Lukens continued their conservation efforts.

During 1897 Both Lukens and Muir were active in different areas of the evolving conservation movement. "I've been writing about the forests, doing what little I can to save them," Muir wrote to a colleague, Henry Fairfield Osborne. Lukens that year began his campaign for watershed protection of the San Gabriel Reserve. He advocated fire protection, tree planting and removal of stockmen from the reserve. He and others undertook two pack trips into the reserve in 1897 and one expedition in 1998. Lukens wrote little, but was a prolific photographer, documenting trees, rocks and conditions during the pack trips. Lukens was often quoted in newspapers, because he gave talks to community groups about his ideas for preserving the watersheds. In an 1898 article in the Los Angeles Times, Lukens was quoted terming the driving of stock in the mountains as "Hoofed Locusts." His argument (and Muir's) was that sheep destroyed the mountain meadows by grazing away all vegetation and that stockman were guilty of setting wildfires at the end of the season to create more meadow for the following year.

Lukens's first tree planting expedition on the mountain ridges occurred in 1900. Fifteen years later the Los Angeles County Board of Supervisors ascended Mt. Wilson to view the earlier work: "As the father of reforestation of these mountains, it was a happy day for T.P. Lukens who went with the party and looked with a feeling of pride on the result of his efforts many years ago," The Los Angeles Times reported June 12, 1915. Although Lukens' advocacy of reforestation was well received by local officials, it does not appear that further reforestation efforts were carried out. The 1915 article went on to predict, "as a result of this foresight and the trip yesterday, 1,000,000 trees perhaps will be planted on the barren and burned stretches of the mountains this year." No news report exists indicating the plan was carried out. Lukens was then four months shy of his 67th birthday.

== Early life ==
Lukens was born into a German Quaker family in Ohio on October 6, 1848. When Lukens was 6 years old, the family moved to Illinois and began a nursery business. He enlisted in the US Cavalry at 20 and two years later received an honorable discharge. After military service, he married his first wife, Charlotte Dyer. He began his own nursery business in Whiteside County, Illinois, growing fruit and ornamental trees. The nursery also included a floral department. He involved himself in local community affairs, including the job of tax collector from 1873 to 1876. Their only child, Helen was born January 9, 1872, and when she turned 8, he moved the family to California to improve a deteriorating financial and health situation.

== Pasadena settlement ==
The Lukens family settled in Pasadena in December, 1880. Theodore Lukens was active in his new community and by 1884, he was elected Justice of the Peace, as well as a member of the new Republican Committee.

In 1884, anti-Chinese violence swept through Pasadena targeting the Chinese American businesses that had begun opening the prior year on what is now Mills Place in Old Town Pasadena. Lukens, along with nearly 100 others, signed a pledge not to lease to any persons of Chinese heritage. The same day that the names on the pledge were revealed, a white mob gathered by a Chinese laundry, started a fire after throwing stones at the business, and eventually looted the establishment after the workers had fled. The next day, the business owners on the street returned to find a lynched effigy of a Chinese man. The same day, Pasadena issued an official ordinance banning persons of Chinese descent from central Pasadena, demanding that they leave the city within 24 hours, or else the city would "call out the crowd, and they would run the Chinese out by force." The anti-Chinese movement Lukens was involved in was successful in driving Pasadena's 60-100 residents of Chinese descent from the city, and none of the perpetrators of the anti-Chinese riot were ever named or prosecuted.

Two years later, the Southern California land boom swept Lukens, the first real estate agent in Pasadena, into a wealthy position. He is credited with selling his large interests in the Raymond Tract, one of the earliest subdivisions of acreage at the time. The year 1886 was a busy one, the town of Pasadena incorporated on June 14, the Pasadena National Bank began accepting deposits and the 201-room Raymond Hotel opened in November for snow-weary guests. Lukens' was able to semi-retire from his real estate business, he sold his properties and traveled. He wrote the first advertising booklet for the town, in the hope of getting the hotel guests to settle in Pasadena. Rich in superlatives, the booklet is titled Pasadena, California, Illustrated and Described and is now a collector's piece.

In April, 1888, the Board of Trade was organized with Lukens as a charter member. The Board was an early-day chamber of commerce for Pasadena, to attract industry and promote the city.

Pasadena's public library opened in 1890, with support of Lukens in fundraiser events such as the 10-day Art Loan Exhibit in February, 1889. Each day had a different historical theme with speeches by well-known people. On Russian Day Lukens exhibited his Alaskan artifacts. On Forestry Day, the speakers were Abbot Kinney, the State Forestry Commissioner and Jessie Benton Fremont, wife of John Fremont. The new library's dedication ceremony included Lukens, Kinney and Amos G. Throop, a Pasadena Trustee (city councilmember).

In 1891, Lukens was a cashier for the Pasadena National Bank and by 1895, bank president. He helped the local banking industry during the Panic of 1893 by enlisting aid from bankers in Los Angeles. Although short-lived, the Panic of 1893 was severe with over 150 national and 172 state bank failures.

=== Mayor ===
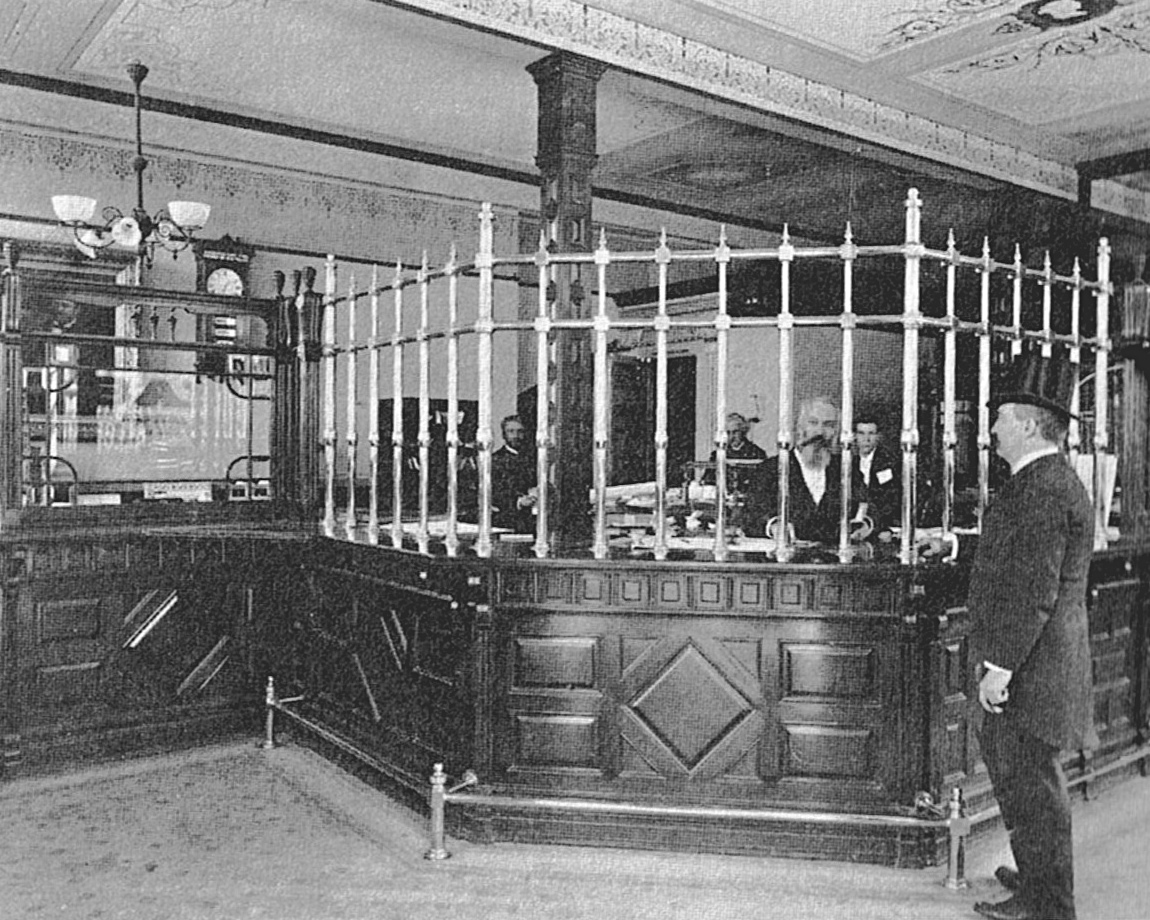
National Bank of Pasadena, 1895

Lukens served as president (mayor) of Pasadena twice; the first two-year term was 1890–1892 and a partial term from 1894 to 1895 when he was replaced by John S. Cox. Lukens's second term as mayor ended on January 2, 1895, as he was summarily "retired" from office because he refused to endorse a resolution allowing a franchise by Southern Pacific Railroad for a railway through Arroyo Parkway to Broadway Street to Green Street. There was already a Santa Fe line, the electric Mount Lowe Railway to Echo Mountain and a local rail line to Los Angeles. The council voted against their president and for the franchise and Lukens left with his convictions intact. Public opinion was expressed in newspapers and favored Lukens' decision. "To be disposed from a position for no other fault than standing for principles, is an honor rather than a disgrace", commented the Los Angeles Daily Hotel Gazette. During Lukens' first term as mayor, he had the pleasure of receiving two dignitaries: President Benjamin Harrison and First Lady Caroline, who visited Pasadena on March 23 and 24, 1891 during their tour of the west.

Lukens was a member of many local boards and committees, such as the Pasadena World's Fair Committee and provided orange trees and 60 palm trees for the exhibit in the World's Columbian Exposition held in Chicago, Illinois in 1892 that commemorated the 400th anniversary of America's discovery by Christopher Columbus. He was awarded a medal of honor with his name inscribed. In addition, Lukens served as president of Pasadena Mutual Building and Loan Association, board member of two schools which were the Los Angeles State Normal School (college) and California Institute of Technology, and he was a member of the Los Angeles Chamber of Commerce.

== Later years ==
Lukens became a grandfather in 1891 to Charlotte (or "Lottie") Jones, and in 1893, Ralph Jones. The health of Lukens and his wife Charlotte was declining by 1903, and Charlotte died in December 1905. Lukens then requested his three-month leave of absence from the Forest Service. Lukens remarried July, 1906 to Hannah Sybil Swett, a long-time family friend and Christian Scientist. He subsequently adopted his wife's religion.

In his waning years, Lukens remained active in local affairs and conservation. He promoted the establishment of a park above Devil's Gate Dam, which eventually became a reality as Oak Grove Park. Two months before his death, Lukens wrote a report on conservation and forestry for the annual meeting of the Bureau of Forestry.

Theodore Lukens died July 1, 1918, and is buried next to his first wife at Mountain View Cemetery in Altadena, California. H. Sybil Swett Lukens died in December of that same year. The Los Angeles Times published an obituary on Theodore Lukens on July 5, 1918, which stated in part, "There is a new, growing forest of neglected pine trees on the slopes of the Sierras [San Gabriel Mountains] above Pasadena that stand as a living proof that Lukens could have reforested our mountains if we had only given him the help he asked. He would have restored to us the lost beauty of the hills and he would have, at the same time, saved us from a disaster which may one day overtake us."

A Lukens Memorial Forestry Society was begun by poet John S. McGroarty and Marshall V. Hartranft, co-founder of the socialist Little Lands Colony. The Society fostered reforestation and endured until the 1950s.

=== Helen Lukens ===
Helen became a published writer and photographer of some note during the first decade of the 20th century. The photograph of John Muir on the introductory page of Linnie Marsh Wolf's Pulitzer prize-winning biography of Muir was taken by Helen Lukens.

She was married in 1890 to Edward Everett Jones, the Bank of Pasadena cashier who replaced Lukens, and they had two children, Charlotte ("Lottie") and Ralph. Lottie became a favorite of John Muir and she considered him a second father. The marriage to Edward Jones did not last, and in 1906, Helen married James H. Gaut.

Helen Lukens Jones was the first woman to travel by automobile up the Mount Wilson Toll Road Company's nine-mile (14 km)-long, narrow, 10% grade road that went from Eaton Canyon through Henninger Flats and then to the summit.

Decades after her father's death, Helen sold his records, diaries and papers to the Huntington Library which are now used in various studies. The collection is over 3,600 pieces.

== Tributes ==
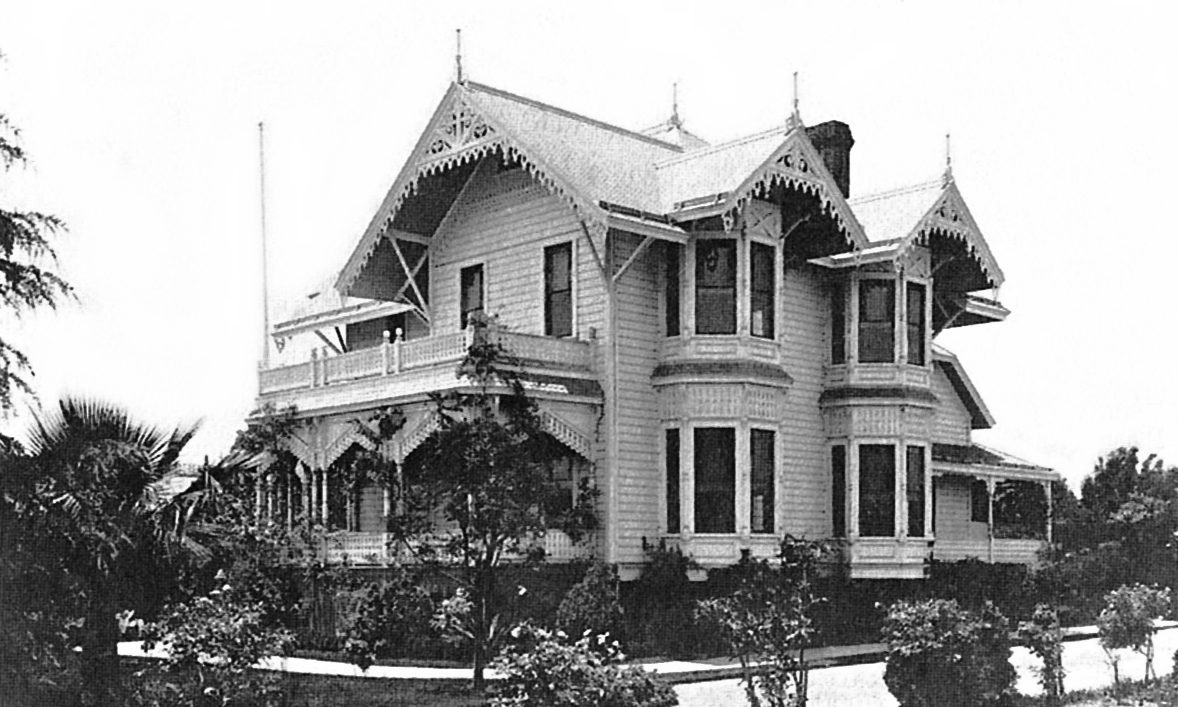
Lukens' home on N. El Molino Avenue in Pasadena, California

The "Father of Forestry" Theodore Lukens is memorialized today with Mount Lukens, Lukens Lake in Yosemite, and his home listed on the National Register of Historic Places.

Sister Elsie Peak was renamed to Mount Lukens by the Forest Service in the 1920s. Mount Lukens is the highest point within the city limits of Los Angeles at an elevation of 5,074 feet (1,546.5 m).

Robert Bradford Marshall, a 30-year veteran of the US Geological Survey named a lake in Yosemite National Park for Lukens in 1894.

The Lukens family home on 267 N. El Molino Avenue in Pasadena was added to the National Register of Historic Places on March 29, 1984. The house was designed by Harry Ridgeway, who also designed the city jail and some of Pasadena's early Methodist and Episcopal churches.
