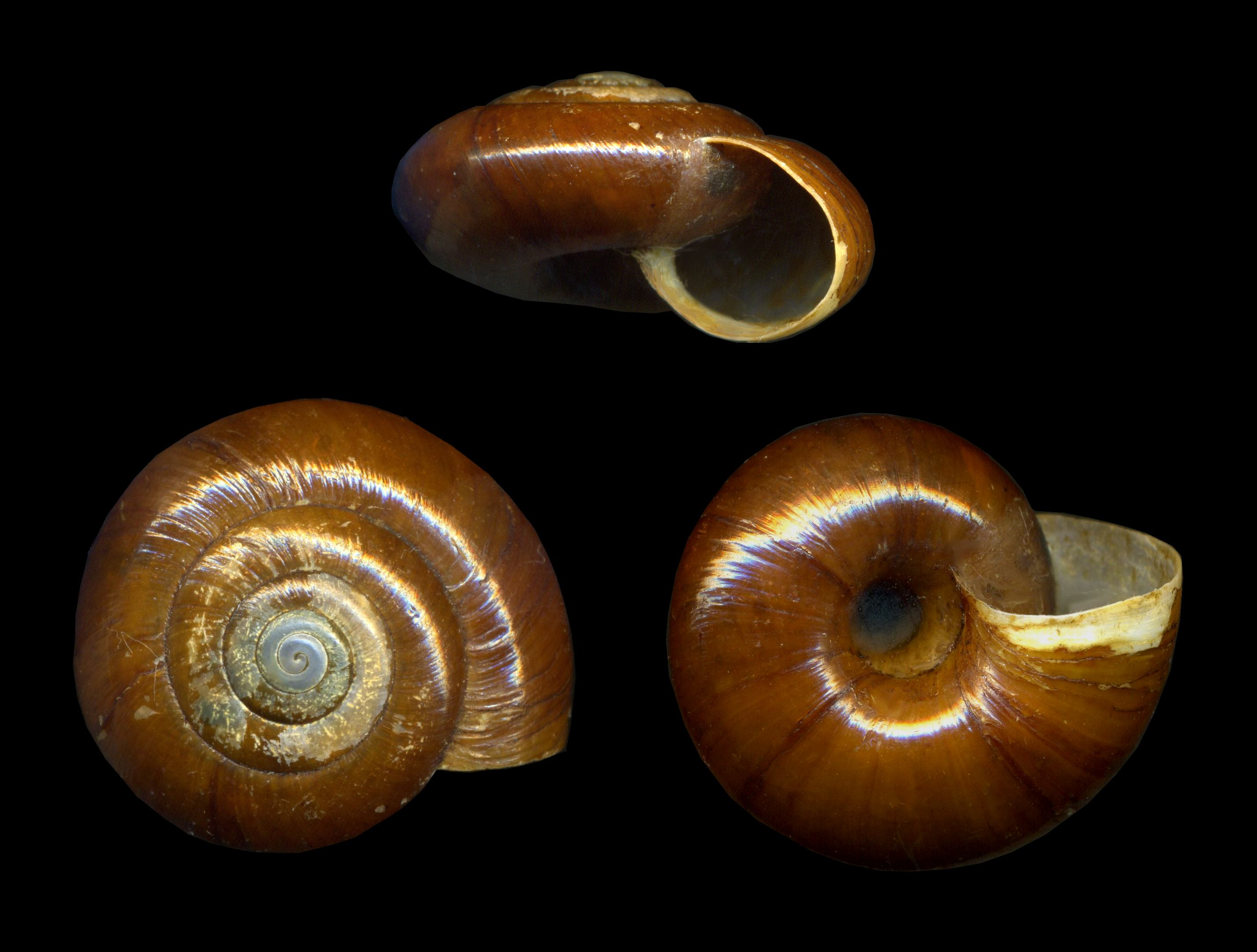
- Three views of a shell of Glyptostoma gabrielense

Scientific classification
- Kingdom: Animalia
- Phylum: Mollusca
- Class: Gastropoda
- Order: Stylommatophora
- Superfamily: Rhytidoidea
- Family: Megomphicidae; H. B. Baker, 1930

Genera
- See text

Synonyms
- Ammonitellinae Pilsbry, 1930; Polygyrellinae H. B. Baker, 1955

= Megomphicidae =

Family of gastropods

Megomphicidae is a taxonomic family of air-breathing land snails, terrestrial pulmonate gastropod mollusks in the superfamily Acavoidea (according to the taxonomy of the Gastropoda by Bouchet & Rocroi, 2005).

== Genera ==
The family Megomphicidae has no subfamilies.

Genera within the family Megomphicidae include:

- Ammonitella J. G. Cooper, 1868
- Glyptostoma Bland and W. G. Binney, 1873
- Megomphix H. B. Baker, 1930
- Polygyrella W. G. Binney, 1863
- Polygyroidea Pilsbry, 1930
