= San Gabriel National Forest =

Protected area in California, US

Coordinates: 34.3197°N 117.9576°W

San Gabriel National Forest was established as the San Gabriel Forest Reserve (or San Gabriel Timberland Reserve) by the United States General Land Office in California on December 20, 1892 through a proclamation order by President Benjamin Harrison. With and area of 555,520 acres (2,248.1 km^{2}) (extending from Pacoima Canyon at Sylmar to Cajon Pass in Southern California), it was the first federal reserve in the state of California.

After the transfer of federal forests to the U.S. Forest Service in 1905, it became a National Forest on March 4, 1907.

On July 1, 1908, part of the forest was combined with Angeles National Forest and the remainder with Santa Barbara National Forest, and the name was discontinued.

== History ==
The U.S. Congress passed the Forest Reserve Act in 1891 which contained an amendment, section 24, that gave the president the power to establish federal reserves of forest and rangelands from the public domain. The Yellowstone Park Timberland Reserve was the very first reserve authorized under the Forest Reserve Act (also known as the General Revision Act and the Creative Act) in the country. Most people in Southern California recognized and welcomed the reserve system, for it promised to protect watersheds, soil, provide fire suppression and control timber cutting in the mountains.

The United States General Land Office was the federal agency in charge of administering public lands from 1812 to 1934. Conservationist Abbot Kinney, as well as Los Angeles residents and public officials vigorously fought for these land set asides. On November 2, 1891, a petition was sent to the General Land Office requesting the withdrawal of the San Gabriel watershed as a forest reserve. The petition stated, "Water, will be preserved in the mountains, the snow water saved as it melted, the waters protected from pollution by the large droves of cattle and sheep, disastrous floods will be prevented in winter, and the valley's [sic] below furnished with water in the irrigation season." Colonel Benjamin F. Allen was sent out from the General Land Office to investigate San Gabriel area and other lands in the western states and filed a report that recommended the reserve be set aside.

In 1907, the reserves were renamed "National Forests" by a sub-section of an Agriculture Appropriations bill.

=== Grazing and fire ===
Cattle and sheep ranching had long been California's main business with the stock fattening up on public domain lands. Despite the devastating drought in 1863-4, the cattle industry grew until it dominated the region in the 1880s. These American successors to the Mexican rancheros became powerful land barons and their stock competed for choice pastureland with the sheep herds. Because of this, California's grasslands were overstocked causing progressively more damage.

Although fire is a natural and necessary occurrence in forest and range ecosystems, it was overused by cattlemen, sheepherders, lumbermen and prospectors in the 1800s. Burning the woods was a practical and efficient way to improve grazing areas. Fires set in autumn left ash and minerals, improving forage (plant growth) in the spring. It also removed obstacles such as fallen logs for the herder and undergrowth that hid the strata for the prospector.

In Southern California foothills, an increasing population placed people and property in danger from fire and subsequent flooding. A rising cry of protest was beginning from the towns and cities which was echoed in the newspapers. The United States Geographical Survey (USGS) reports, dated 1899 and 1900, showed large areas of chaparral had been repeatedly burned and severe damage to soil and water holding capacity had resulted. Another report, this one from the US Bureau of Forestry (now US Forest Service) found poor conditions on the Tujunga, Arroyo Seco, and the Santa Ana watersheds.

=== Local citizen action ===
During this time period, Abbot Kinney, a conservationist and Pasadena landowner, saw from his ranch the destruction by the unrestrained use of the San Gabriel Mountains for logging and grazing.
In 1886, Kinney, as chairman of the state Board of Forestry, wrote to the governor of California, George Stoneman,

"The necessity of the hour is an intelligent supervision of the forest land and brush lands of California,,,"

In 1890, The Board petitioned the US Congress to properly administer (through the General Land Office) the state's timberlands instead of ignoring them.

A fellow conservationist, Theodore Lukens, also pushed for greater protection, but through the planting of trees. Being a citrus grower, he was interested in tree culture and believed this was the best method of restoring destroyed areas on mountainsides and along streams.

In addition to these men, local leaders such as the mayor of Los Angeles, Fred Eaton, and General Harrison Gray Otis, publisher of the Los Angeles Times newspaper, supported efforts for watershed protection.
They joined forces to lobby the federal government to take action in preventing more damage.

== See also ==
Public Land Survey System

== Bibliography ==
- Cermak, Robert W. Fire In The Forest-A History of Forest Fire Control on the National Forests in California 1898-1956 USDA Forest Service Publishers, 2005 ISBN 1-59351-429-8
- Godfrey, Anthony The Ever-Changing View-A History of the National Forests in California USDA Forest Service Publishers, 2005 ISBN 1-59351-428-X
