= San Gabriel Mountains National Monument =

National monument in California, United States

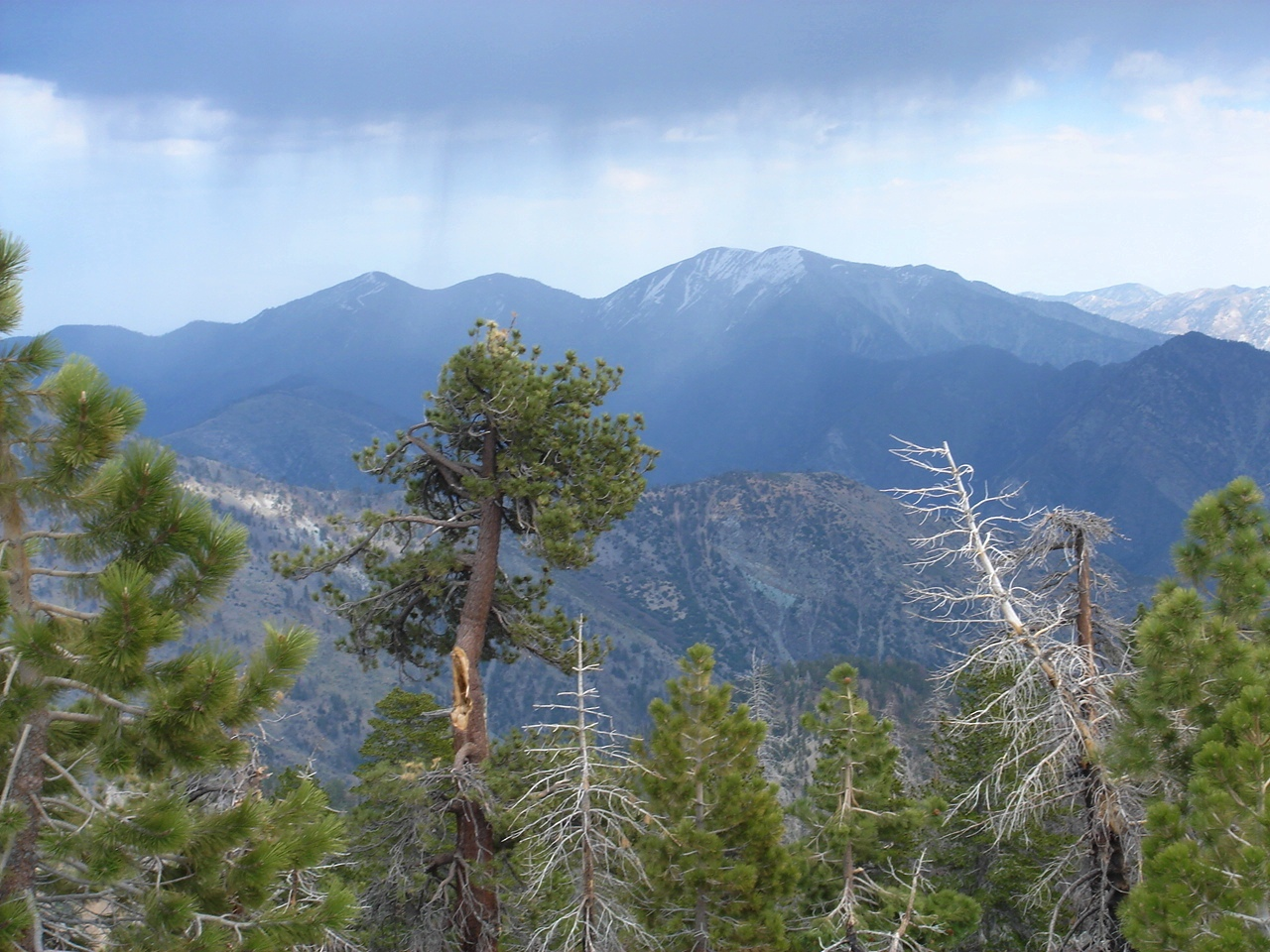

- Location within the Los Angeles metropolitan area Location within California Location within the United States
- Interactive map of San Gabriel Mountains National Monument
- Location: Los Angeles County, California, United States
- Coordinates: 34°15′0″N 117°50′20″W
- Area: 452,096 acres (182,957 ha)
- Established: October 10, 2014
- Governing body: U.S. Forest Service
- Website: San Gabriel Mountains National Monument

The San Gabriel Mountains National Monument is a United States national monument managed by the U.S. Forest Service, which encompasses parts of the Angeles National Forest and the San Bernardino National Forest in California. On October 10, 2014, President Barack Obama used his authority under the Antiquities Act to create the new monument, protecting 346,177 acres of public lands in the San Gabriel Mountains of the Transverse Ranges. The effort to protect the San Gabriel Mountains began more than a century earlier in 1891, with another U.S. President, Benjamin Harrison, using his authority established by Congress, to designate and delineate the first federal protection in the United States of forested lands as the San Gabriel Timberland Reserve. Two earlier California conservationists, Abbot Kinney and John Muir, influenced Congress.

The headquarters of the San Gabriel Mountains National Monument is located in Glendora.

== Geography ==
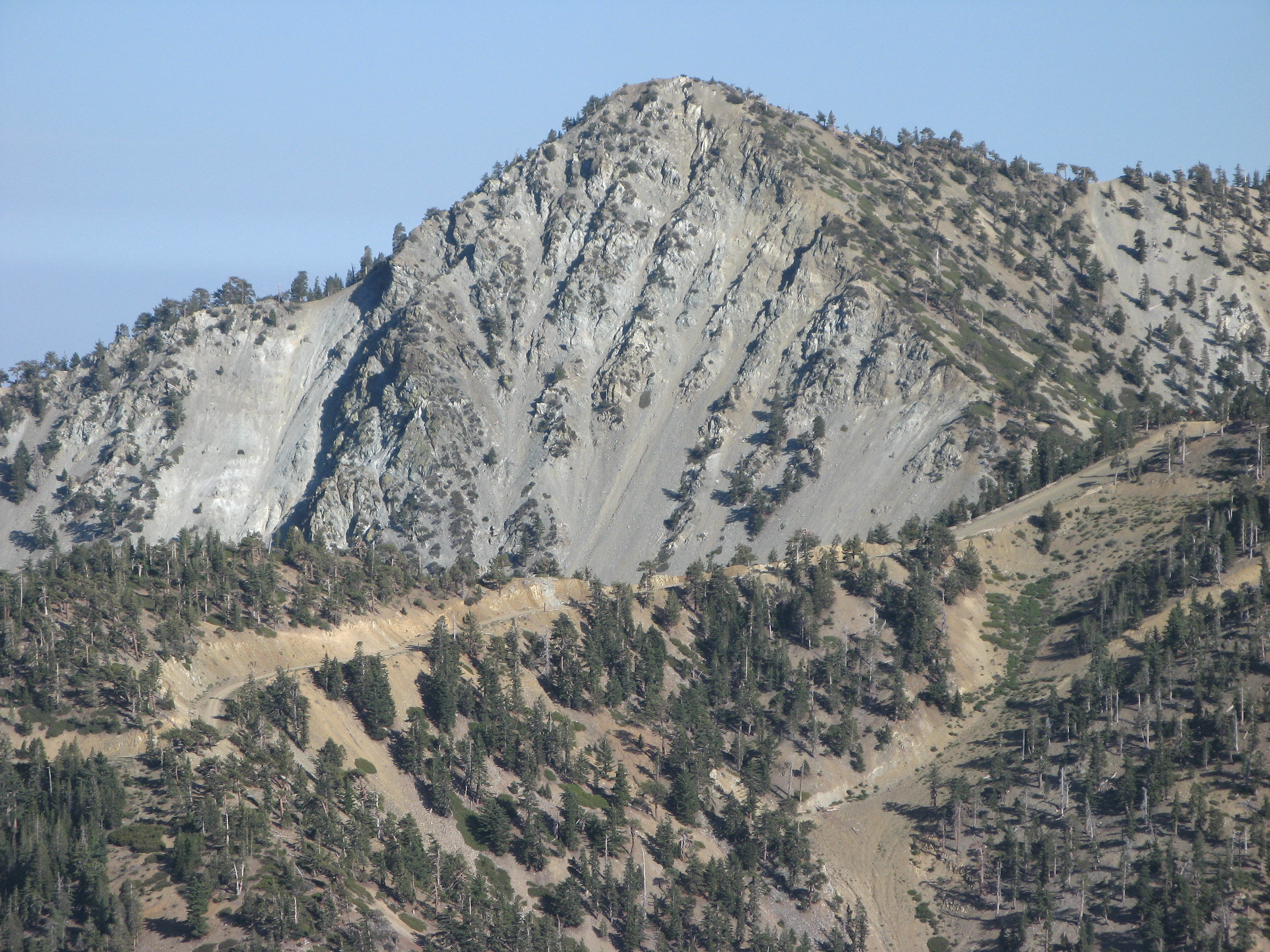
Telegraph Peak

The monument covers the central and northern regions of the San Gabriel Mountains, extending west to east from Upper Sand Canyon at Little Tujunga Canyon Road to Telegraph Peak. It contains the Sheep Mountain Wilderness, the San Gabriel Wilderness, and Pleasant View Ridge Wilderness. Most of the major peaks of the San Gabriels are within the limits of the monument, including Mount San Antonio, Mount Baden-Powell, and Throop Peak. The Silver Moccasin Trail lies within the monument. The monument only covers a limited portion of the range's western extent, and much of the southern portion of the range has been excluded from the monument. It does not contain the Cucamonga Peak region.

== Monument history ==
The movement to further preserve the San Gabriel Mountains began in 2003 when then Congresswoman Hilda Solis initiated an environmental feasibility report to see if it was possible to increase protection by National Monument designation.

=== Establishment of the National Monument ===
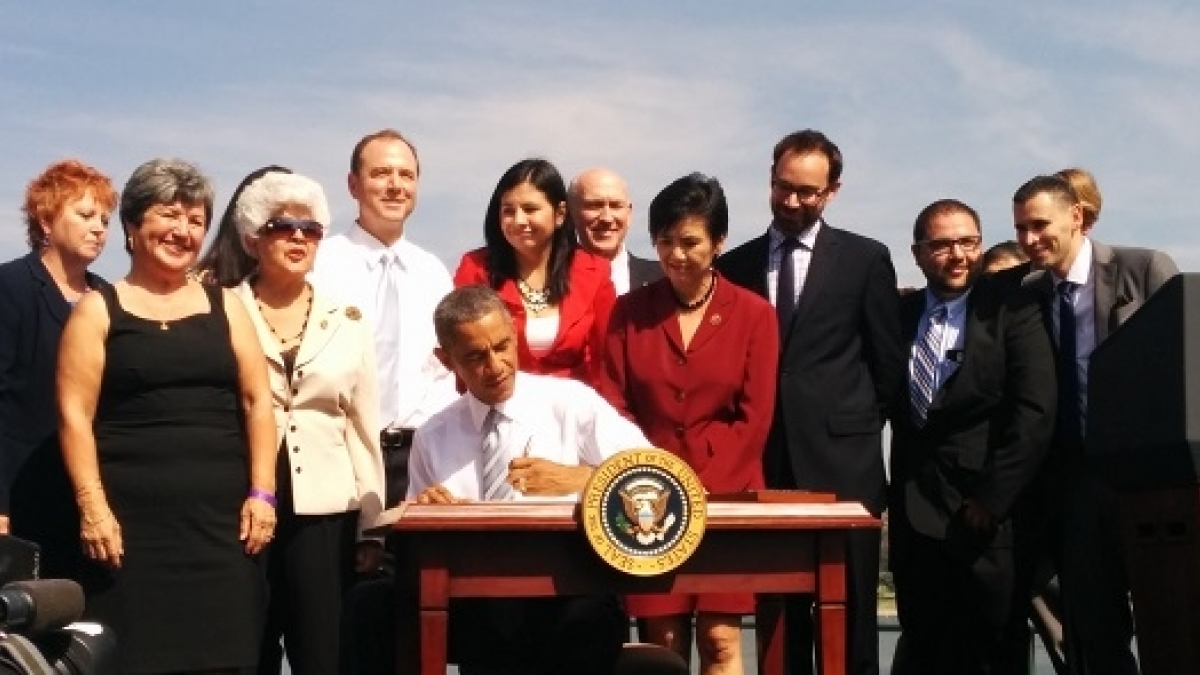
President Obama signs proclamation declaring the San Gabriel Mountains as a national monument

The National Monument was established on October 10, 2014, by proclamation of President Barack Obama under the Antiquities Act. More than 15 million people live within 90 minutes of the San Gabriel Mountains, which provides 70 percent of the open space for Angeleños and 30 percent of their drinking water. Polling indicated that 80 percent of Los Angeles County voters supported the proposed protection of the San Gabriel Mountains and rivers.

The creation of the monument was in response to decades of input and support from the local community demanding greater environmental protections for the heavily touristed region. There have been longstanding concerns about pollution and vandalism in the region's subalpine forests and watersheds. Public health and Latino groups also advocated for protecting the public lands in the San Gabriel Mountains as an opportunity to protect access to open space and outdoor recreation as a way to counter the shortage of parks and open space in Los Angeles County which they claim has contributed to high childhood obesity rates.

The Obama administration cited the presence of endangered species, important cultural resources, and the threat of unreliable funding for management and encroaching development as the proximal reasons for the establishment of the monument. In addition, all existing rights-of-way continue to be honored and existing recreational activities—such as hiking, camping, fishing and cycling—will be unaffected.

Local officials, including Los Angeles Mayor Eric Garcetti, cheered the news along with Hispanic, recreation, and conservation groups. Its establishment faced limited opposition from local residents. To alleviate concerns, the extent of the monument does not cover most of the southern slopes of the San Gabriel Mountains, and excludes towns in the region.

=== Expansion ===
In May 2023, Representative Judy Chu and Senator Alex Padilla introduced a package of bills that would expand the monument by over 100,000 acres and additionally designate 31,000 acres as protected wilderness. In June 2023, Chu and Padilla sent a letter to President Joe Biden asking him to expand the monument by proclamation under the Antiquities Act. In May 2024, President Biden issued a proclamation expanding the monument by 105,919 acres.

== See also ==
- Jackson Lake (California)
- San Gabriel Mountains−related topics
- Natural history of the Transverse Ranges
- List of national monuments of the United States
