= Frederick Russell Burnham =

American scout and adventurer (1861–1947)

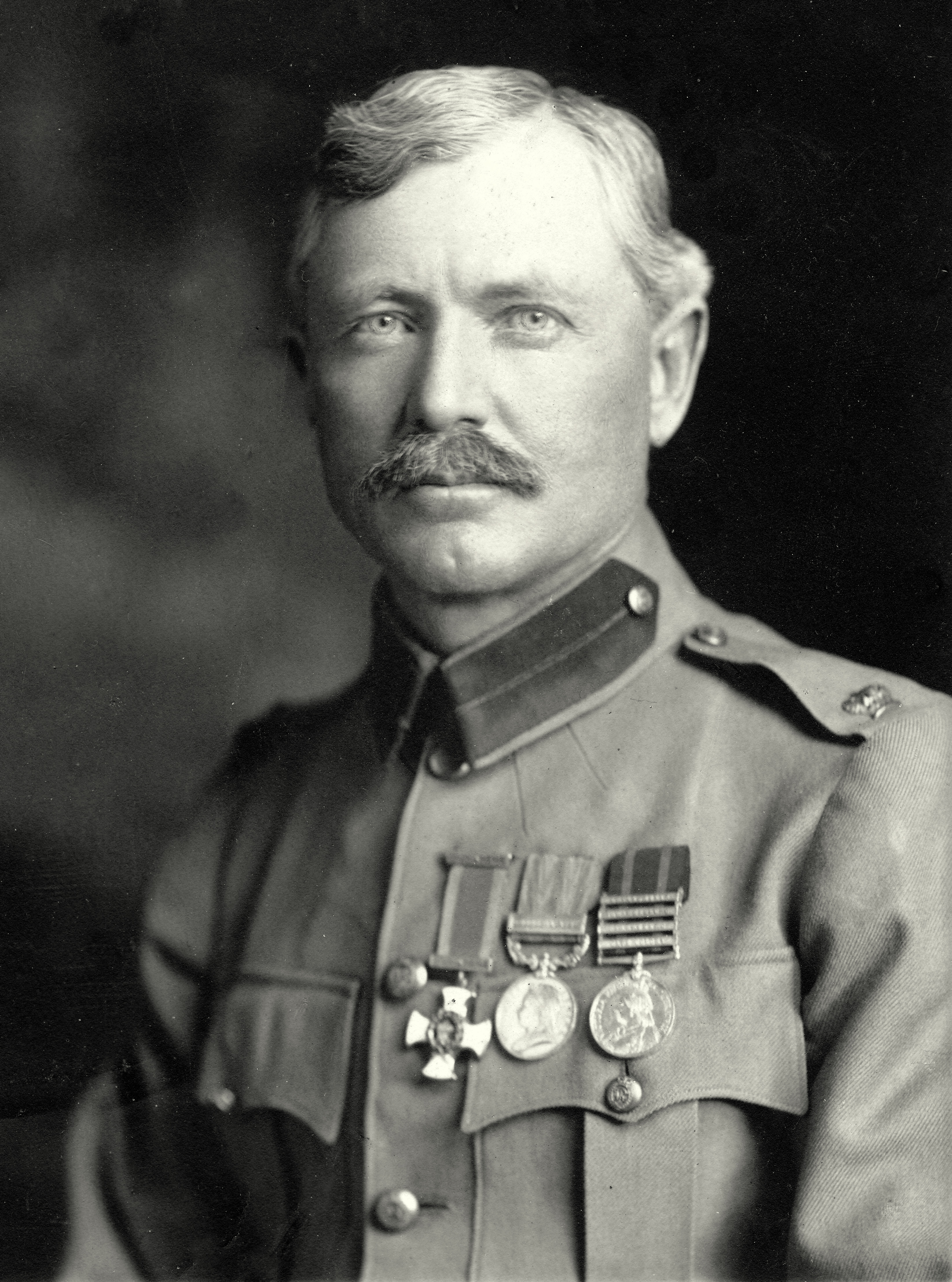
- Major Burnham in his British Army uniform in 1901
- Born: May 11, 1861; Tivoli, Minnesota (Sioux Indian territory; near Mankato, Minnesota)
- Died: September 1, 1947 (aged 86); Santa Barbara, California, U.S.
- Burial place: Three Rivers, California; 36.4218°N 118.9047°W
- Spouses: Blanche Blick (m. 1884–1939; her death); Ilo Willits (m. 1943–1947; his death)
- Relatives: Rev. Edwin Burnham (father); Howard Burnham (brother); Charles Edward Russell (first cousin)
- Military career
- Allegiance: U.S. citizen; scout for the United States Army, and for the British South Africa Company and British Army in southern Africa
- Service years: 1893–1897; 1900–1901
- Rank: Major (British Army) Cavalry scout (U.S. Army)
- Nicknames: The King of Scouts; He-who-sees-in-the-dark
- Commands: Chief of Scouts under Lord Roberts
- Conflicts: See battles: Pleasant Valley War; American Indian Wars; Apache Wars; Geronimo campaign; First Matabele War; Shangani Patrol; Second Matabele War; Second Boer War
- Awards: Distinguished Service Order; Queen's South Africa Medal; British South Africa Company Medal; Boy Scouts Silver Buffalo Award
- Other work: Messenger, Indian tracker, cowboy, gold miner, oil man, U.S. spy. Father of the international Scouting movement, Honorary President of the Roosevelt Council (Arizona) Boy Scouts of America

Frederick Russell Burnham (May 11, 1861 – September 1, 1947) was an American scout and world-traveling adventurer. He is known for his service to the British South Africa Company and to the British Army in colonial Africa, and for teaching woodcraft to Robert Baden-Powell in Rhodesia. Burnham helped inspire the founding of the international Scouting Movement.

Burnham was born on a Dakota Sioux Indian reservation in Minnesota, in the small village of Tivoli near the city of Mankato; there he learned the ways of Native Americans as a boy. By the age of 14, he was supporting himself in California, while also learning scouting from some of the last of the cowboys and frontiersmen of the American Southwest. Burnham had little formal education, never finishing high school. After moving to the Arizona Territory in the early 1880s, he was drawn into the Pleasant Valley War, a feud between families of ranchers and sheepherders. He escaped and later worked as a civilian tracker for the United States Army in the Apache Wars. Feeling the need for new adventures, Burnham took his family to southern Africa in 1893, seeing Cecil Rhodes's Cape to Cairo Railway project as the next undeveloped frontier.

Burnham distinguished himself in several battles in Rhodesia and South Africa and became Chief of Scouts. Despite his U.S. citizenship, his military title was British and his rank of major was formally given to him by King Edward VII. In special recognition of Burnham's heroism, the King invested him into the Companions of the Distinguished Service Order, giving Burnham the highest military honors earned by any American in the Second Boer War. He had become friends with Baden-Powell during the Second Matabele War in Rhodesia, teaching him outdoor skills and inspiring what would later become known as Scouting. Burnham returned to the United States, where he became involved in national defense efforts, business, oil, conservation, and the Boy Scouts of America (BSA).

During World War I, Burnham was selected as an officer and recruited volunteers for a U.S. Army division similar to the Rough Riders, which Theodore Roosevelt intended to lead into France. For political reasons, the unit was disbanded without seeing action. After the war, Burnham and his business partner John Hays Hammond formed the Burnham Exploration Company; they became wealthy from oil discovered in California. Burnham joined several new wilderness conservation organizations, including the California State Parks Commission. In the 1930s, he worked with the BSA to save the big horn sheep from extinction. This effort led to the creation of the Kofa and Cabeza Prieta National Wildlife Refuges in Arizona. He earned the BSA's highest honor, the Silver Buffalo Award, in 1936, and remained active in the organization at both the regional and national level until his death in 1947. To symbolize the friendship between Burnham and Baden-Powell, the mountain beside Mount Baden-Powell in California was formally named Mount Burnham in 1951.

== Early life ==
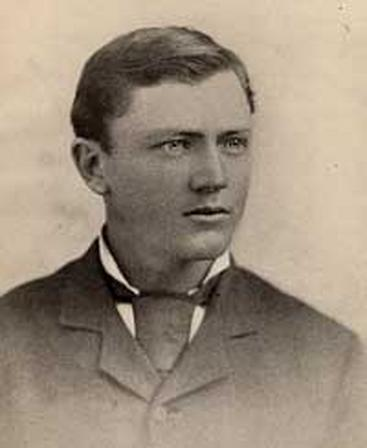
Burnham in Arizona Territory in 1881

Burnham was born on May 11, 1861, on a Dakota Sioux Indian reservation in Minnesota, to a missionary family living near the small pioneer town of Tivoli (now gone), about 20 miles (32 km) from Mankato. His father, the Reverend Edwin Otway Burnham, was a Presbyterian minister educated and ordained in New York; he was born in Ghent, Kentucky. (Note: According to McClintock and other sources, Burnham's father was a Congregational minister; Burnham latterly wrote of his father as a "Presbyterian preacher". In Edwin Burnham's time, Presbyterians and Congregationalists cooperated in establishing many new congregations in the Midwestern United States. "Presbygationalists", as these congregations were sometimes known, were allowed to choose either a Presbyterian or a Congregational pastor.) His mother Rebecca Russell Burnham had spent most of her childhood in Iowa, having emigrated with her family from Westminster, England at the age of three. In the Dakota War of 1862, Chief Little Crow and his Sioux warriors attacked the nearby town New Ulm, Minnesota; Burnham's father was in Mankato buying ammunition at the time, so when Burnham's mother saw Sioux approaching her cabin dressed in war paint, she knew she had to leave and could never escape carrying her baby. She hid Frederick in a basket of green corn husks in a corn field and fled for her life. Once the Sioux attack had been repulsed, she returned to find their house burned down, but the baby Frederick was safe, fast asleep in the basket with the corn husks.

The young Burnham attended schools in Iowa. There he met Blanche Blick, whom he later married. The Burnham family moved from Minnesota to Los Angeles, California in 1870, in search of easier living conditions soon after Edwin was seriously injured in an accident while rebuilding the family homestead. Two years later, Edwin died, leaving the family destitute. Burnham's mother and three-year-old younger brother Howard returned to Iowa to live with her parents; the 12-year-old Burnham remained in California alone to repay his family's debts and ultimately make his own way.

For the next few years, Burnham worked as a mounted messenger for the Western Union Telegraph Company in California and Arizona Territory. On one occasion his horse was stolen from him by Tiburcio Vásquez, a famous Californio bandit. At 14, he began his life as a scout and Indian tracker in the Apache Wars, during which he took part in the United States Army expedition to find and capture or kill the Apache chief Geronimo. In Prescott, Arizona, he met an old scout named Lee who served under General George Crook. Lee taught Burnham how to track Apache by detecting the odor of burning mescal, a species of aloe they often cooked and ate. With careful study of the local air currents and canyons, trackers could follow the odor to Apache hiding places from as far away as 6 miles (9.7 km). During the Apache uprisings, the young Burnham also learned much from Al Sieber, the Chief of Scouts, and his assistant Archie McIntosh, who had been Chief of Scouts in Crook's last two campaigns. Burnham learned much about scouting from these Indian trackers, who were advanced in age and fading from the frontier, including the vital lesson that "it is imperative that a scout should know the history, tradition, religion, social customs, and superstitions of whatever country or people he is called on to work in or among." But the scout who was to have perhaps the greatest influence on Burnham during his formative years was a man named Holmes.

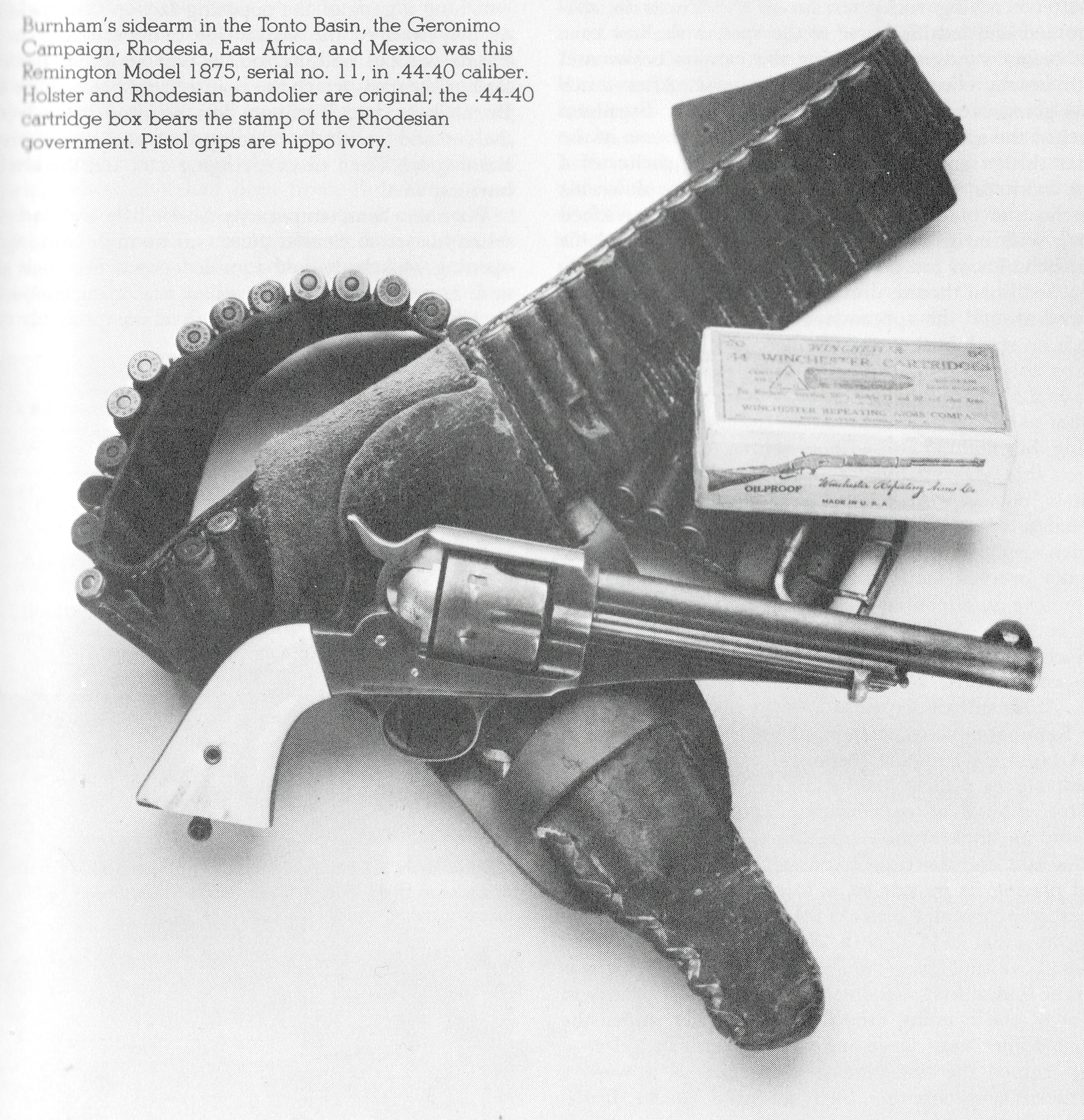
The six-shooter Burnham purchased as a teenager in Prescott, Arizona, which he kept all his life and later used in Rhodesia, East Africa and Mexico

Holmes had served under Kit Carson and John C. Fremont, but he was old and physically impaired when he met Burnham. He had lost all of his family in the Indian wars and before he died he wanted to impart his knowledge of the frontier to the young Burnham. The two men traveled throughout the American Southwest and northern Mexico, and Holmes taught him many scouting skills, such as how to track a trail, how to double and cover one's own trail, how to properly ascend and descend precipices, and how to tell the time at night. Burnham also learned survival skills from Holmes, such as where to find water in the desert, how to protect himself from snakes, and what to do in case of forest fires or floods. A stickler for details, Holmes impressed on him that even in the simplest things, such as braiding a rope, tying a knot, or putting on or taking off a saddle, there is a right way and a wrong way. The two men earned a living by hunting and prospecting. Burnham also worked as a cowboy, a guard for the mines, a guide, and a scout during these years.

In Globe, Arizona, Burnham unwittingly joined the losing side of the Pleasant Valley War before mass killing started, and only narrowly escaped death. He had no stake in the feud, but he was drawn into the conflict by his association with the Gordon family. According to Lott, Burnham was drawn into the conflict by his association with the Fred Wells and his family; Money states that it was the Gordon Family. In his memoirs, Scouting on Two Continents, Burnham never gives the name of the family, but in the undated manuscript he mentions his friendship with young Tommy Gordon and his family from Globe. Burnham claimed to be involved in the Pleasant Valley War (Scouting on Two Continents, Chapter III, "The Tonto Basin War", in which one of two deputies taking the ranch's cattle was shot and killed. However, see Footnote #6 of Eduardo Obergon Pagan's "Valley of the Guns: The Pleasant Valley War and the Trauma of Violence". Once the killing started, he felt he had to join a faction as a hired gun, although it put him on the wrong side of the law. In between raids and forays, he practiced incessantly with his pistol; he learned to shoot using either hand and from the back of a galloping horse. Even after his faction admitted defeat (the feud would begin again years later), Burnham still had many enemies.

During this time he met "a fine, hard riding young Kansan, who I had met on an Indian raid and whose nerve I greatly admired." The young Kansan, who had been swindled by an unscrupulous superintendent of mines, had a plan to rustle cattle and horses from the superintendent and sell them to Curly Bill (William Brocius), an outlaw with whom he had indirectly been in contact. Both men were broke at the time, and the job sounded easy. But Burnham had always rejected the life of a thief and even as a wanted man, he did not view himself as a criminal. Burnham began to see that even though he joined the feud to help his friends, he had been in the wrong, that "avenging only led to more vengeance and to even greater injustice than that suffered through the often unjustly administered laws of the land."

Burnham decided to reject the offer of the young Kansan (who followed through with the plan and was later killed), and that he needed to leave the Tonto Basin. Judge Aaron Hackney, editor of the local Arizona Silver Belt newspaper and a friend, helped him escape to Tombstone, Arizona with the assistance of Neil McLeod—a well-known prizefighter in Tombstone and one of the most successful smugglers along the Arizona–Mexico frontier. The Gunfight at the O.K. Corral had occurred only a few months earlier, but as Tombstone was a boomtown attracting new silver miners from all parts, it was an ideal location to hide out. Burnham assumed several aliases and occasionally he delivered messages for McLeod and his smuggler partners in Sonora, Mexico. From McLeod, he learned many valuable tricks for avoiding detection, passing coded messages, and throwing off pursuers.

Burnham eventually went back to California to attend high school, but he never graduated. He returned to Arizona and was appointed Deputy Sheriff of Pinal County, but he soon went back to herding cattle and prospecting. After he went to Prescott, Iowa to visit his childhood sweetheart Blanche, the two were married on February 6, 1884. He was 23 years old. He and Blanche settled down soon after in Pasadena, California, to tend to an orange grove but soon Burnham returned to prospecting and scouting. Active as a Freemason, he rose to become a Thirty-Second Degree Mason of the Scottish Rite.

During the 1880s, sections of the American press popularized the notion that the West had been won and there was nothing left to conquer in the United States. The time when great scouts like Kit Carson, Daniel Boone, and Davy Crockett could explore and master the wild and uncharted Western territories was coming to a close. Contemporary scouts such as Buffalo Bill, Wild Bill Hickok, and Texas Jack Omohundro, were leaving the old West to become entertainers, and they battled great Native American chiefs like Sitting Bull, Chief Joseph, and Geronimo only in Wild West shows. In 1890 the United States Census Bureau formally closed the American frontier, ending the system under which land in the Western territories had been sold cheaply to pioneers. As a "soldier of fortune", as Richard Harding Davis later called him, Burnham began to look elsewhere for the next undeveloped frontier, feeling that the American West was becoming tame and unchallenging. When he heard of the work of Cecil Rhodes and his pioneers in southern Africa, who were working to build a railway across Africa from Cape to Cairo, Burnham sold what little he owned. In 1893 with his wife and young son, he set sail for Durban in South Africa, intending to join Rhodes's pioneers in Matabeleland and Mashonaland.

== Military career ==
=== First Matabele War ===
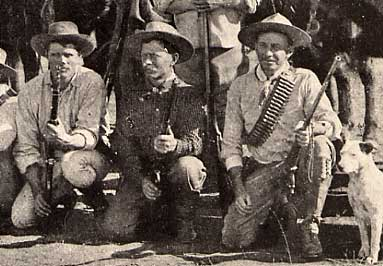
Bob Bain; Burnham (middle) during the First Matabele War in 1893, holding his Winchester model 1873 .44WCF rifle; Maurice Gifford

Burnham, along with his wife and son, was trekking the 1,000 miles (1,609 km) north from Durban to Matabeleland with an American buckboard and six donkeys when war broke out between Rhodes's British South Africa Company and the Matabele (or Ndebele) (Note: The Ndebele people's term for themselves in their own language is amaNdebele (the prefix ama- indicating the plural form of the singular Ndebele), whence comes a term commonly used in other languages, including English: "Matabele". Their language is called isiNdebele, generally rendered "Sindebele" in English. The area they have inhabited since their arrival from Zululand in the early 1800s is called Matabeleland. In historiographical terms, "Matabele" is retained in the names of the First and Second Matabele Wars, the former of which the Shangani Patrol was a part. For clarity, consistency and ease of reading, this article uses the term "Matabele" to refer to the people, and calls their language "Sindebele".) King Lobengula in late 1893. He signed up to scout for the company immediately on reaching Matabeleland, and joined the fighting. Leander Starr Jameson, the company's Chief Magistrate in Mashonaland, hoped to defeat the Matabele quickly by capturing Lobengula at his royal town of Bulawayo, and so sent Burnham and a small group of scouts ahead to report on the situation there. While on the outskirts of town they watched as the Matabele burned down and destroyed everything in sight. By the time the company troops had arrived in force, Lobengula and his warriors had fled and there was little left of old Bulawayo. The company then moved into the remains of Bulawayo, established a base, and sent out patrols to find Lobengula. The most famous of these patrols was the Shangani Patrol, led by Major Allan Wilson and the man he chose as his Chief of Scouts, Fred Burnham.

==== Shangani Patrol ====
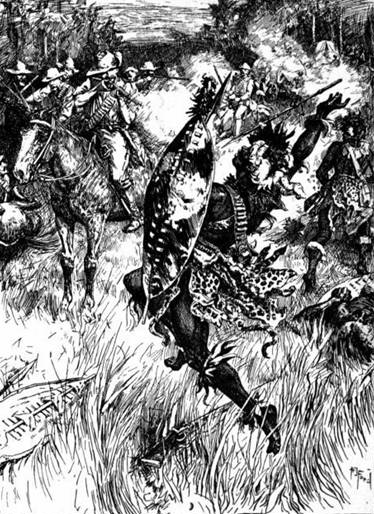
An 1895 sketch, portraying a scene from the Shangani Patrol episode. Burnham (left, on horse) kills a Matabele warrior.

Jameson sent a column of soldiers under Major Patrick Forbes to locate and capture Lobengula. The column camped on the south bank of the Shangani River about 25 mi (40 km) north-east of the village of Lupane on the evening of December 3, 1893. The next day, late in the afternoon, a dozen men under the command of Major Wilson were sent across the river to patrol the area. The Wilson Patrol came across a group of Matabele women and children who claimed to know Lobengula's whereabouts. Burnham, who served as the lead scout of the Wilson Patrol, sensed a trap and advised Wilson to withdraw, but Wilson ordered his patrol to advance.

Soon afterwards, the patrol found the king and Wilson sent a message back to the laager requesting reinforcements. Forbes, however, was unwilling to set off across the river in the dark, so he sent only 20 more men, under the command of Henry Borrow, to reinforce Wilson's patrol. Forbes intended to send the main body of troops and artillery across the river the following morning; however, the main column was ambushed by Matabele warriors and delayed. Wilson's patrol too came under attack, but the Shangani River had swollen and there was now no possibility of retreat. In desperation, Wilson sent Burnham and two other men, Pearl "Pete" Ingram (a Montana cowboy) and William Gooding (an Australian), to cross the Shangani River, find Forbes, and bring reinforcements. In spite of a shower of bullets and spears, the three made it to Forbes, but the battle raging there was just as intense as the one they had left, and there was no hope of anyone reaching Wilson in time. As Burnham loaded his rifle to beat back the Matabele warriors, he quietly said to Forbes, "I think I may say that we are the sole survivors of that party." Wilson, Borrow, and their men were indeed surrounded by hundreds of Matabele warriors; escape was impossible, and all were killed.

Colonial-era histories called this the Shangani Patrol, and hailed Wilson and Borrow as national heroes. Their last stand together became a kind of national myth, as Lewis Gann writes, "a glorious memory, [Rhodesia's] own equivalent of the bloody Alamo massacre and Custer's Last Stand in the American West". The version of events recorded by history is based on the accounts of Burnham, Ingram and Gooding, the Matabele present at the battle (particularly inDuna Mjaan), and the men of Forbes' column. While all of the direct evidence given by eyewitnesses supports the findings of the Court of Inquiry, some historians and writers debate whether or not Burnham, Ingram and Gooding really were sent back by Wilson to fetch help, and suggest that they might have simply deserted when the battle got rough. The earliest recording of this claim of desertion is long after the event in a letter written in 1935 by John Coghlan to a friend, John Carruthers, that "a very reliable man informed me that Wools-Sampson told him" that Gooding had confessed on his deathbed that he and the two Americans had not actually been dispatched by Wilson, and had simply left on their own accord. This double hearsay confession, coming from an anonymous source, is not mentioned in Gooding's 1899 obituary, which instead recounts the events as generally recorded. Several well-known writers have used the Coghlan letter, as shaky as it is, as clearance to create hypothetical evidence in an attempt to challenge and revise the historical record.

All of the officers and troopers of Forbes' column had high praise for Burnham's actions, and none reported any doubts about his conduct even decades later. One member of the column, Trooper M E Weale, told the Rhodesia Herald in 1944 that once Commandant Piet Raaff took over command from the disgraced Major Forbes it was greatly due to Burnham's good scouting that the column managed to get away: "I have always felt that the honours were equally divided between these two men, to whom we owed our lives on that occasion." For his service in the war, Burnham was presented the British South Africa Company Medal, a gold watch, and a share of a 300-acre (120 ha) tract of land in Matabeleland. It was here that Burnham uncovered many artifacts in the huge granite ruins of the ancient civilization of Great Zimbabwe. Matabeleland became part of the Company domain, which was formally named Rhodesia, after Rhodes, in 1895. Matabeleland and Mashonaland became collectively called Southern Rhodesia.

=== Northern Rhodesia exploration ===
In 1895, Burnham oversaw and led the Northern Territories British South Africa Exploration Company expedition that first established for the British South Africa Company that major copper deposits existed north of the Zambezi in North-Eastern Rhodesia. Along the Kafue River, Burnham saw many similarities to copper deposits he had worked in the United States, and he encountered native peoples wearing copper bracelets. After this expedition he was elected a fellow of the Royal Geographical Society. Later, the British South Africa Company built the mining towns of the Copperbelt and a railroad to transport the ore through Portuguese Mozambique.

=== Second Matabele War ===
Burnham is the finest scout who ever scouted in Africa. He was my Chief of Scouts in '96 in Matabeleland and he was the eyes and ears of my force.

— General Carrington, British Army commander during the Second Matabele War

In March 1896, the Matabele again rose up against the British South Africa Company administration in what became called the Second Matabele War or the First Chimurenga (liberation war). Mlimo, the Matabele spiritual leader, is credited with fomenting much of the anger that led to this confrontation. The colonists' defenses in Matabeleland were undermanned due to the ill-fated Jameson Raid into the South African Republic (or Transvaal), and in the first few months of the war alone hundreds of white settlers were killed. With few troops to support them, the settlers quickly built a laager in the centre of Bulawayo on their own and mounted patrols under such figures as Burnham, Robert Baden-Powell, and Frederick Selous. The Matabele retreated into their stronghold of the Matopos Hills near Bulawayo, a region that became the scene of the fiercest fighting between Matabele warriors and settler patrols. It was also during this war that two scouts of very different backgrounds, Burnham and Baden-Powell, would first meet and discuss ideas for training youth that would eventually become the plan for the program and the code of honor for the Boy Scouts.

==== Assassination of Mlimo ====
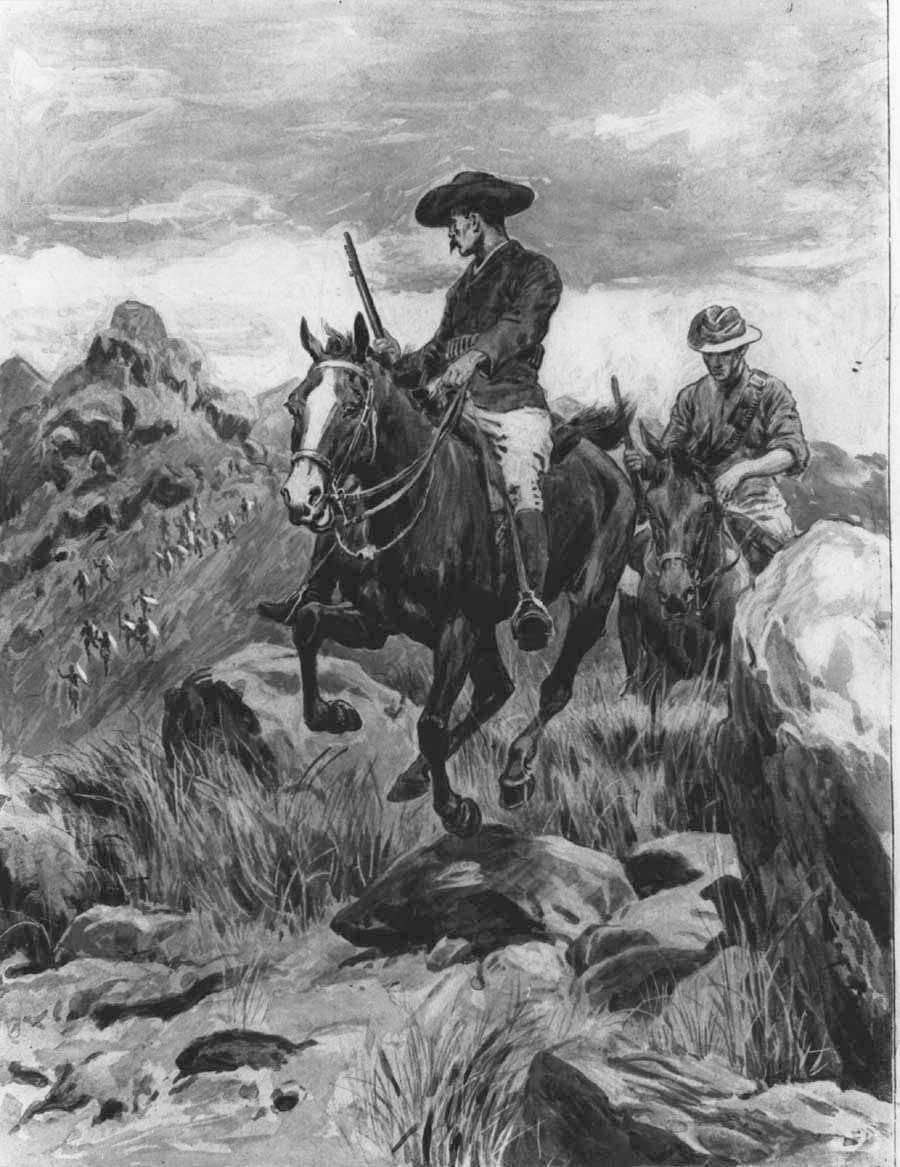
Burnham and Armstrong ride for Bulawayo after killing Mlimo, pursued by Matabele warriors.

The turning point in the war came when Burnham and Bonar Armstrong, a company native commissioner, found their way through the Matopos Hills to a sacred cave not many miles from the Mangwe district, to a sanctuary then known only to the Matabele where Mlimo had been hiding. Not far from the cave was a village (now gone) of about 100 huts filled with many warriors. The two men tethered their horses to a thicket and crawled on their bellies, screening their slow, cautious movements by means of branches held before them. Once inside the cave, they waited until Mlimo entered. Mlimo was said to be about 60 years old, with very dark skin, sharp-featured; American news reports of the time described him as having a cruel, crafty look. Burnham and Armstrong waited until Mlimo entered the cave and started his dance of immunity, at which point Burnham shot Mlimo just below the heart, killing him.

Burnham and Armstrong leapt over the dead Mlimo and ran down a trail toward their horses. The warriors in the village nearby picked up their arms and searched for the attackers; to distract them, Burnham set fire to some of their huts. The two men escaped and rode back to Bulawayo. Shortly after, Cecil Rhodes walked unarmed into the Matabele stronghold and made peace with the rebels, ending the Second Matabele War.

=== Klondike Gold Rush ===
With the Matabele wars over, Burnham decided it was time to leave Africa and move on to other adventures. The family returned to California. Soon after, Fred traveled to Alaska and the Yukon to prospect in the Klondike Gold Rush, taking with him his eldest son Roderick, who was then 12 years old. On hearing of the Spanish–American War, Burnham rushed home to volunteer his services, but the war had ended before he could get to the fighting. Burnham returned to the Klondike having played no part in the war. Colonel Theodore Roosevelt regretted this as much as Burnham and paid him a great tribute in his book.

=== Second Boer War ===
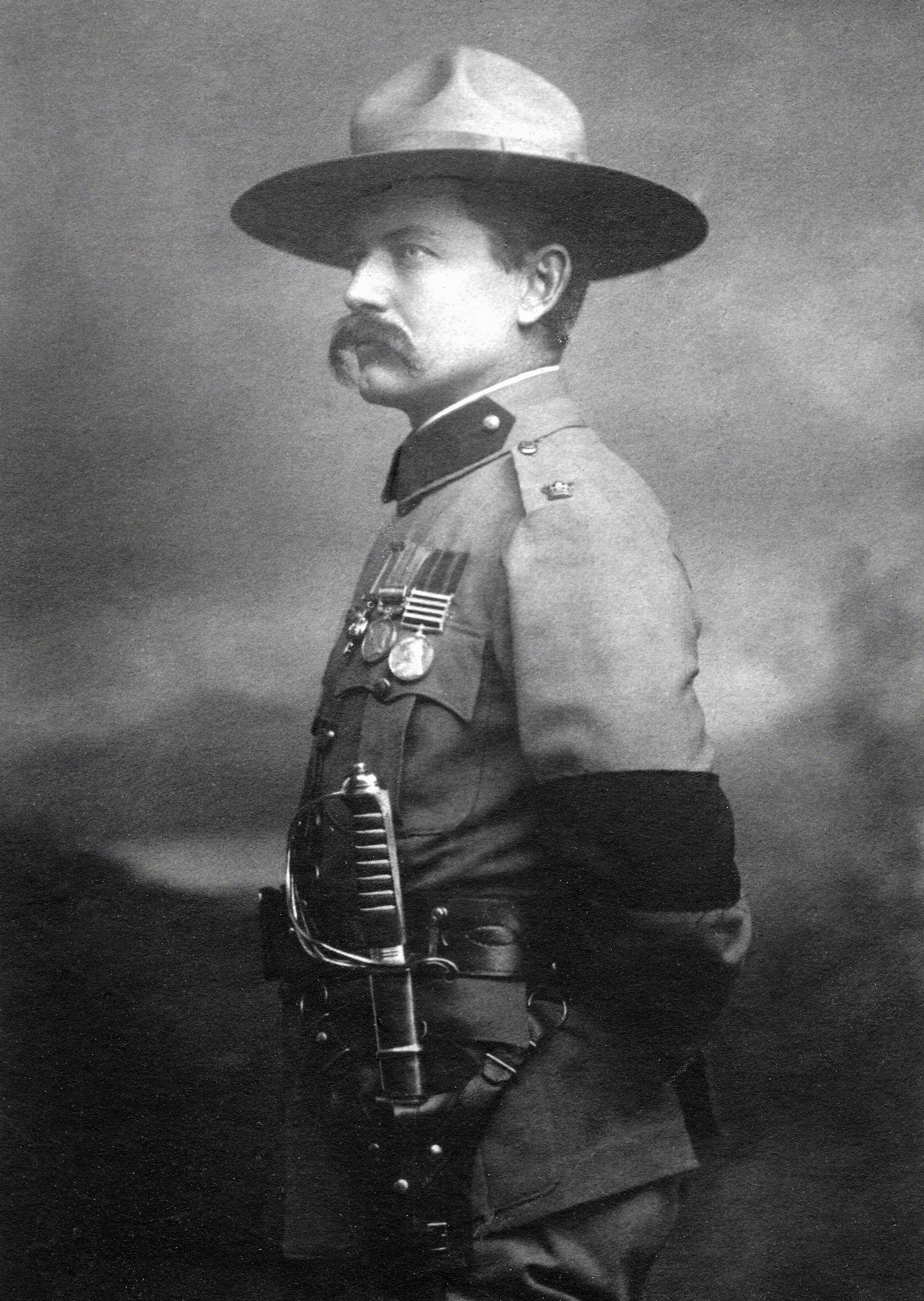
Burnham after his investiture with the cross of the Distinguished Service Order by King Edward VII. The black armband was worn in mourning for the recent death of Queen Victoria. London, 1901.

The Second Boer War (October 1899 – May 1902) was fought between the British and two independent Boer republics, the South African Republic and the Orange Free State, partly the result of long-simmering strife between them. It was directly caused by each side's desire to control the lucrative Witwatersrand gold mines in the Transvaal. Field Marshal Frederick Roberts, one of the British Army's most successful commanders of the 19th century, was appointed to take overall command of British forces, relieving General Redvers Buller, following a number of Boer successes in the early weeks of the war, including the Siege of Mafeking, in which Baden-Powell, his small regiment of men, and the townspeople had been besieged by thousands of Boer troops since the conflict began. Roberts asked General Frederick Carrington, who had commanded the British forces in Matabeleland three years earlier, whom he should appoint as his Chief of Scouts in South Africa. Carrington had selected Burnham for this role and advised Roberts to do the same, describing Burnham as "the finest scout who ever scouted in Africa."

Roberts sent for Burnham soon after arriving in South Africa on the RMS Dunottar Castle. The American scout was prospecting near Skagway, Alaska, when he received the following telegram in January 1900: "Lord Roberts appoints you on his personal staff as Chief of Scouts. If you accept, come at once the quickest way possible." Cape Town is at the opposite end of the globe from the Klondike, so Burnham left immediately departing on the very same boat that had brought him the telegram. In an unusual step for a foreigner, Burnham received a command post from Roberts and the British Army rank of captain. Burnham reached the front just before the Battle of Paardeberg (February 1900). During the war, Burnham spent much time behind the Boer lines gathering information and blowing up railway bridges and tracks. He was captured twice (escaping both times), and also temporarily disabled at one point by near-fatal wounds.

Burnham was first captured during the fighting at Sanna's Post in the Orange Free State. He gave himself up in order to obtain information on the enemy, which he did, and then he escaped from his guards and succeed in reaching British occupied Bloemfontein safely after two days and nights on the run. The second time he was captured was while trying to warn a British column approaching Thaba' Nchu. He came upon a group of Boers hiding on the banks of the river, toward which the British were even then advancing. Cut off from his own side, Burnham chose to signal the approaching soldiers even though it would expose him to capture. With a red kerchief, Burnham signaled the soldiers to turn back, but the column paid no attention and plodded steadily on into the ambush, while Burnham was at once taken prisoner. In the fight that followed, Burnham pretended to receive a wound in the knee, limping heavily and groaning with pain. He was placed in a wagon with the officers who really were wounded and who, in consequence, were not closely guarded. Later that evening, Burnham slipped over the driver's seat, dropped between the two wheels of the wagon, lowered himself, and fell between the legs of the oxen on his back in the road. In an instant, the wagon had passed over him safely, and while the dust still hung above the trail he rolled rapidly over into the ditch at the side of the road and lay motionless. It was four days before he was able to re-enter the British lines, during which time he had been lying in the open veld. He had subsisted on one biscuit and two handfuls of "mielies" (i.e., maize).

I take this opportunity of thanking you for the valuable services you have rendered since you joined my headquarters at Paardeburg last February. I doubt if any other man in the force could have successfully carried out the perilous enterprises on which you have from time to time been engaged demanding as they did the training of a lifetime, combined with exceptional courage, caution, and powers of endurance.

— Lord Roberts, Commander of all British troops fighting in the Second Boer War (1900) (Note: Hales, Van Wyk, and Britt all provide slight variations on this quote. The quote cited here comes from a facsimile of a handwritten letter from Lord Roberts to Major Burnham. The complete text of the letter is as follows: "Army Head Quarters, Pretoria, June 25, 1900. Dear Major Burnham, As you are about to return to Europe, I take this opportunity of thanking you for the valuable service you have performed since you joined my head quarters at Paaderburg last February. I doubt if any other man in the force could have successfully carried out the perilous enterprises on which you have from time to time been engaged demanding as they did the training of a lifetime, combined with exceptional courage, caution and powers of endurance. I was sorry to hear of the serious accident you met with in your last successful attempt on the enemy's line of railway, and I ____ to hear that you are quite well again. Believe me your _____ Roberts")

On June 2, 1900, during the British march on Pretoria, Burnham was wounded, almost fatally. He was on a mission to cut off the flow of Boer gold and supplies to and from the sea and to halt the transportation of British prisoners of war out of Pretoria. He scouted alone far to the east behind enemy lines trying to identify the best choke point along the Pretoria–Delagoa Bay railway line. He came upon an underpass of a railway bridge, an ideal location to disrupt the trains, but was immediately surrounded by a party of Boers. Burnham instantly fled and he had almost escaped when his horse was shot and fell, knocking him senseless and pinning him under its dead body. It was night and he was already far away when his horse was shot, so the Boer troopers apparently did not check to see if Burnham had been injured or killed. When he awoke hours later, Burnham was alone and in a dazed state having sustained serious injuries. In spite of his acute agony, Burnham proceeded to creep back to the railway, placed his charges, and blew up the line in two places. He then crept on his hands and knees to an empty animal enclosure to avoid capture and stayed there for two days and nights insensible. The next day, Burnham heard fighting in the distance so he crawled in that direction. By this time he was indifferent as to the source of the gunshots and by chance it was a British patrol that found him. Once in Pretoria the surgeons discovered that Burnham had torn apart his stomach muscles and burst a blood-vessel. His very survival was due only to the fact that he had been without food or water for three days.

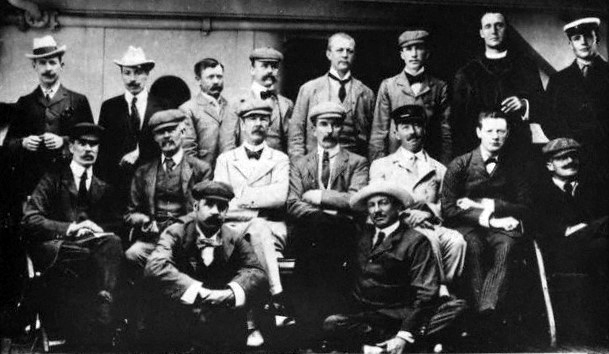
Returning from the Boer War on the RMS Dunottar Castle, July 1900. Burnham standing, third from left. Hover your mouse over each man for his name; click for more details.

Burnham's injuries were so serious that he was ordered to England by Lord Roberts. Two days before leaving for London, he was promoted to the rank of major, having received letters of commendation or congratulations from Baden-Powell, Rhodes, and Field Marshal Roberts. On his arrival in England, Burnham was commanded to dine with Queen Victoria and to spend the night at Osborne House. A few months later, after the Queen's death, King Edward VII personally presented Burnham with the Queen's South Africa Medal with four bars for the battles at Driefontein (March 10, 1900), Johannesburg (May 31, 1900), Paardeberg (February 17–26, 1900), and Cape Colony (October 11, 1899 – May 31, 1902), in addition to the cross of the Distinguished Service Order, the second highest decoration in the British Army, for his heroism during the "victorious" march to Pretoria (June 2–5, 1900). The King also made his British Army appointment and rank permanent, in spite of his U.S. citizenship. Burnham received the highest awards of any American who served in the Second Boer War. Following his investiture, the British press hailed him as: "The King of Army Scouts".

== "Father of Scouting" ==
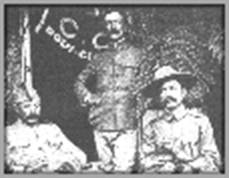
Burnham (standing) and Baden-Powell (right) at a Boy Scout event, ca. 1910

Burnham was already a celebrated scout when he first befriended Baden-Powell during the Second Matabele War, but the backgrounds of these two scouts was as strange a contrast as it is possible to imagine. From his youth on the open plains, Burnham's earliest playmates were Sioux Indian boys and their ambitions pointed to excelling in the lore and arts of the trail and together they dreamed of some day becoming great scouts. When Burnham was a teenager he supported himself by hunting game and making long rides for Western Union through the California deserts, his early mentors were wise old scouts of the American West, and by 19 he was a seasoned scout chasing and being chased by Apache. The British scout he would later befriend and serve with in Matabeleland, Baden-Powell, was born in London and had graduated from Charterhouse, one of England's most famous public schools. Baden-Powell developed an ambition to become a scout at an early age. He passed an exam that gave him an immediate commission into the British Army when he was 19, but it would take several years before he was engaged in any active service. When the two men met in 1896, Baden-Powell was an army intelligence officer and a brilliant outdoorsman who had organized a small scouting section in his regiment, written a book called Reconnaissance and Scouting (1884) and served in India, Afghanistan, Natal and Ashanti. Burnham, meanwhile, was General Carrington's Chief of Scouts.

Frederick Russell Burnham: Explorer, discoverer, cowboy, and Scout. Native American, he served as chief of scouts in the Boer War, an intimate friend of Lord Baden-Powell. It was on some of his exploits demanding great courage, alertness, skill in surmounting the perils of the out-of-doors, that the founder of Scouting based some of the activities of the Boy Scout program. As an honorary Scout of the Boy Scouts of America, he has served as an inspiration to the youth of the Nation and is the embodiment of the qualities of the ideal Scout.

— 27th Annual Report of the Boy Scouts of America (BSA) (1936)

During the siege of Bulawayo, these two men rode many times into the Matopos Hills on patrol, and it was in these hills that Burnham first introduced Baden-Powell to the ways and methods of the Native Americans, and taught him "woodcraft" (better known today as Scoutcraft). Baden-Powell had written at length about reconnaissance and tracking, but from Burnham he learned many new dimensions such as how to travel in wild country without either a compass or map, how to discover nearby dangers by observing animals, and the many techniques for finding potable water. So impressed was Baden-Powell by Burnham's Scouting spirit that he closely listened to all he had to tell. It was also here that Baden-Powell began to wear his signature Stetson campaign hat and neckerchief, like those worn by Burnham, for the first time. Both men recognized that wars were changing markedly and that the British Army needed to adapt. During their joint scouting missions, Baden-Powell and Burnham discussed the concept of a broad training program in woodcraft for young men, rich in exploration, tracking, fieldcraft, and self-reliance. In Africa, no scout embodied these traits more than Burnham.

In his first scouting handbook, Aids to Scouting (1899), Baden-Powell published many of the lessons he learned from Burnham and this book was later used by boys' groups as a guide to outdoor fun. At the urging of several youth leaders, Baden-Powell decided to adapt his scouting handbook specifically to training boys. While Baden-Powell went on to refine the concept of Scouting, publish Scouting for Boys (1908), and become the founder of the international Scouting movement, Burnham has been called the movement's father. James E. West, Chief Scout Executive for the Boy Scouts of America (BSA), summarized Burnham's historical relevance to Scouting: "There is an especial significance for those of us in Scouting in this man's list, for he was engaged for this work by Lord Baden Powell, who was then connected with the British Army in Africa, and who had unbounded admiration for the scouting methods of Frederick Burnham. So these two pioneers, each of whom was to have such immeasurable influence in restoring the old traditions of American youth, met in Africa, years before the Scouting movement was ever thought of."

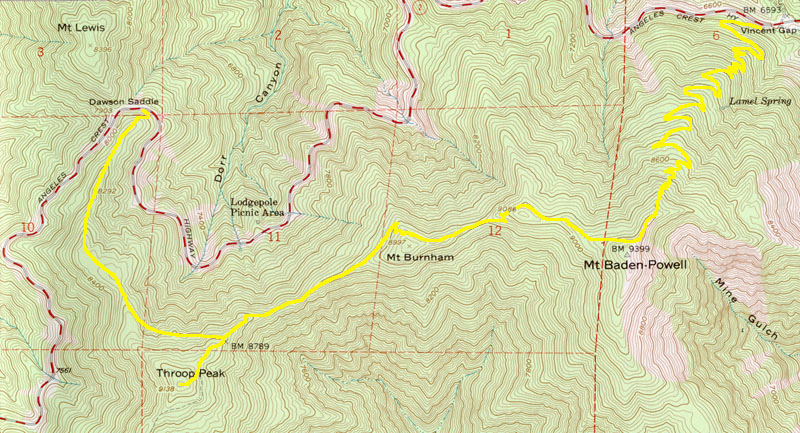
U.S. Geological Survey topographical map of the Boy Scout park service trail in California that connects Throop Peak, Mount Burnham, and Mount Baden-Powell

Burnham later became close friends with others involved in the Scouting movement in the United States, such as Theodore Roosevelt, the Chief Scout Citizen, and Gifford Pinchot, the Chief Scout Forester, and E. B. DeGroot [sic! (Note: Edward Burton DeGroot (1872–1949) See more at →)], BSA Scout Executive of Los Angeles. DeGroot said of Burnham: "Here is the sufficient and heroic figure, model and living example, who inspired and gave Baden-Powell the plan for the program and the code of honor of Scouting for Boys." With assistance from Baden-Powell, the BSA published his biography: He-who-sees-in-the-dark; the Boys' Story of Frederick Burnham, the American Scout. The BSA made Burnham an Honorary Scout in 1927, and for his noteworthy and extraordinary service to the Scouting movement, Burnham was bestowed the highest commendation given by the BSA, the Silver Buffalo Award, in 1936. Throughout his life he remained active in Scouting at both the regional and the national level in the United States and he corresponded regularly with Baden-Powell on Scouting topics.

Burnham and Baden-Powell remained close friends for their long lives. Burnham called Baden-Powell a "wonderfully able scout", and nicknamed him "Sherlock Holmes." Baden-Powell considered Burnham to be "the greatest scout alive." The seal on the Burnham–Baden-Powell letters at Yale and Stanford expired in 2000 and the true depth of their friendship and love of Scouting has again been revealed. In 1931, Burnham read the speech dedicating Mount Baden-Powell, California, to his old Scouting friend. Their friendship, and equal status in the world of Scouting and conservation, was honored in 1951 with the dedication of the adjoining peak as Mount Burnham.

Burnham's descendants followed in his footsteps and are active in Scouting and in the military. His son Roderick enlisted in the U.S. Army and he fought in France in World War I. His grandson, Frederick Russell Burnham II, was a leader in the BSA and a Vietnam War veteran. His great-grandson, Russell Adam Burnham, is an Eagle Scout and was the United States Army's Soldier of the Year in 2003.

== Later life ==
=== Post war ===
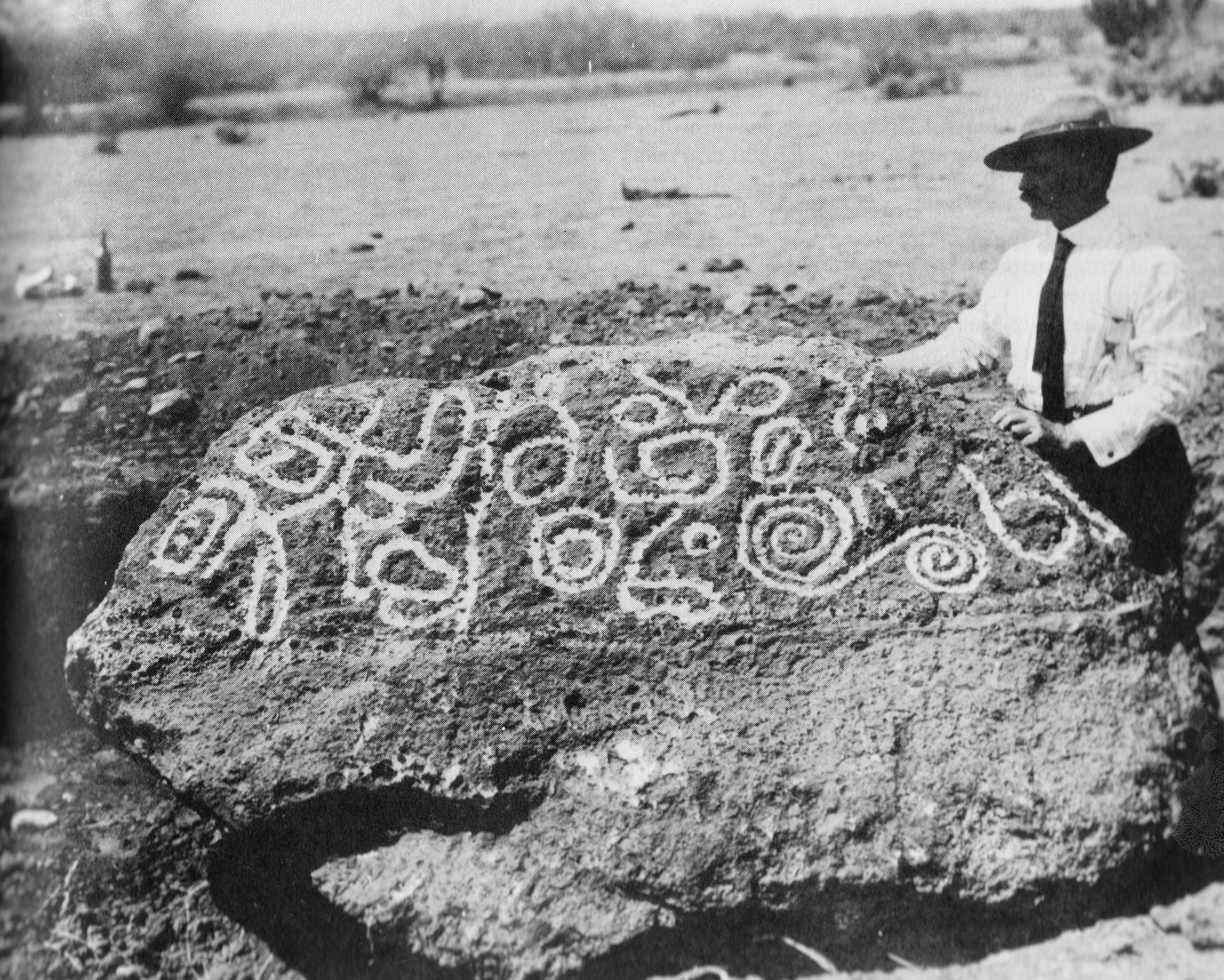
The mysterious Esperanza Stone. Found by Burnham in Mexico in 1909

After convalescing, Burnham became the London office manager for the Wa Syndicate, a commercial body with interests in the Gold Coast and neighboring territories in West Africa. He led the Wa Syndicate's 1901 expedition through the Gold Coast and the Upper Volta, looking for minerals and ways to improve river navigation. Between 1902 and 1904 he was employed by the East Africa Syndicate, for which he led a vast mineral prospecting expedition in the East Africa Protectorate (Kenya). Traveling extensively in the area around Lake Rudolf (now Lake Turkana), he discovered a huge soda lake.

=== Mexico ===
Burnham returned to North America and for the next few years became associated with the Yaqui River irrigation project in Mexico. While investigating the Yaqui valley for mineral and agricultural resources, Burnham reasoned that a dam could provide year-round water to rich alluvial soil in the valley; turning the region into one of the garden spots of the world and generate much needed electricity. He purchased water rights and some 300 acres (1.2 km^{2}) of land in this region and contacted an old friend from his time in Africa, John Hays Hammond, who conducted his own studies and then purchased an additional 900,000 acres (3,600 km^{2}) of this land—an area the size of Rhode Island. Burnham together with Charles Frederick Holder made important archaeological discoveries of Mayan civilization in this region, including the Esperanza Stone.

In 1909, William Howard Taft and Porfirio Díaz planned a summit in El Paso, Texas, and Ciudad Juárez, Mexico, an historic first meeting between a U.S. president and a Mexican president and also the first time an American president would cross the border into Mexico. But tensions rose on both sides of the border, including threats of assassination, so the Texas Rangers, 4,000 U.S. and Mexican troops, U.S. Secret Service agents, FBI agents and U.S. marshals were all called in to provide security. Burnham was put in charge of a private security detail, 250 men hired by Hammond, who in addition to owning large investments in Mexico was a close friend of Taft from Yale and a U.S. vice-presidential candidate in 1908. On October 16, the day of the summit, Burnham and Private C.R. Moore, a Texas Ranger, discovered a man holding a concealed palm pistol standing at the El Paso Chamber of Commerce building along the procession route. Burnham and Moore captured and disarmed the assassin within only a few feet of Taft and Díaz.

After the Taft-Díaz summit, Burnham led a team of 500 men in guarding mining properties owned by Hammond, J. P. Morgan, and the Guggenheims in the Mexican state of Sonora. Just as the irrigation and mining projects were nearing completion in 1912, a long series of Mexican revolutions began. The final blow to these efforts came in 1917 when Mexico passed laws prohibiting the sale of land to foreigners. Burnham and Hammond carried their properties until 1930 and then sold them to the Mexican government.

=== World War I ===
I know Burnham. He is a scout and a hunter of courage and ability, a man totally without fear, a sure shot, and a fighter. He is the ideal scout, and when enlisted in the military service of any country he is bound to be of the greatest benefit.

— President Theodore Roosevelt, 1901

During this period, Burnham was one of the 18 officers selected by former U.S. president Theodore Roosevelt to raise a volunteer infantry division for service in France in 1917 shortly after the United States entered the war. A plan to raise volunteer soldiers from the Western U.S. came out of a meeting of the New York-based Rocky Mountain Club and Burnham was put in charge of both the general organization and recruitment. Congress gave Roosevelt the authority to raise up to four divisions similar to the Rough Riders of 1st United States Volunteer Cavalry Regiment and to the British Army 25th (Frontiersmen) Battalion, Royal Fusiliers; however, as Commander-in-chief, President Woodrow Wilson refused to make use of Roosevelt's volunteers.

Roosevelt had been an outspoken critic of Wilson's neutrality policies, so even though Roosevelt had made several attempts to come to an agreement with Wilson, the President was unwilling to accept any compromise. In an astute political maneuver, Wilson announced to the press that he would not send Roosevelt and his volunteers to France, but instead would send an American Expeditionary Force under the command of General John Pershing. Roosevelt was left with no option except to disband the volunteers. He never forgave Wilson, and quickly published The Foes Of Our Own Household, a harsh indictment of the sitting president. These relentless attacks helped the Republicans win control of Congress in 1918. Roosevelt might have been a serious candidate for president in 1920 had he not died in 1919.

To my friendly enemy, Major Frederick Russell Burnham, the greatest scout of the world, whose eyes were that of an Empire. I once craved the honour of killing him, but failing that, I extend my heartiest admiration.

— Fritz Joubert Duquesne, 1933, One warrior to another

During World War I, Burnham was living in California and was active in counterespionage for Britain. Much of it involved a famous Boer spy, Captain Fritz Joubert Duquesne, who became a German spy in both World Wars and claimed to have killed Field Marshal Kitchener while en route to meet with the Russians. During the Second Boer War, Burnham and Duquesne were each under orders to assassinate the other, but it was not until 1910 that the two men first met while both were in Washington, D.C., separately lobbying Congress to pass a bill in favor of the importation of African game animals into the United States (H.R. 23621). Duquesne was twice arrested by the FBI and in 1942 he and 32 other Nazi agents (the Duquesne Spy Ring) were jailed for espionage in the largest spy ring conviction in U.S. history.

=== Oil wealth ===
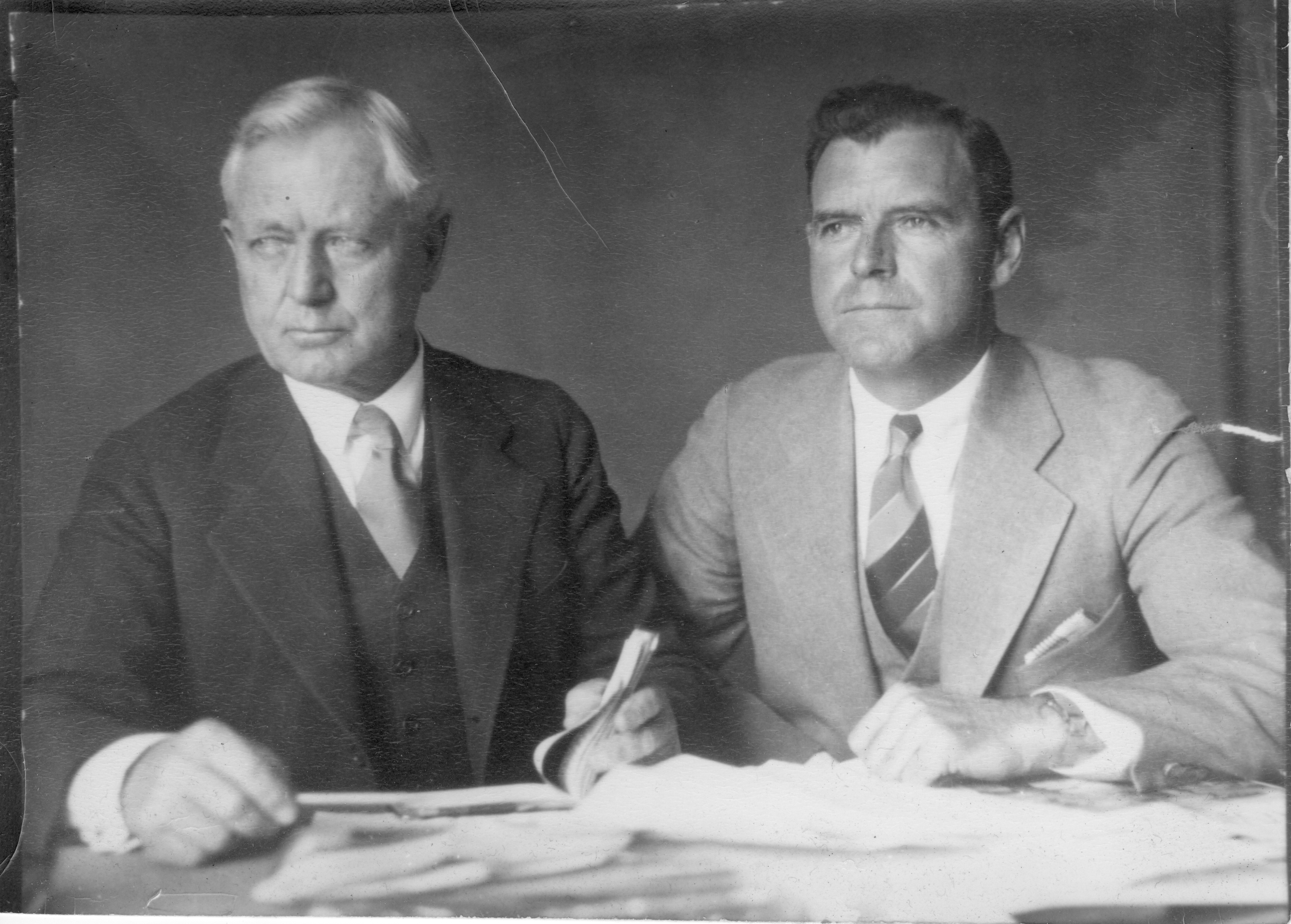
Fred and Rod Burnham, ca. 1930

Although Burnham had lived all over the world, he never had a great deal of wealth to show for his efforts. It was not until he returned to California, the place of his youth, that he found great affluence. In November 1923, he struck oil in Dominguez Hills, near Carson, California. In a field that covered just two square miles, over 150 wells from Union Oil were soon producing 37,000 barrels a day, with 10,000 barrels a day going to the Burnham Exploration Company, a syndicate formed in 1919 between Frederick Burnham, his son Roderick, John Hayes Hammond, and his son Harris Hammond. In the first 10 years of operation, the Burnham Exploration Company paid out $10.2 million in dividends. The spot where Burnham found oil was land where "as a small boy he used to graze cattle, and shoot game which he sold to the neighboring mining districts to support his widowed mother and infant brother." Many years after the oil was depleted, the land near the Dominguez field was re-developed and became the site of the California State University, Dominguez Hills. In 2010, Occidental Petroleum Corporation expressed interest in redeveloping the former Dominguez oil field using modern extraction technologies.

=== Conservation ===
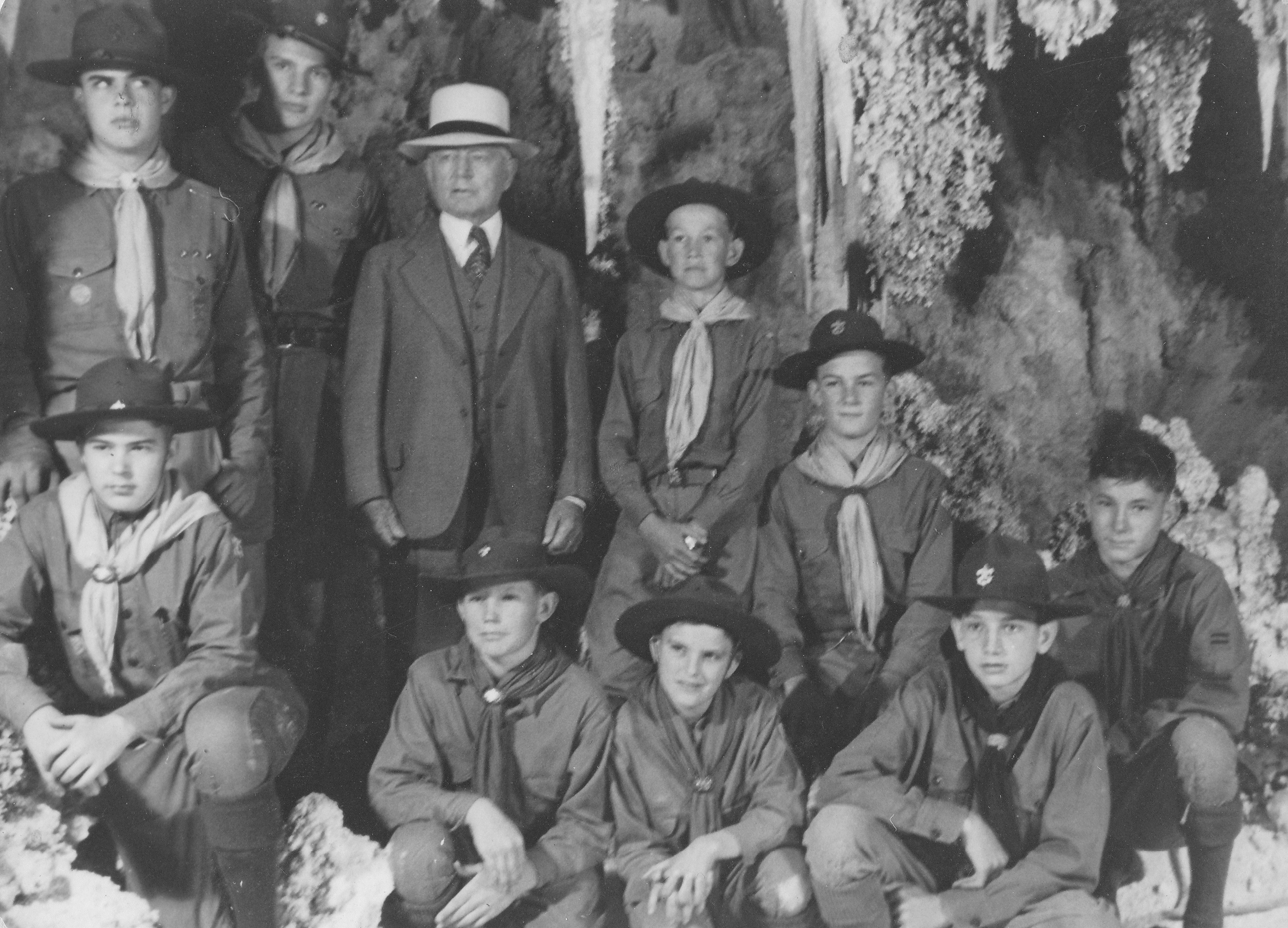
Celebrating his 80th birthday with Boy Scouts, Carlsbad Caverns National Park, 1941

An avid conservationist and hunter, Burnham supported the early conservation programs of his friends Theodore Roosevelt and Gifford Pinchot. He and his associate John Hayes Hammond led novel game expeditions to Africa with the goal of finding large animals such as Giant Eland, hippopotamus, zebra, and various bird species that might be bred in the United States and become game for future American sportsmen. Burnham, Hammond, and Duquesne appeared several times before the House Committee on Agriculture to ask for help in importing large African animals. In 1914, he helped establish the Wild Life Protective League of America, Department of Southern California, and served as its first Secretary.

In his later years, Burnham filled various public offices and also served as a member of the Boone and Crockett Club of New York, and as a founding member of the American Committee for International Wildlife Protection (now a committee of the World Conservation Union). He was one of the original members of the first California State Parks Commission (serving from 1927 to 1934), a founding member of the Save the Redwoods League, president of the Southwest Museum of Los Angeles from 1938 until 1940, and he served as both the Honorary President of the Arizona Boy Scouts and as a regional executive for the BSA throughout the 1940s until his death in 1947.

In 1936, Burnham enlisted the Arizona Boy Scouts in a campaign to save the Desert Bighorn Sheep from probable extinction. Several other prominent Arizonans and environmental groups joined the movement and a "save the bighorns" poster contest was started in schools throughout the state. Burnham provided prizes and appeared in store windows from one end of Arizona to the other. The contest-winning bighorn emblem was made into neckerchief slides for the 10,000 Boy Scouts, and talks and dramatizations were given at school assemblies and on radio. On January 18, 1939, over 1.5 million acres (6,100 km2) were set aside in Arizona to establish the Kofa National Wildlife Refuge and the Cabeza Prieta National Wildlife Refuge, and Burnham gave the dedication speech.

== Personal life ==
Coat of Arms of Frederick Russell Burnham

At 5 ft 4 in (1.62 m), Burnham was short, but he was also muscular and bronzed, with a finely formed square jaw. He had a boyish appearance which he used to his advantage on numerous occasions. His most noticeable feature was his steady, grey-blue eyes. Contemporary reports had it that Burnham's gaze appeared to never leave those of the person he was looking at, and yet somehow could simultaneously monitor all the details of the physical surroundings. It was also said that Burnham's eyes possessed a far-away look such as those acquired by people whose occupation has caused them to watch continually at sea or on great plains.

Burnham would not smoke and seldom drank alcohol, fearing these habits would injure the acuteness of his sense of smell. He found ways to train himself in mental patience, took power naps instead of indulging in periods of long sleep, and drank very little liquid. He trained himself to accept these abstinences in order to endure the most appalling fatigues, hunger, thirst, and wounds, so that when scouting or traveling where there was no water, he might still be able to exist. On more than one occasion he survived in environments where others would have died, or were in fact dying, of exhaustion. He was quiet-mannered and courteous, according to contemporaries. Their reports describe a man who was neither shy nor self-conscious, who was extremely modest, and who seldom spoke of his many adventures.

Burnham died of heart failure at the age of 86, on September 1, 1947, at his home in Santa Barbara, California. He was buried at a private ceremony at Three Rivers, California, near his old cattle ranch, La Cuesta. His memorial stone was designed by his only surviving child, Roderick. Also buried at Three Rivers cemetery are his first wife, Blanche, several members of the Blick family who had also pioneered 1890s Rhodesia with Burnham, Roderick, his granddaughter Martha Burnham Burleigh, and "Pete" Ingram, the Montana cowboy who had survived the Shangani Patrol massacre along with Burnham.

=== Family ===
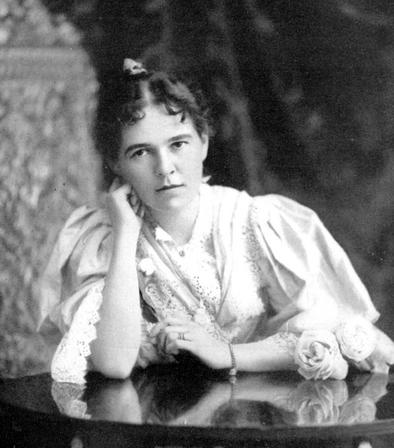
Blanche Blick Burnham in Bulawayo, Rhodesia, 1896

Burnham's wife of 55 years, Blanche (February 25, 1862 – December 22, 1939) of Nevada, Iowa, accompanied him in very primitive conditions through many travels in both the Southwest United States and southern Africa. Together they had three children, all of whom spent their early youth in Africa. In the early years, she watched over the children and the pack animals, and she always kept a rifle nearby. In the dark of night, she used her rifle many times against lions and hyena and, during the Siege of Bulawayo, against Matabele warriors. Several members of the Blick family joined the Burnhams in Rhodesia, moved with them to England, and returned to the United States with the Burnhams to live near Three Rivers, California. When Burnham Exploration Company struck it rich in 1923, the Burnhams moved to a mansion built by Pasadena architect Joseph Blick, his brother-in-law, in a new housing development then known as Hollywoodland (a name later shortened to "Hollywood") and took many trips around the world in high style. In 1939, Blanche suffered a stroke. She died a month later and was buried in the Three Rivers Cemetery.

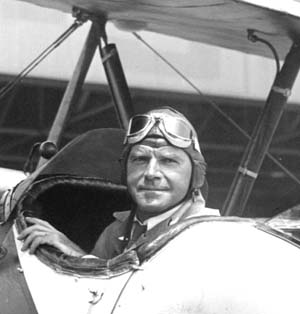
Rod Burnham, 1921

Burnham's first son, Roderick (August 22, 1886 – July 2, 1976), was born in Pasadena, California, but accompanied the family to Africa and learned the Matabele language, Sindebele. He went to boarding school in France in 1895, and then to a military school in England the following year. In 1898, he went to Skagway, Alaska with his father, and returned to Pasadena the next year. In 1904, he attended the University of California, Berkeley, joined the football team, but left Berkeley after a dispute with his coach. In 1905–08, he went to the University of Arizona, joined the Delta Kappa Epsilon fraternity, played the position of running back, and became the captain of the football team. He attended the Michigan School of Mines (now Michigan Technological University) in 1910, became a geologist, and worked for Union Oil as Manager of Lands and Foreign Exploration helping to develop the first wells in Mexico and Venezuela. He took time off from his job to serve in the U.S. Army in World War I and fought in France. He and his father became minority owners of the Burnham Exploration Company, incorporated in 1919 by Harris Hays Hammond (the son of John Hays Hammond, Sr). In 1930, he and Paramount Pictures founder W. W. Hodkinson started the Central American Aviation Corporation, the first airline in Guatemala.

Dedication

To the Memory of the Child: Nada Burnham, who "bound all to her" and, while her father cut his way through the hordes of the Ingobo Regiment, perished of the hardships of war at Buluwayo on 19 May 1896, I dedicate these tales—and more particularly the last, that of a Faith which triumphed over savagery and death.

— H. Rider Haggard, from his book: The Wizard (1896)

Nada (May 1894 – May 19, 1896), Burnham's daughter, was the first white child born in Bulawayo; she died of fever and starvation during the town's siege. She was buried three days later in the town's Pioneer Cemetery, plot No. 144. Nada is the Zulu word for lily and she was named after the heroine in Sir H. Rider Haggard's Zulu tale, Nada the Lily (1892). Three of Haggard's books are dedicated to Burnham's daughter, Nada: The Wizard (1896), Elissa: The Doom of Zimbabwe (1899), and Black Heart and White Heart: A Zulu Idyll (1900).

Burnham's youngest son, Bruce B. Burnham (1897 – October 3, 1905), was staying with his parents in London when he accidentally drowned in the River Thames. His brother, Roderick, was in California the night Bruce died, yet claimed to know from a dream exactly what had happened. Roderick awoke screaming and rushed to tell his grandmother about his nightmare. The next morning, a cable arrived with the news of Bruce's death.

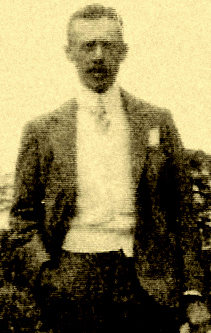
Howard Burnham, brother

His brother Howard Burnham (1870–1918), born shortly before the family moved to Los Angeles, lost one leg at the age of 14 and suffered from tuberculosis. During his teenage years he lived with Fred in California and learned from his brother the art of Scoutcraft, how to shoot, and how to ride the range, all in spite of his wooden leg. Howard moved to Africa, became a mining engineer in the Johannesburg gold mines, and later wrote a text book on Modern Mine Valuation. He traveled the world and for a time teamed up with Fred on Yaqui River irrigation project in Mexico. During World War I, Howard worked as a spy for the French government, operating behind enemy lines in southwest Germany. Throughout the war he used his wooden leg to conceal tools he needed for spying. From his death bed, Howard returned to France via Switzerland and shared his vital data and secrets with the French government: the Germans were not opening a new front in the Alps and there was no need to move allied troops away from the Western Front. Howard was buried at Cannes, France, leaving behind his wife and four children. He had been named after his second cousin, Lieutenant Howard Mather Burnham who was killed in action in the American Civil War.

Burnham's first cousin Charles Edward Russell (1860–1941) was a journalist and politician and also a founder of the National Association for the Advancement of Colored People (NAACP). The author of a number of books of biography and social commentary Russell won a Pulitzer Prize in 1928 for his biography: The American Orchestra and Theodore Thomas.

In 1943, at 83 years of age, Burnham married his much younger typist, Ilo K. Willits Burnham (June 20, 1894 – August 28, 1982). The couple sold their mansion and moved to Santa Barbara in 1946.

Burnham was a descendant of Thomas Burnham (1617–1688) of Hartford, Connecticut, the first American ancestor of a large number of Burnhams. The descendants of Thomas Burnham have been noted in every American war, including the French and Indian War.

== Film and stage accounts ==
In 1899, Frank E. Fillis brought his circus and stage show "Savage South Africa", featuring a number of Zulu performers, to the Empress Theatre at Earls Court in London as part of the "Greater Britain Exhibition". The actors dramatically played out famous battles from the Matabele wars twice a day. The program featured "Wilson's Heroic Stand at the Shangani River", a re-enactment of the battle of the Shangani Patrol. Fillis himself played Major Wilson, Peter Lobengula played the Matabele King Lobengula, and Burnham was played by the adopted son of Texas Jack Omohundro, "Texas Jack" Jr., who later ran a Wild West show in South Africa featuring the American cowboy and entertainer Will Rogers. The Shangani segment of the show was filmed in September 1899, and subsequently sold to movie houses around the world as Major Wilson's Last Stand. Years later, a feature-length Shangani Patrol (film) (1970) was released. The picture was shot on location in and around Bulawayo by RPM Film Studios and directed by David Millin. Burnham was portrayed by the American cowboy actor Will Hutchins of the ABC/Warner Brothers western series Sugarfoot, and the part of Major Wilson was played by the South African actor Brian O'Shaughnessy.

In late 1958, Ernest Hemingway acquired the rights to produce a film version of Burnham's memoirs, Scouting on Two Continents. CBS immediately contracted Hemingway to produce the film for television, with Gary Cooper expressing considerable interest in playing the part of Burnham. Hemingway was already behind schedule with other commitments, however, and no work had been done on the movie when he committed suicide in July 1961.

Another epic film, On My Honor, was conceived and begun by Cecil B. DeMille. It was to document the founding of the Scouting movement but was left unfinished after DeMille died in January 1959. The screenplay, by Jesse Lasky Jr., focused on Baden-Powell, Burnham and other pioneers who were to have a major influence on Scouting. After DeMille's death, associate producer Henry Wilcoxon continued to work on the film until 1962, hiring Sydney Box to assist with the script. Starting in 2001, producers Jerry Molen and Robert Starling began work to finish DeMille's project, using an updated screenplay by Starling based on the earlier work of Lasky and Box.

In June 2014, RatPac Entertainment and Class 5 Films acquired the non-fiction article American Hippopotamus, by Jon Mooallem, about the meat shortage in the U.S. in 1910 and the attempts made by Burnham, Fritz Duquesne and Congressman Robert Broussard to import hippopotamuses into the Louisiana bayous and to convince Americans to eat them. The movie will highlight the Burnham–Duquesne rivalry. Edward Norton, William Migliore and Brett Ratner will produce this feature film.

== Tributes ==
Burnham in real life is more interesting than any of my heroes of romance!

— Sir H. Rider Haggard

Sir H. Rider Haggard, inventor of the lost world literary genre, was heavily influenced by the larger than life adventures of his friend Burnham as he penned his fictional hero Allan Quatermain. There are many similarities between these two African explorers: both sought and discovered ancient treasures and civilizations, both battled large wild animals and native peoples, both were renowned for their ability to track, even at night, and both had similar nicknames: Quatermain was dubbed "Watcher-by-Night", while Burnham was called "He-who-sees-in-the-dark".

To commemorate 100 years of Scouting, the BSA issued 100 bronze coins in 2007 featuring Burnham and Baden-Powell. One side shows the bust of Burnham and is inscribed: "Major Frederick Russell Burnham", "Father of Scouting". Other side shows the bust of Baden-Powell and is inscribed: "Col. Robert Baden-Powell", "Founder of Scouting". The coins were distributed by the White Eagle District. Years earlier, the BSA helped create the Major Burnham Bowling Trophy, an annual bowling event sponsored by Union Oil and held in California. Serbelodon burnhami, an extinct gomphothere (Shovel-Tusker elephant) from California, was named after Burnham. It was discovered by John C. Blick, the brother of Burnham's first wife.

== See also ==
- List of books, articles and documentaries about snipers
- Francis Buzzacott, American hunter and explorer who served as a British army scout during the Zulu War

== Bibliography ==
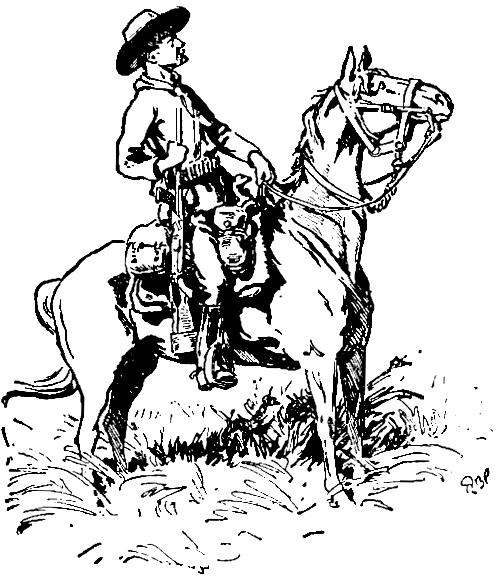
Baden-Powell's sketch of Chief of Scouts Burnham, Matopos Hills, 1896. Also used on the dust cover of Scouting on Two Continents. (1934 edition).

Burnham authored the following works:

- — (1926). Scouting on Two Continents (PDF). Garden City, New York: Doubleday. ISBN 978-1-879356-31-3.
- — (1927). "The Remarks of Major Frederick R. Burnham". Annual Publication of the Historical Society of Southern California. 13 (4): 334–352. doi:10.2307/41168823. JSTOR 41168823.
- —; Banning, William; Banning, George Hugh (1930). "Foreword". Six Horses. New York: Century. OCLC 1744707.
- — (1930). "The howl for cheap Mexican labor". In Grant, Madison; Charles Stewart, Davison (eds.). The Alien in Our Midst; Or, "Selling Our Birthright for a Mess of Pottage"; the Written Views of a Number of Americans (Present and Former) on Immigration and Its Results. New York: Galton Publishing. pp. 44–48. OCLC 3040493.
- — (1931). "Scouting Against the Apache". In West, James E (ed.). The Boy Scout's Book of True Adventure: their own story of famous exploits and adventures told by honorary scouts. New York: Putman. OCLC 8484128.
- — (1933). "Taps for the Great Selous". In Grinnell, George Bird; Roosevelt, Kermit; Cross, W. Redmond; Gray, Prentiss N. (eds.). Hunting Trails on Three Continents; a Book of the Boone and Crockett Club. New York: The Derrydale Press. OCLC 1624738.
- — (July 1938). "Madison Grant (Eulogy)". Boone and Crockett Club: 29–31. ISSN 1048-3586.
- — (1944). Taking Chances. Los Angeles, California: Haynes. ISBN 978-1-879356-32-0.
- — (November 1945). "The Fire that shall Never Die". Boys' Life. Boy Scouts of America. pp. 7, 35. ISSN 0006-8608.

== Notes ==
Footnotes

Source notes

- This article incorporates public domain material from a 1906 biography of Major Burnham: Davis, Richard Harding (1906). Real Soldiers of Fortune . New York: Charles Scribner's Sons. ISBN 978-0-87364-239-2.
