= Mount Burnham =

Peak in the San Gabriel Mountains

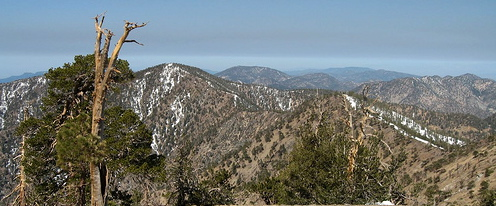
- Summit and ridge

Highest point
- Elevation: 9,001 ft (2,744 m) NAVD 88
- Listing: Hundred Peaks Section
- Coordinates: 34°21′33″N 117°46′53″W

Geography
- Location within California Location within the United States
- Location: Los Angeles County, California, U.S.
- Parent range: San Gabriel Mountains
- Topo map: USGS Crystal Lake

Climbing
- Easiest route: Hike

Mount Burnham is one of the highest peaks in the San Gabriel Mountains. It is in the Sheep Mountain Wilderness. It is named for Frederick Russell Burnham the famous American military scout who taught Scoutcraft (then known as woodcraft) to Robert Baden-Powell and became one of the inspirations for the founding of the Boy Scouts. Mount Burnham was officially recognized by the USGS at a dedication ceremony in 1951. It was original known as (West Twin) "North Baldy Mountain". The peak is within Los Angeles County, about 16 miles (26 km) north of Glendora, and 66 miles (106 km) from Los Angeles. In 1956, Mount Burnham was added to the list of Signature Summits by the Hundred Peaks Section of the Sierra Club.

== Background ==
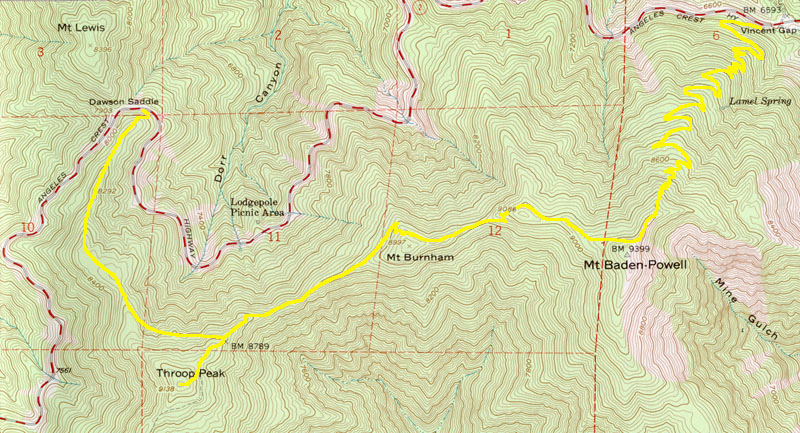
Trail connecting Mount Burnham to Mount Baden-Powell

The 53-mile (85 km) long Silver Moccasin Trail, a Boy Scout trail, connects the mountain with Mount Baden-Powell, Throop Peak and Mount Hawkins. The Pacific Crest Trail follows the same route in this area.

Most of the forest on Mount Burnham and along the trail consist of plants native to the region. The peak is covered by limber pine (Pinus flexilis), lodgepole (P. contorta), sugar pine (P. lambertiana), and Jeffrey pine (P. jeffreyi). Other plants of note include Holodiscus microphyllus, Monardella cinerea, Eriogonum umbellatum, Oreonana vestita, Cycladenia humilis, and the rare, local yellow-flowered Peirson's lupine (Lupinus peirsonii). The area is occasionally visited by bighorn sheep and a rare mountain lion.

Rocks in the area range in age from Pre-Cambrian (probable) igneous and metamorphics to Pre-Cretaceous metamorphics. The Vincent Thrust Fault, the oldest major fault in the range, dating to the Mesozoic, passes through the area.
