= Silver Moccasin Trail =

Angeles National Forest, California, U.S.

Coordinates: 34°18′23″N 118°00′37″W

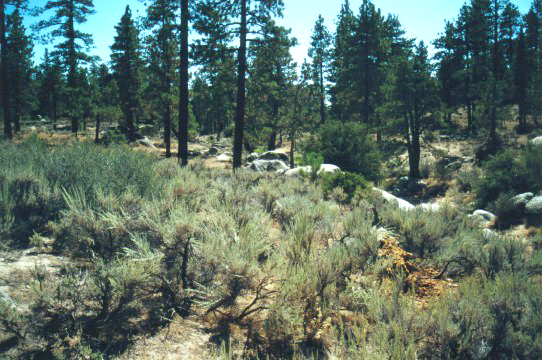
- View along the Silver Moccasin Trail
- Length: 53 mi (85 km)
- Location: Los Angeles County, California, USA
- Trailheads: Chantry Flat above Arcadia, California; Vincent Gap near Wrightwood, California.
- Use: Hiking, Backpacking
- Highest point: Mount Baden-Powell, 9,407 ft (2,867 m)
- Difficulty: Moderate to strenuous

Scout trail
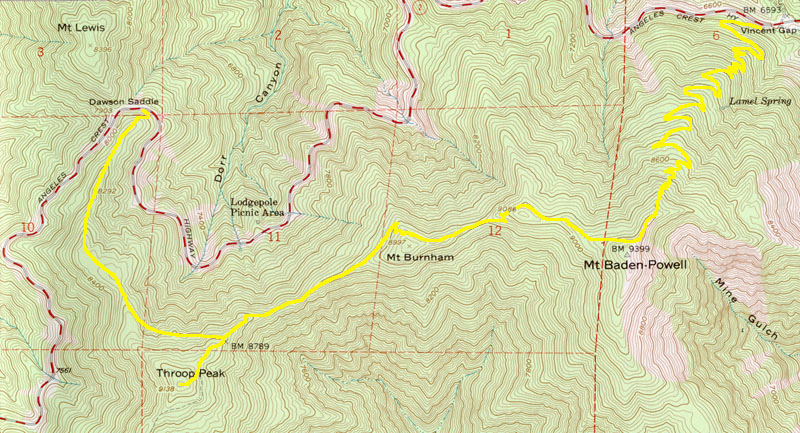
- Scout trail

The Silver Moccasin Trail is a 53-mile (85 km) trail located in the San Gabriel Mountains, northeast of Los Angeles. It begins at Chantry Flat Recreation Area above the city of Arcadia, California, traversing upward and down through several canyons and along the high ridges of the Angeles National Forest. This trail connects Mt. Baden-Powell, Mount Burnham, Throop Peak and Mount Hawkins. It comes to its highest point of 9,399 feet (2,865 m) at Mount Baden-Powell after which point it descends to its terminus at Vincent Gap on the Angeles Crest Highway near Wrightwood.

== Background ==
The landscape of the Silver Moccasin Trail varies from lowland chaparral slopes, to oak-lined canyons, to the fir and pine forests of Mt. Baden-Powell, where several Southern California councils of the Boy Scouts of America have placed a monument to their founder, Lord Robert Baden-Powell.

The Silver Moccasin Trail started as a series of Indian trails originally created by the local Native Americans (probably Tongva), but its use was continued by Anglo settlers who either hunted or hiked along its route. In 1942, the Los Angeles Area Council of Boy Scouts established a designated route as the Silver Moccasin Trail, and any Scouts who complete the hike, usually involving several days travel, are qualified to receive the Silver Moccasins Award. Boy Scouts, especially those who are enrolled in "hiking troops," walk this trail usually as part of a five-day backpack trip.

Silver Moccasins Trail Award

The LA Area Council, BSA map that was printed before 1953 (has the name "Flores" in the corner) showed a 60 mile route. It started at the end of the Pacific Electric rail line At Grand View Avenue (6 miles from Chantry Flat). The trail ended at Camp Pepperdine (elevation 6150 ft elevation) near Jackson Lake. The map identifies the six USGS topographic maps for the trail (Sierra Madre, Mt. Wilson, Alder Creek, Waterman Mtn, Crystal Lake, and Mt Baden Powell Quadrangles). The map showed the Mt Baden Powell summit as a short side trip off the main trail.

Alternate starting points, or trailheads, have been established for the SMT more than likely due to overuse or overcrowding at Chantry Flat, which has somewhat reduced the adventuresome attractiveness of the younger, less-traveled version. However, sections of the trail which are only 8 miles (13 km) to 10 miles (16 km) in length while reaching the Baden-Powell summit qualify it as a 20-mile (32 km) (flatland) hike due to gains in elevation which are about 5,000 feet (1,500 m). The Baden-Powell portions of the hike are also beneficial for acclimation to altitudes for beginning hikers who may experience mild altitude sickness between 8,000 feet (2,400 m) and 9,000 feet (2,700 m).

== Segments ==
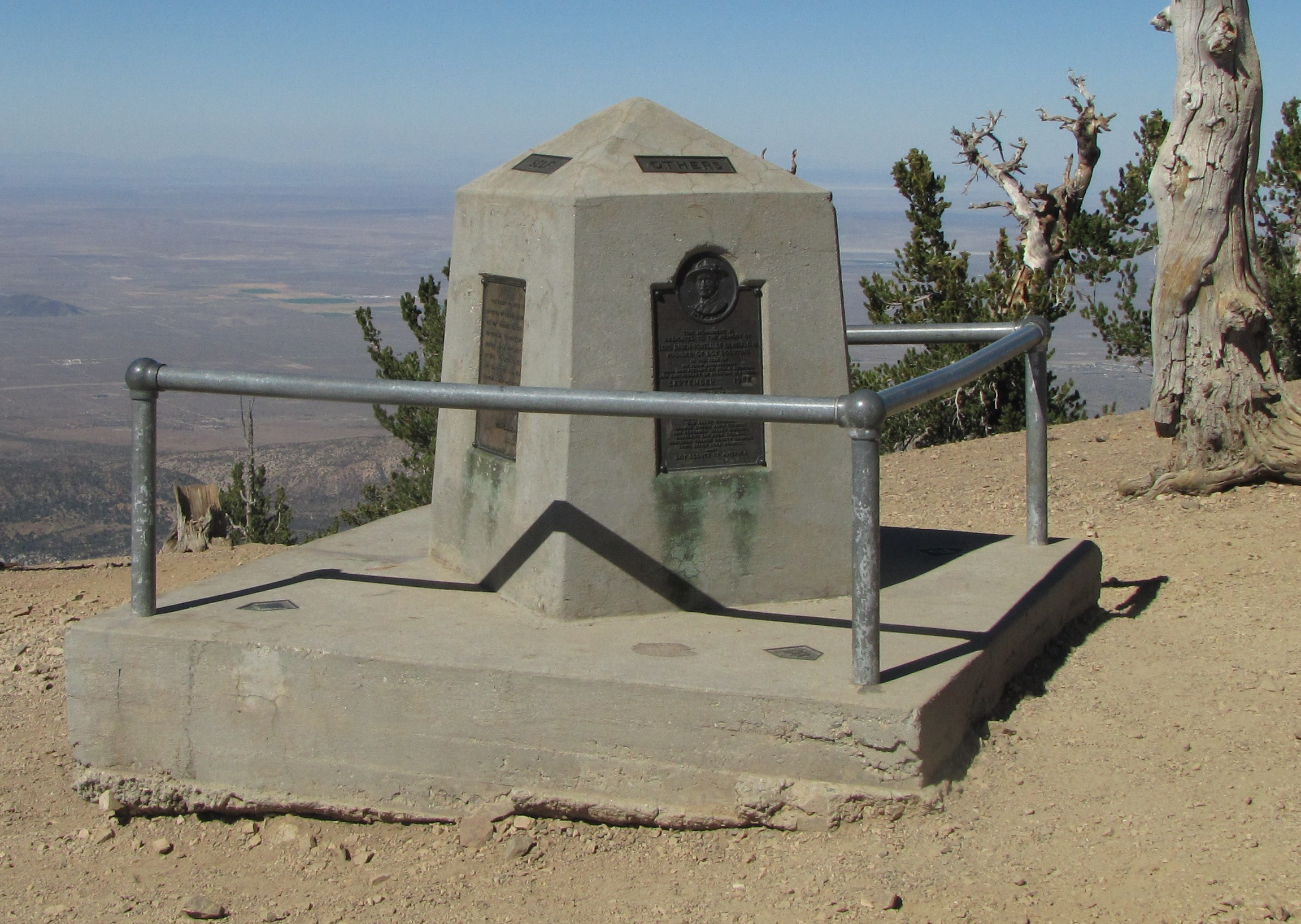
Baden Powell Memorial

The following segments are listed from the Chantry Flats starting point to the Vincent Gap terminus and show "via routes" and the one-way mileage:

- Chantry Flat to West Fork CG via Gabrielino Trail ... 9 miles (14 km)
- West Fork CG to Angeles Crest Hwy via Shortcut Canyon ... 3 miles (4.8 km)
- Angeles Crest Hwy to Chilao Flat through Charlton Flat ... 7 miles (11 km)
- Chilao Flat to Three Points passes Horse Flats CG ... 5 miles (8.0 km)
- Three Points to Cloudburst Summit via Pacific Crest Trail ... 4 miles (6.4 km)
- Cloudburst Summit to Islip Saddle via Pacific Crest Trail ... 11 miles (18 km)
- Islip Saddle to Mt Baden-Powell via Pacific Crest Trail ... 10 miles (16 km)
- Mt Baden-Powell to Vincent Gap via Pacific Crest Trail ... 4 miles (6.4 km)

== See also ==
- Gabrielino Trail
- Silver Knapsack Trail
