= Esperanza Stone =

Mexican stone with mysterious markings, discovered in 1909

- Hope Stone
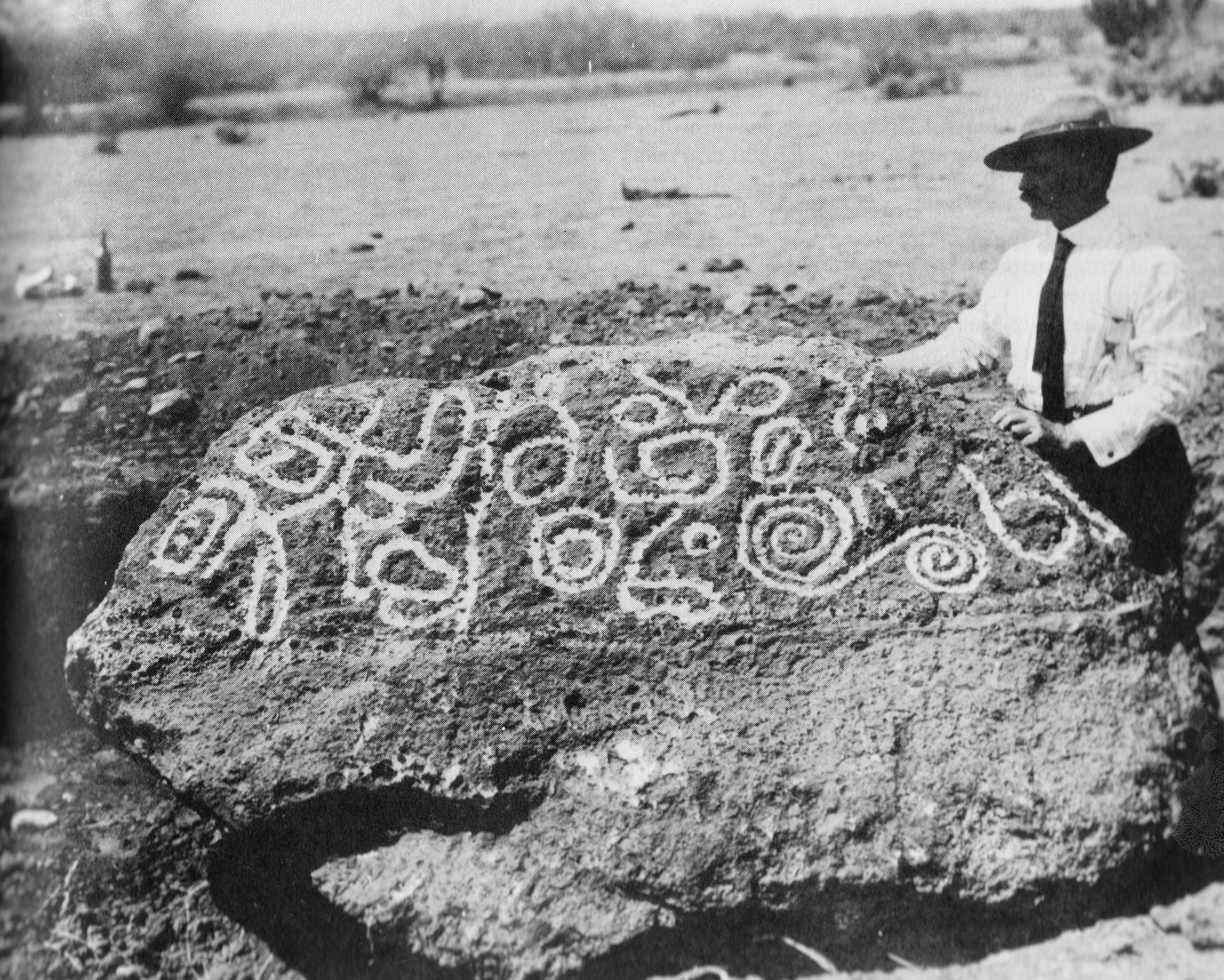
- Major Burnham standing next to the stone, with the inscription outlined in chalk.
- Interactive map of Esperanza Stone
- Location: Yaqui River valley
- Type: stone
- Material: igneous rock
- Length: 8 feet (2.4 m)
- Opening date: 1909

The Esperanza Stone was a large (8-feet long) inscribed stone found in the valley of the Yaqui, Mexico. It was discovered and excavated in 1909 by Major F. R. Burnham and Charles Frederick Holder.

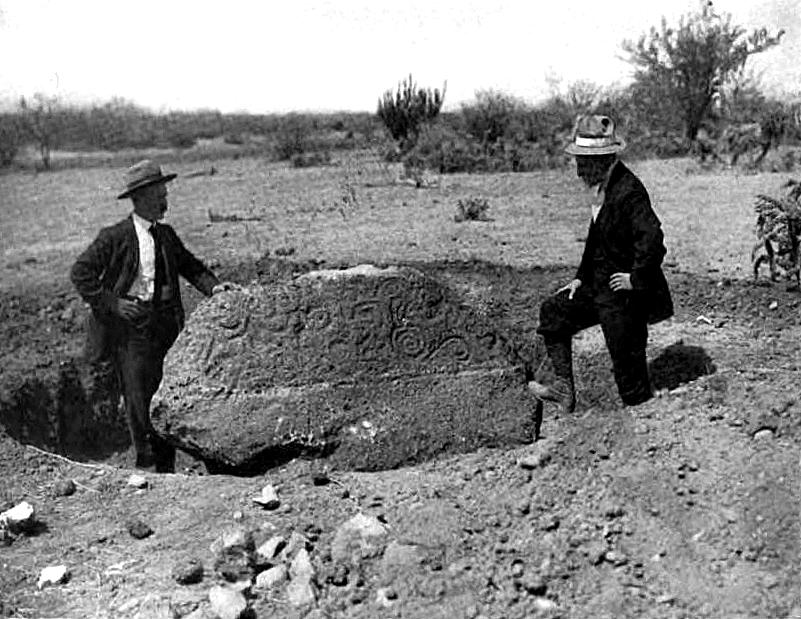
Esperanza Stone. Major F. R. Burnham (left), Holder (right), Yaqui Delta, Sonora, Mexico, 1909.

The stone was discovered during an expedition in the Yaqui valley. It was "a brown, igneous rock, its longest axis about eight feet, and on the eastern face, which had an angle of about forty-five degrees, was the deep-cut inscription." Symbols on the stone include a volute and a swastika, also found on other stones in Mexico.

There was a legend that the stone had fallen down out of heaven in times past, and that the carving was by human hands.

Burnham believed that the symbols were Mayan. Others class them as Petroglyphs.
