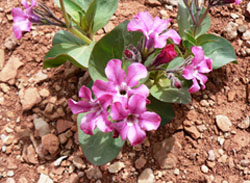

Conservation status
- Threatened (ESA)

Scientific classification
- Kingdom: Plantae
- Clade: Tracheophytes
- Clade: Angiosperms
- Clade: Eudicots
- Clade: Asterids
- Order: Gentianales
- Family: Apocynaceae
- Genus: Cycladenia
- Species: C. humilis
- Variety: C. h. var. jonesii

Trinomial name
- Cycladenia humilis var. jonesii (Eastw.) S.L. Welsh & N.D. Atwood

= Cycladenia humilis var. jonesii =

Variety of plant

Cycladenia humilis var. jonesii, known as Jones cycladenia or Jones waxy dogbane, is a threatened variety of Cycladenia humilis. It is one of three varieties of the species, the other two occurring in California (var. humilis and var. venusta).

== Habitat ==
At the time of its listing as a threatened species, Jones cycladenia occurred in four known areas in the Canyon Lands of southwestern Utah and northern Arizona. The populations were disjunct, occurring at least 100 miles (160 km) apart. It was estimated that 7,500 individual plants existed, but since many of the shoots belong to the same plant, this estimate may be too high. Jones cycladenia has exacting soil requirements, growing only on the gypsiferous, saline soils of the Cutler, Summerville, and Chinle formations. It occurs in plant communities of mixed desert scrub, juniper, or wild buckwheat and Mormon tea at elevations from 1,340 to 1,830 m (4,400 to 6,000 ft).

== Description ==
Jones cycladenia is a long-lived, perennial herb that grows four to six inches tall. Its hairless stems are covered with a white, waxy coating, and its leaves are bright-green, rounded, and somewhat succulent. Pink, woolly-haired flowers, shaped like trumpets, bloom between mid-April and early June. The fruits are brown follicles, which are dry fruits that open along one side at maturity. Although Jones cycladenia can reproduce by seed, it does not produce many fruits or seeds, and its pollinators have either disappeared, appear only episodically, or may be migratory. Therefore, Jones cycladenia primarily grows clonal shoots from its rhizomes.

== Conservation status and threats ==
The U.S. Fish and Wildlife Service has listed Jones cycladenia as a threatened species since May 5, 1986. In Utah, it is listed as imperiled, and in Arizona, it is listed as critically imperiled.

Jones cycladenia is threatened by off-road vehicles, exploration for oil, gas, and minerals, and livestock grazing. In addition, because it may be a relict from the Tertiary period, Jones cycladenia may be poorly adapted to the present climate and is threatened by future climate change. The ecosystem where the plant grows is thought to be fragile, easily degraded, and slow to recover. No critical habitat was designated for this species, because of the fear that naming the location of the plants would attract collectors.
