= Baden-Powell Peak =

Mountain in Nepal

Baden-Powell Scout Peak
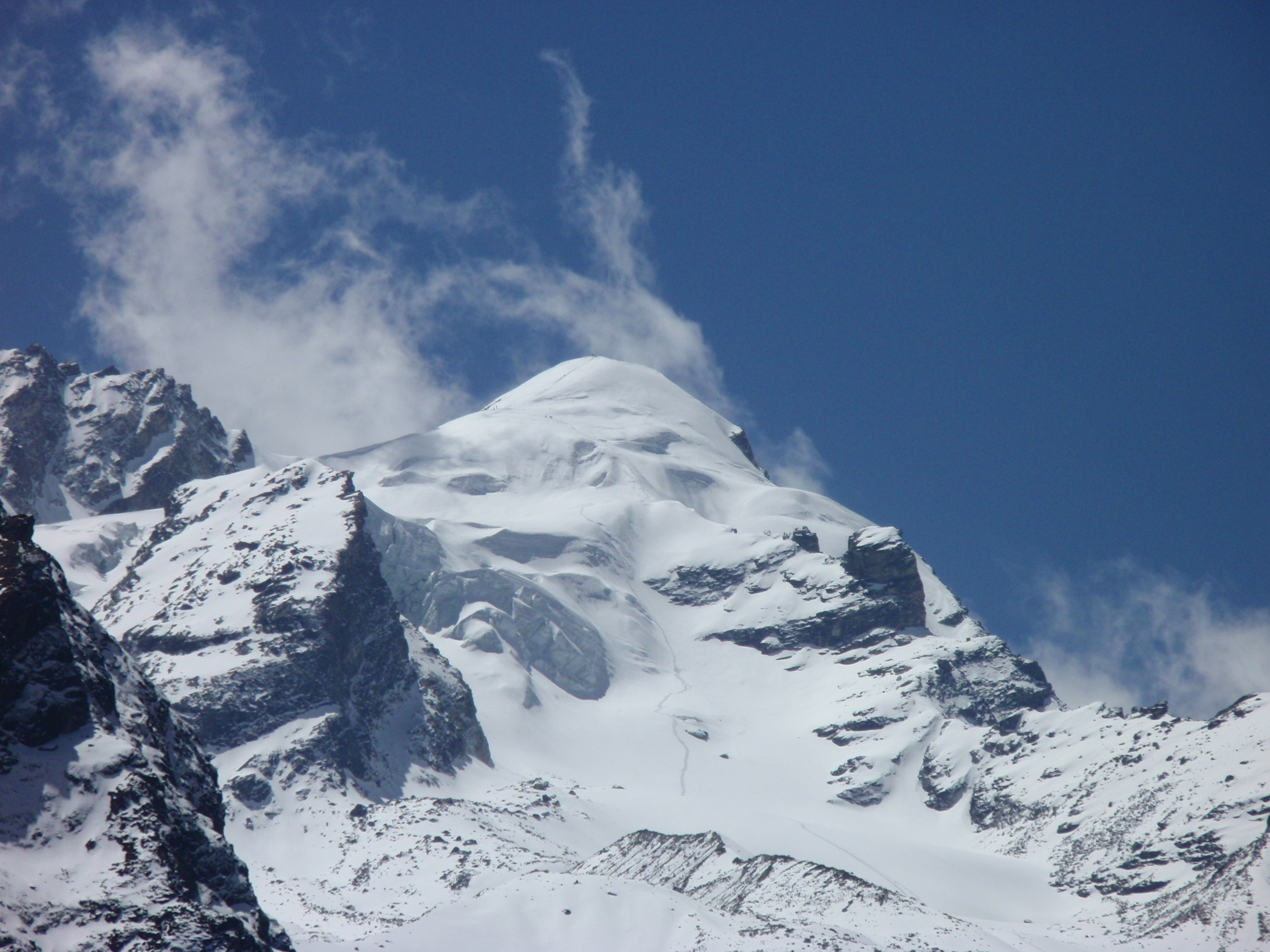

Highest point
- Elevation: 5,710 m (18,730 ft)
- Prominence: 207 m (679 ft)
- Parent peak: Naya Kanga
- Listing: List of mountains in Nepal
- Coordinates: 28°09′59″N 85°32′01″E

Geography
- Location within Nepal
- Location: Nepal
- Parent range: Himalayas

Climbing
- Easiest route: North route

Baden-Powell Scout Peak, formerly known as Urkema Peak, in Nepal is part of the Himalayas, the highest mountain range in the world. It is on the border with China about a hundred miles west of Mount Everest. As part of the Scouting 2007 Centenary, the government of Nepal renamed Urkema Peak to Baden-Powell Scout Peak, to commemorate 100 years of Scouting in honor of British soldier Robert Baden-Powell, founder of the World Scouting movement.

== First Ascent ==
The first ascent of Baden-Powell Peak was completed by an international team of Scouting members, including members from Australia, Korea, Taiwan, Singapore, Taipei, Hong Kong, Malaysia and Nepal. The first person to reach the summit was Australian climber Mark Mangles at around 12 o’clock on 12 September 2007.

15 climbers in total summited the peak during this expedition.

The climbers from the Singapore Team that summited were: Ms Sophia Ng (who was a representative of Girl Guides Singapore and WAGGGS), Mr Kenny Leong and Mr Wesley Tay.

== First UK Ascent ==
The first UK group to summit the peak was from the girl guides association, including the head girl guide. This was organised by Safe Journeys Adventure treks on 17 December 2010 and was led by Richard Struthers, who was the first British person to summit the peak.

== Ambiguity ==
The peak is sometimes mismatched with an unnamed peak (5,826m) located few km southwest, west of P. 5,857m.

== See also ==
- Mount Baden-Powell
