= Mount Baden-Powell =

Mountain in California, United States

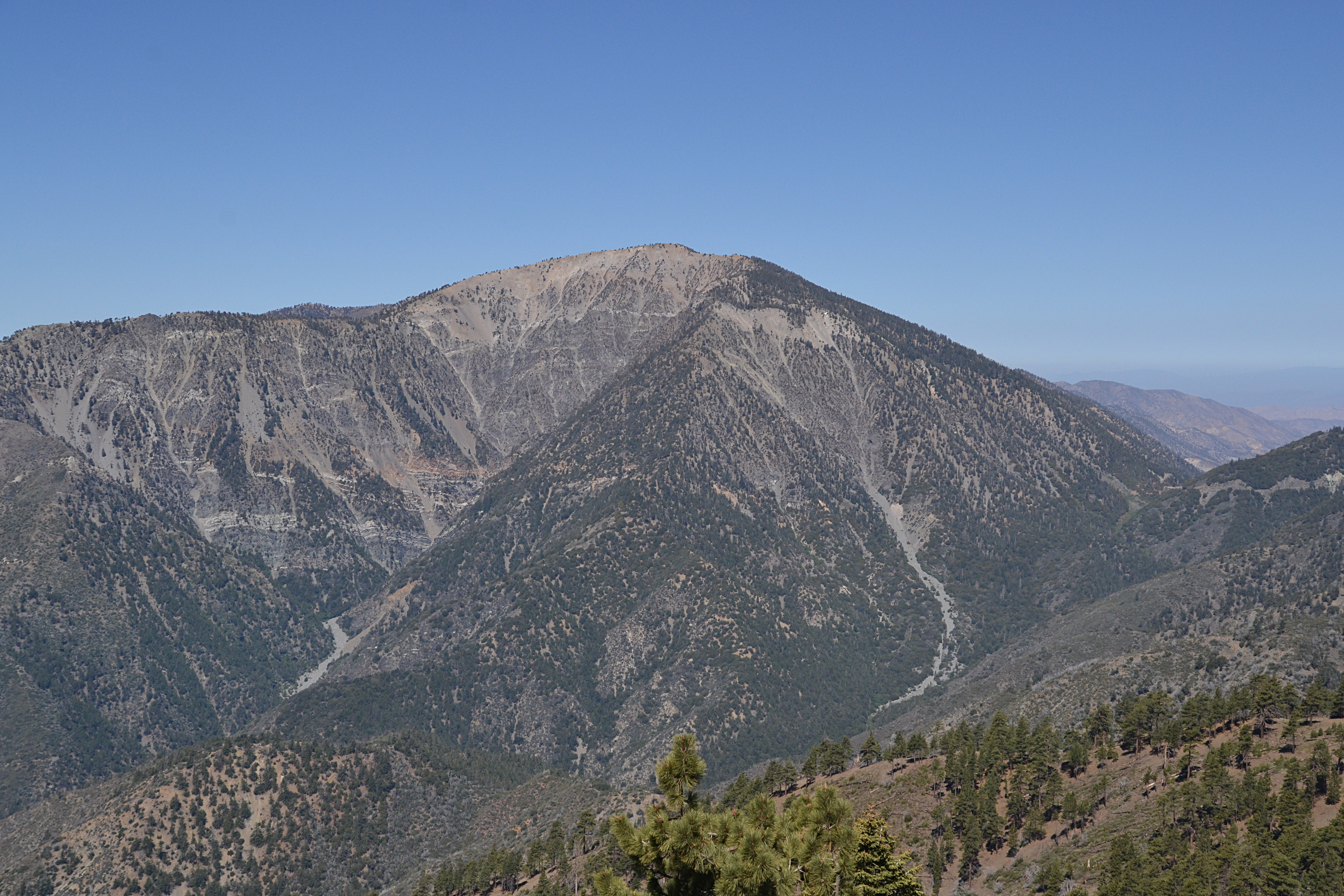
- Mount Baden-Powell as seen from Blue Ridge

Highest point
- Elevation: 9,407 ft (2,867 m) NAVD 88
- Prominence: 2,799 ft (853 m)
- Parent peak: Mount San Antonio
- Listing: Hundred Peaks Section
- Coordinates: 34°21′30″N 117°45′53″W

Geography
- Location within California Location within the United States
- Location: Los Angeles County, California, U.S.
- Parent range: San Gabriel Mountains
- Topo map: USGS Crystal Lake

Climbing
- First ascent: 1933 by Weldon Heald
- Easiest route: Hike

Mount Baden-Powell (/ˈbeɪdən ˈpoʊ.əl/) is a peak in the San Gabriel Mountains of California named for the founder of the World Scouting Movement, Robert Baden-Powell, 1st Baron Baden-Powell. It was officially recognized by the USGS at a dedication ceremony in 1931. It was originally known as East Twin or North Baldy.

== Geography ==
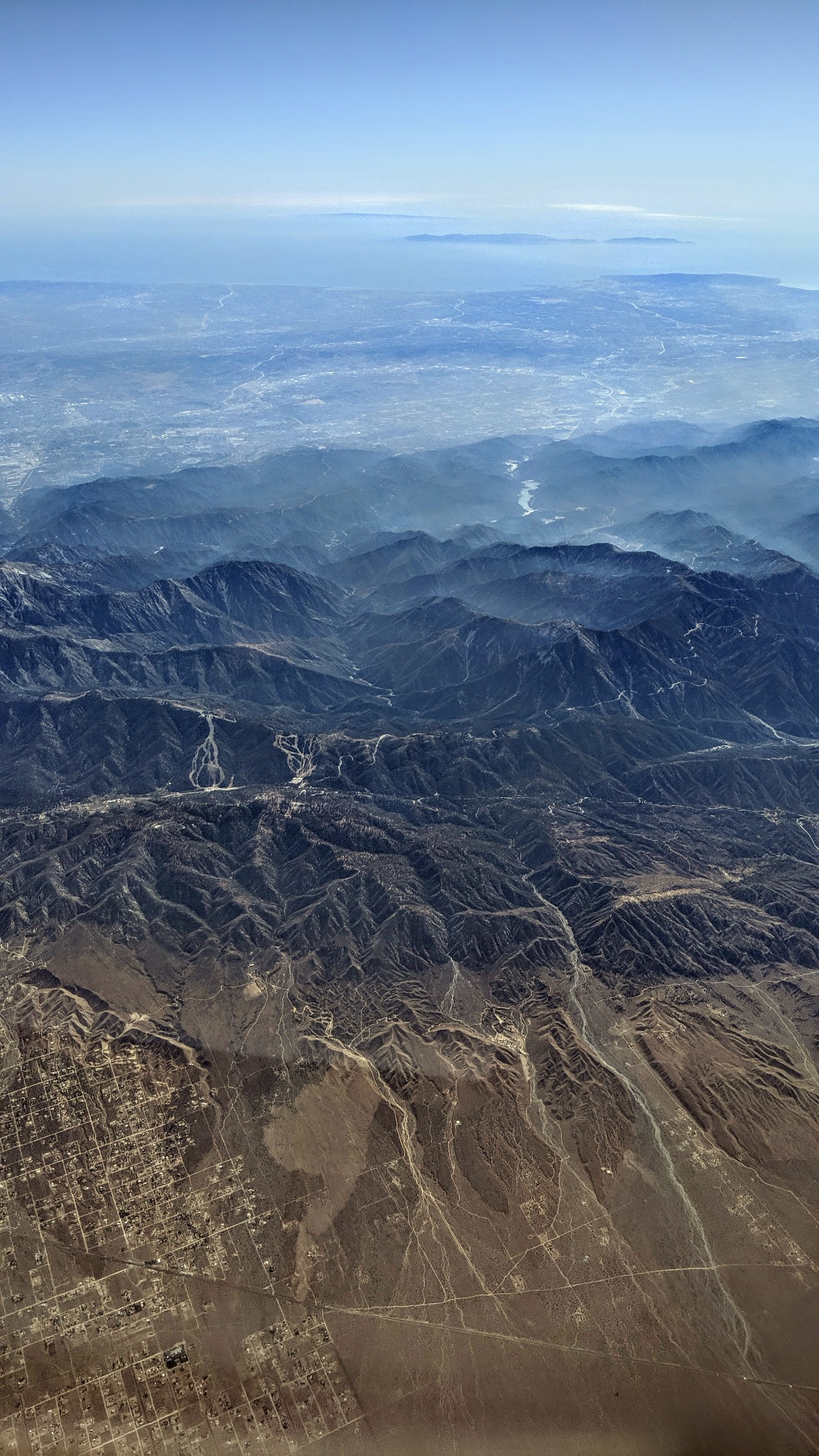
Aerial view from the north of the San Gabriel Mountains showing Piñon Hills, Mescal Creek Road, Mount Baden-Powell, and Mountain High Resort. Los Angeles Basin and Santa Catalina Island in background.

At 9,407 feet (2,867 m) in elevation, Mount Baden-Powell is traditionally considered to be the 5th highest peak of the San Gabriel Range; however it is the second highest peak in the range with more than 1,000 feet (300 m) of prominence, and is the highest peak not part of the Mount San Antonio massif.

The peak is within the Angeles National Forest and San Gabriel Mountains National Monument.

== Hiking ==
The Pacific Crest Trail reaches within 0.25 miles (0.40 km) of the summit; at 9,360 feet (2,850 m), this is the highest point of the trail south of the Sierra Nevada.

The summit has long been a favorite hiking excursion either from the Mount Islip Saddle near Little Jimmy Trail Camp, or the Vincent Gap Trail which leads up a moderate to strenuous set of switchbacks from Wrightwood. Mount Baden-Powell is also the high point along The Silver Moccasin Trail, a historic 53-mile (85 km) Boy Scout hiking trail, which connects this summit to Mount Burnham (less than 1 mile (1.6 km) away), Throop Peak, and Mount Hawkins. The Vincent Gap hike leads through a variety of forested areas consisting of Jeffrey Pine, Ponderosa Pine, Lodgepole Pine, Incense-cedar, and an ancient forest of Limber Pine some of which are more than 2,000 years old.

In 1957 several Southern California councils of the Boy Scouts of America placed a formal marker at the summit with a plaque dedicated to Lord Baden-Powell.

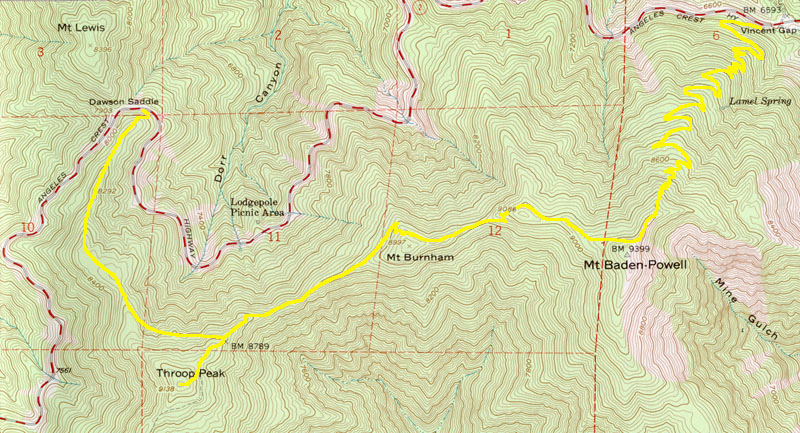
Trail connecting Mt. Burnham to Mt. Baden-Powell

== See also ==
- Baden-Powell Peak in Nepal
