= Silver Knapsack Trail =

- Length: 36.2 mi (58.3 km)
- Location: Tulare County, California, USA
- Trailheads: Summit and Clicks Creek Trailheads above Springville, California; 36.180375°N 118.535071°W
- Use: Hiking, Backpacking
- Highest point: Florence Peak, 12,438 ft (3,791 m)
- Difficulty: Moderate to strenuous

The Silver Knapsack Trail is a 36.2-mile (58.3 km) (Note: Distances from 35 to 45 miles are listed and they can be accounted for by various trail options and slight measuring differences.) trail in the Sierra Nevada, near Johnsondale, Springville, and Three Rivers, California. It is located in Sequoia National Forest and the southernmost part of Sequoia National Park. Much of the trail lies within the Golden Trout Wilderness.

== Background ==
There are seven glacier-carved lakes along the trail, and most of the trail is above 7,000 feet (2,100 m). The Summit Trailhead elevation is 8,250 feet (2,510 m). The elevation of the trail ranges from 6,050 to 9,850 feet (1,840 to 3,000 m). The trail is open from July to October and is very popular with Boy Scouts. There are several intersecting and side trails that provide many options varying the exact length and path of a hike, backpacking, or camping excursion.

Starting from Summit Trailhead headed north, the landmarks on the trail are: South Mountaineer Creek, Jacobsen Meadow, Mowery Meadow, Alpine Meadow (which isn't actually alpine in nature), Griswold Meadow, Maggie Mountain, Maggie Lakes, Frog Lakes, Twin Lakes, Sheep Mountain, Quinn Patrol Cabin, Soda Spring Creek and Soda Spring (which has carbonated water), Newlywed Site, Walker Cabin (built in 1886), Mountaineer Creek, Grey Meadow Ranger Station, Clicks Creek, Clicks Creek Trailhead, and then back to Summit Trailhead. Several of the cabins in the area were originally built by sheepherders; for example Quinn Patrol Cabin was built by sheepherder Harry Quinn circa 1900.

== Segments ==
The trail is a circle (loop) hike, generally starting from either the Summit or Clicks Creek Trailheads, both of which are in the southwestern portion of the trail. It is composed of the following segments:

- Summit Trailhead to Alpine Meadow ... 6.5 miles (10.5 km)
- Alpine Meadow to Maggie Lakes ... 6.4 miles (10.3 km)
- Maggie Lakes to Soda Spring Creek ... 9.5 miles (15.3 km)
- Soda Spring Creek to Little Kern River ... 7.5 miles (12.1 km)
- Little Kern River to Clicks Creek Trailhead ... 7.5 miles (12.1 km)

== Silver Knapsack Award ==
Silver Knapsack Award

Scouts and Leaders who meet the 9 requirements, can earn the Silver Knapsack Award patch.

== See also ==
- Silver Moccasin Trail
