= Horse Flats =

Los Angeles–based mountain range

Coordinates: 34°20′33″N 118°00′36″W

Horse Flats is a region of the San Gabriel Mountains in the Angeles National Forest north of Los Angeles. It is known for its US Forest Service campground (open April 1-November 15) and for the excellent granite bouldering near the campground. It is off California State Route 2. The elevation is 5,800 ft (1,800 m). Closed in the winter months. In the campground is Mount Hillyer Trail, which connects to the Silver Moccasin Trail.

== History ==
In the nineteenth century, the area was used by Tiburcio Vásquez and his gang as a hideout and corral for their stolen livestock
