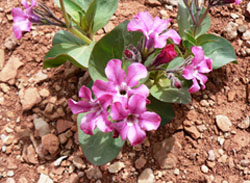
- Cycladenia humilis var. jonesii

Conservation status
- Vulnerable (NatureServe)

Scientific classification
- Kingdom: Plantae
- Clade: Tracheophytes
- Clade: Angiosperms
- Clade: Eudicots
- Clade: Asterids
- Order: Gentianales
- Family: Apocynaceae
- Subfamily: Apocynoideae
- Tribe: Odontadenieae
- Genus: Cycladenia; Benth.
- Species: C. humilis

Binomial name
- Cycladenia humilis Benth.

= Cycladenia =

Genus of plants

Cycladenia humilis is the sole member of the monotypic genus Cycladenia. Known by the common name Sacramento waxydogbane, it is an uncommon plant native to the southwestern United States. Collections have mostly been from California, although the species has also been reported from Utah and Arizona, mostly on gypsum soils. It is found at some elevation in several mountain ranges in the region. One of the four varieties of this plant, called the Jones cycladenia, is considered a threatened taxon. This is a fleshy perennial herb with dull green leaves and pinkish lavender flowers. The flowers begin as rolled tubes shaped like pea pods and then open into colorful funnel-shaped blooms.

== Nomenclature ==
Cycladenia humilis Benth., Pl. Hartw. 323. 1849.

Three varieties are recognized in addition to the autonymic var. humilis:

- Cycladenia humilis var. jonesii (Eastw.) S.L. Welsh & N.D. Atwood, Great Basin Naturalist 35(4): 333. 1976. = Cycladenia jonesii Eastw., Leafl. W. Bot. 3(7): 159–160. 1942.
- Cycladenia humilis var. tomentosa (A. Gray) A. Gray, Syn. Fl. N. Amer. 2(1): 400. 1886. = Cycladenia tomentosa A. Gray, Bot. California 1: 474. 1876.
- Cycladenia humilis var. venusta (Eastw.) Woodson ex Munz, Man. S. Calif. Bot. 379. 1935. = Cycladenia venusta Eastw., Bull. Torrey Bot. Club 29(2): 77. 1902.
