= Throop Peak =

Mountain in California, United States

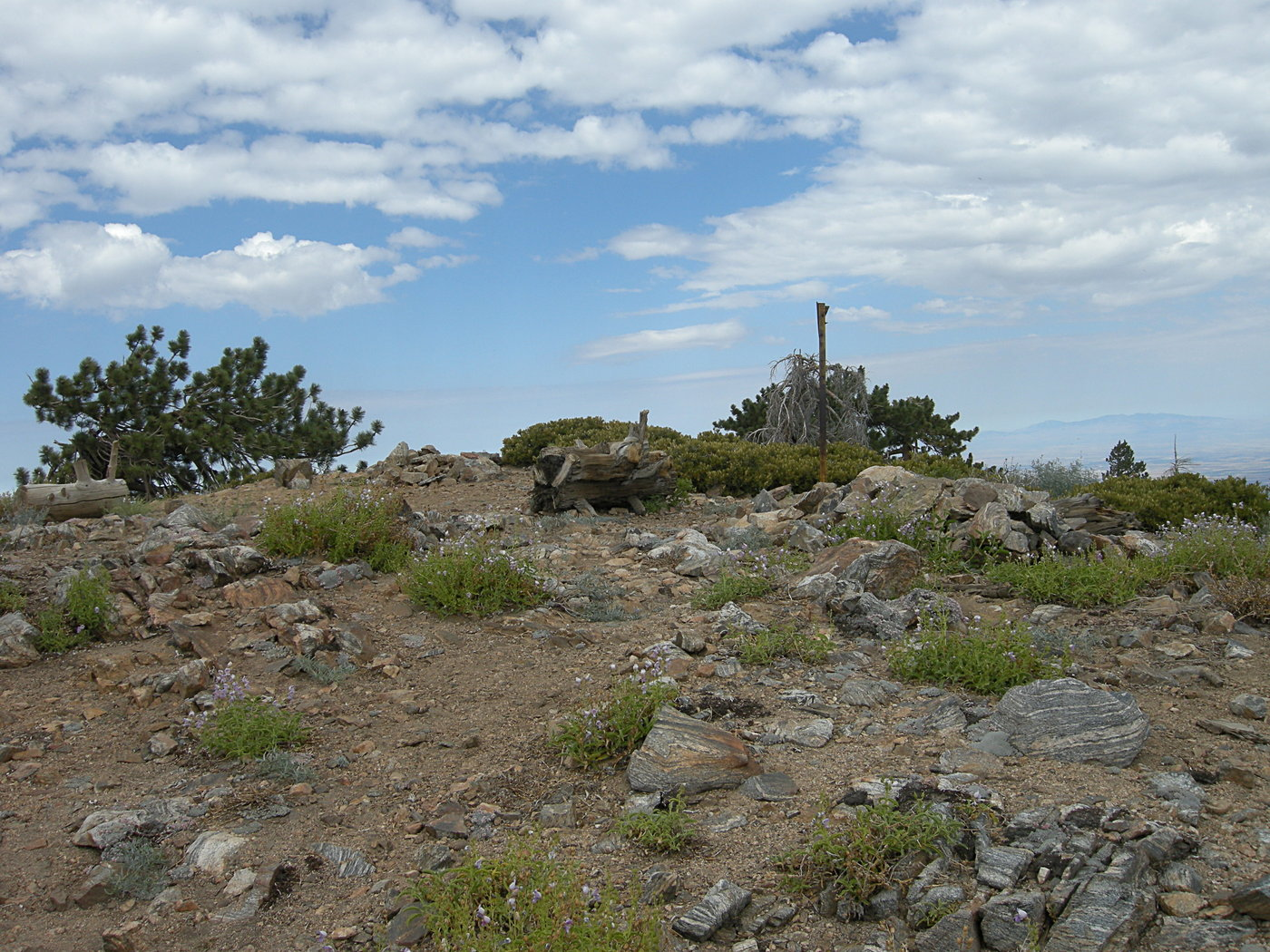

Highest point
- Elevation: 9,142 ft (2,786 m) NAVD 88
- Prominence: 618 ft (188 m)
- Listing: Hundred Peaks Section
- Coordinates: 34°21′02″N 117°47′58″W

Geography
- Location within California Location within the United States
- Location: Los Angeles County, California, United States
- Parent range: San Gabriel Mountains
- Topo map: USGS Crystal Lake

Climbing
- Easiest route: Trail hike, class 1

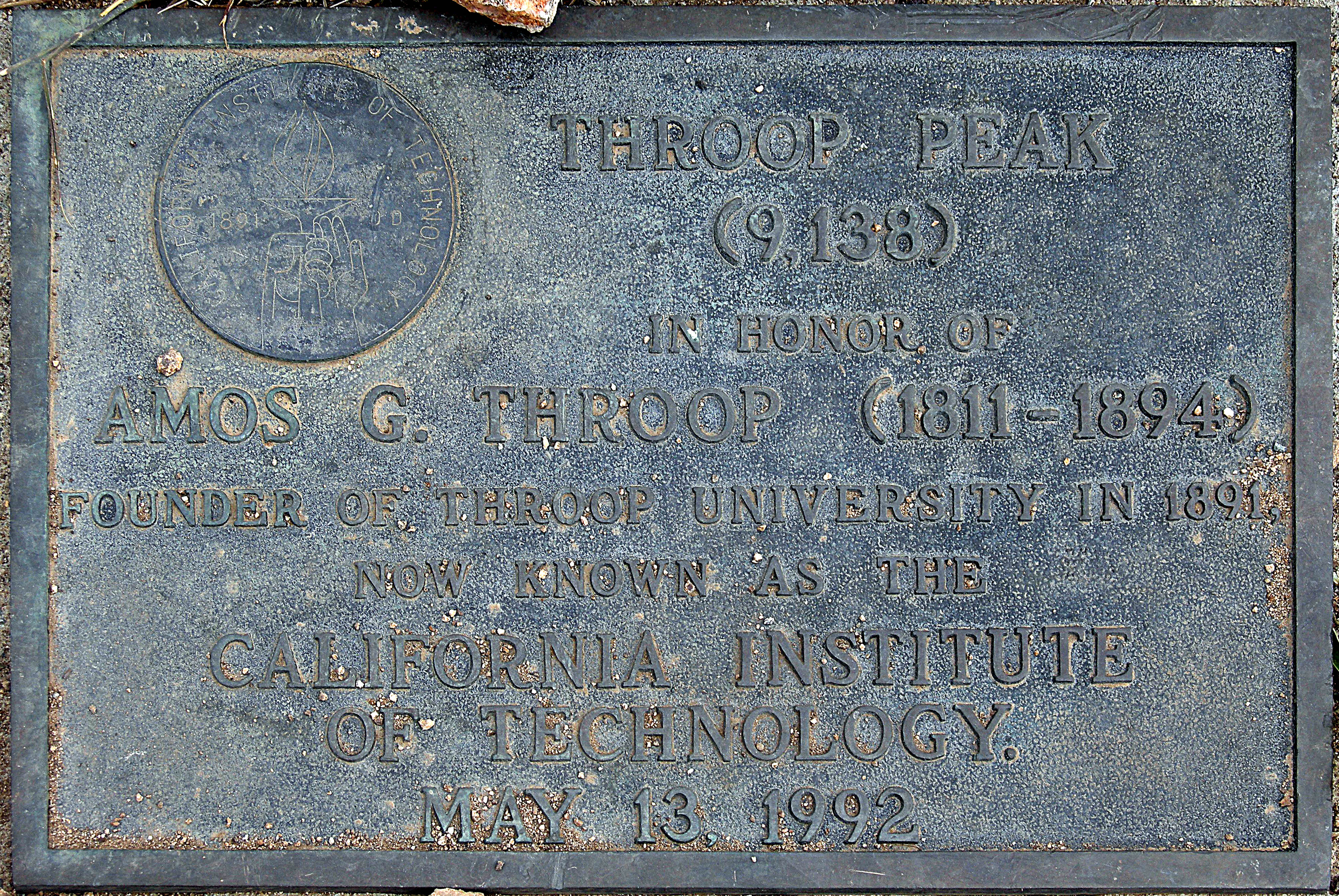
Plaque on Throop Peak

Throop Peak (/ˈtruːp/ TROOP) is a 9,142 feet (2,786 m) peak of the San Gabriel Mountains, in the San Gabriel Mountains National Monument and Angeles National Forest, in Los Angeles County, California.

The high peak provides views of both the Mojave Desert and the Los Angeles Basin all the way to the ocean. The peak was named for Amos G. Throop, founder of Caltech, formerly called Throop College. The peak marks the northwestern boundary of the Sheep Mountain Wilderness.

== Access ==
A trailhead for climbing Throop Peak is located at Dawson Saddle along the Angeles Crest Highway. The route goes through a forest of Jeffrey Pine, Sugar Pine, and the high elevation Lodgepole Pine with some White Fir.

== Climbing Season ==
The most popular seasons for climbing Throop Peak are spring and fall because of the cooler temperatures and easy accessibility.
