= South Mount Hawkins =

Mountain in Angeles National Forest, California

- Location within California Location within the United States

Highest point
- Elevation: 7,786 ft (2,373 m) NAVD 88
- Listing: Hundred Peaks Section
- Coordinates: 34°18′41″N 117°48′37″W

Geography
- Location: Los Angeles County, California, U.S.
- Parent range: San Gabriel Mountains
- Topo map: USGS Crystal Lake

South Mount Hawkins is located in the San Gabriel Mountains, and contained within the Angeles National Forest. The mountain was named after Nellie Hawkins, a popular waitress of the Squirrel Inn located on the North Fork of the San Gabriel River. Although the Squirrel Inn is long gone, Nellie has her name on Mount Hawkins and South Mount Hawkins. There are two ridge bumps between the two named summits and they are unofficially known as "Middle Hawkins" and "Sadie Hawkins". According to the California State Library, "Cold Brook Camp, located within the Angeles National Forest, [was] very popular with campers. Started out as hunter's camp owned by R.W. Dawson. In 1901, land leased to Doc Beatty who opened hostelry called Squirrel Inn. In 1907, Dawson took over the Inn renaming it Cold Brook Camp. Eventually built hotel, cabins and tents. Was popular in early 1900s and into the 1920s."

== South Mount Hawkins fire lookout tower ==
For 67 years the South Mount Hawkins Lookout, tower stood on the summit of South Mount Hawkins It was built in 1935. It was one of the only all-wooden towers in Southern California. The tower was destroyed in the Curve Fire on September 1, 2002.

== Road to tower platform ==
The Forest Service has abandoned the 7-mile (11 km) long dirt road which goes from the Deer Flats Group Campground located within the Crystal Lake Recreation Area all the way to the concrete platform upon which the fire watch tower used to stand.

The road is only maintained on an as needed basis such as a fire or access to the forest service repeater. Hikers and bicycle riders still find the road passable to the top of South Mount Hawkins however there are washouts along the way and it is strewn with rocks and boulders, making the Deer Flat route up to the mountain difficult. The other access route for hikers but not bicycle riders to reach South Mount Hawkins is the Pacific Crest Trail segment which leads from Windy Gap Trail then down the Hawkins Ridge Trail to the peak.

== See also ==
- Falling Springs, California – Archaic placename, Angeles National Forest
