= Falling Springs, California =

Archaic placename, Angeles National Forest

Falling Springs
- Ghost town
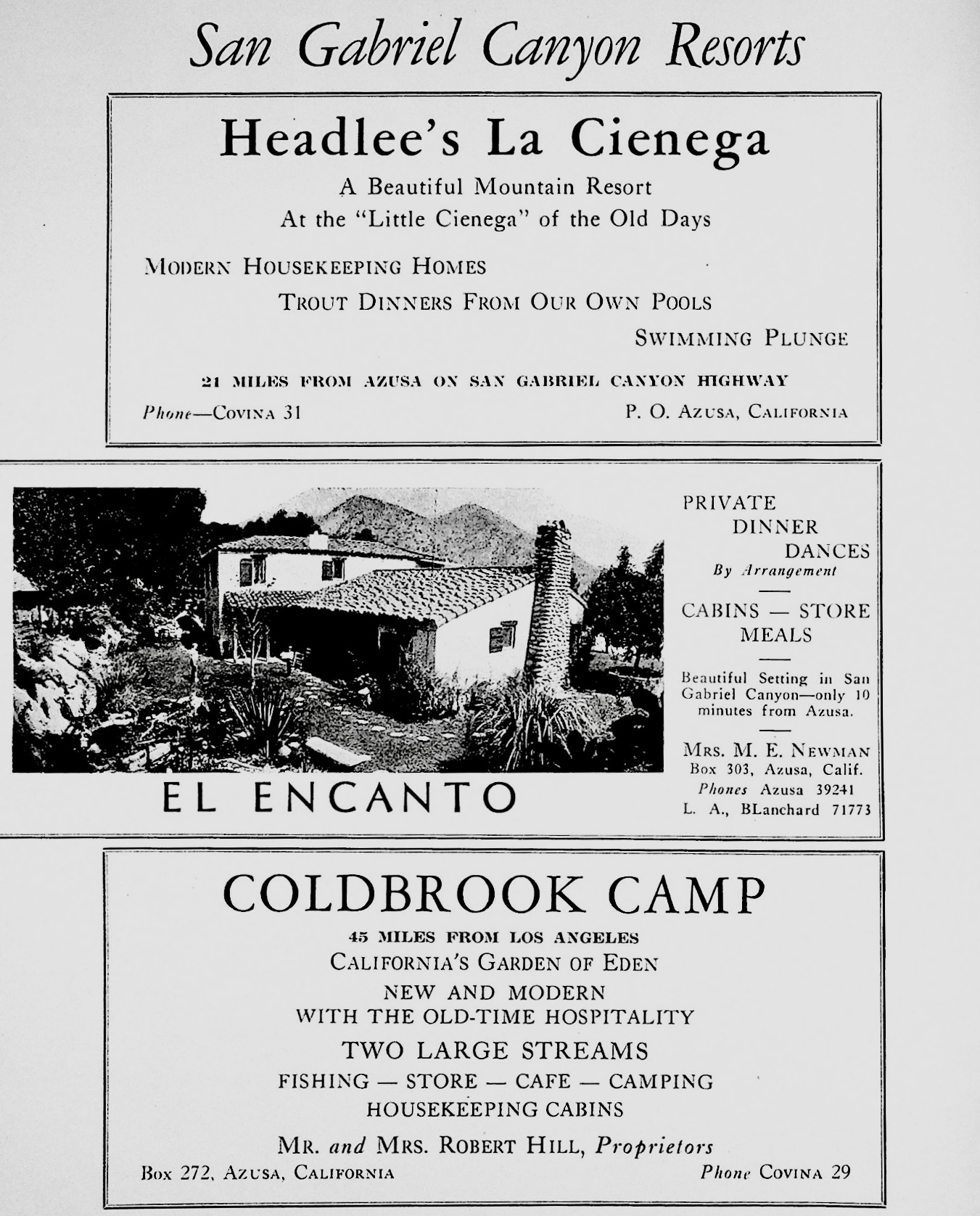
- Falling Springs and Cold Brook c. 1936

- Location in California
- Coordinates: 34°18′06″N 117°50′21″W
- Country: United States
- State: California
- County: Los Angeles County
- Elevation: 3,957 ft (1,206 m)

Falling Springs is an archaic placename in Los Angeles County, California. Little Cienega was the site of rustic resorts located along the north fork of the San Gabriel River in the San Gabriel Mountains along Soldier Creek, 12 miles (19 km) north-northeast of Azusa, in close proximity to Crystal Lake Recreation Area in the Angeles National Forest.

== History ==
The site was originally known as La Cienega, after a nearby spring, before it became known as Falling Springs on August 30, 1981. In 1998 it was again renamed to Little Cienega. One 1910 news feature translated cienega as "wet morass." According to the Los Angeles Times in 1934, "Past the entrance to Coldbrook Camp, the road leaves the canyon and climbs the steep face of the ridge, dips into Soldier Creek, dark with the shade of great pines and oaks that shelter scores of mountain cabins, and climbs again past Headlee's Camp, a lovely little mountain resort in what used to be La Cienega. A little stream rises in the clenega, and runs past the doors of the cabins."

The main resort at the settlement was called Headlee's La Cienega (or similar) prior to 1959, after which it changed names to Falling Springs. The Headlee's resort was established by Frank McCord. Scenes from the Paramount comedy Six of a Kind were filmed at Headlee's in 1933. The main lodge hosted a branch of the LA County Library in 1935. Headlee's Mountain Club garnered a mention in the 1941 FWP American Guide to Los Angeles; the editors included it as a possible stop on their Tour 1B to Crystal Lake, "Right on this graded dirt road to HEADLEE's MOUNTAIN CLUB (rates reasonable), 0.1 m. (7,000 alt.), a resort with a rustic wood-stone main lodge that crowns a projection overlooking the main highway and the steep drop into the North Fork Canyon. The resort has wading and swimming pools, a nine-hole putting green, and croquet and horseshoe pitching courts."

The swimming pool at the resort was deemed an attraction to vacationers in 1949. Circa 1957, Falling Springs and nearby Cold Brook were described as "tiny communities" in the vicinity of Crystal Lake in the Angeles National Forest. There was still a lodge with cabins and a restaurant at Falling Springs in 1961; according to one newspaper travel writer, "The lodge is a welcome spot for families with children as well as for clubs and groups. Rustic cabins sheltered by huge old incense cedars and white alders add rest and comfort for all visitors to enjoy. A running brook meanders in front of the cabins and spills over the side of the hill near the restaurant in the form of a tumbling waterfall."

All that remains of the community is some abandoned vacation cabins, many of which have burned down. The cabins had most recently been occupied by a religious group. Before the Curve Fire burned through the area several years ago, the cabins had been heavily vandalized. Because of abundant water from springs and the creek, the cabin area is now heavily overgrown including abundant poison oak, blocked by numerous burned, fallen trees, and virtually impassable.

== See also ==
- South Mount Hawkins – Mountain in Angeles National Forest, California
