= Soldier Creek =

Soldier Creek may refer to:

- Soldier Creek (California), a stream in Los Angeles County, California, US
- Soldier Creek (Kansas River), a river in Kansas
- Soldier Creek (Niobrara River tributary), a stream in Knox County, Nebraska
- Soldier Creek, a stream in Carbon County, Utah that flows into the Price River
- Soldier Creek, a stream in Tooele County, Utah that flows into Rush Lake
- Soldier Creek (Utah County, Utah), a stream that flows into the Spanish Fork (river)
- Soldier Creek Dam, a dam on the Strawberry River in Wasatch County, Utah
- Soldier Creek Wilderness, a wilderness area in Nebraska
