= Dawson Saddle =

Mountain pass in the San Gabriel Mountains of California, United States

- Location within the Los Angeles metropolitan area Location within California
- Elevation: 7,943 ft (2,421 m)
- Traversed by: SR 2

Third Approach
- Location: Los Angeles County, California
- Range: San Gabriel Mountains
- Coordinates: 34°22′04″N 117°48′12″W

Dawson Saddle is a saddle and mountain pass over the San Gabriel Mountains located in northeastern Los Angeles County, California, United States. At 7,943 ft (2,421 m), it is the highest point along the Angeles Crest Highway and the second highest mountain pass in Southern California after Onyx Summit.

== Geography ==
Dawson Saddle lies between Mount Lewis to the north and Throop Peak to the southeast.

The saddle is accessible via State Route 2 (Angeles Crest Highway) or by foot along Dawson Saddle Trail, a branch of the Pacific Crest Trail. Vehicle access during the winter months is restricted due to heavy snowfall.

== See also ==
- Islip Saddle
