= Soldier Creek (Los Angeles County, California) =

Stream in the Angeles National Forest, California, USA

Coordinates: 34°17′27″N 117°50′26″W

Soldier Creek is a stream in the San Gabriel Mountains in the US state of California, near Crystal Lake.

== Description ==
Multiple trails intersect with or run parallel to Soldier Creek. The Soldier Creek Trail starts in the Crystal Lake Recreation Area and ends at Crystal Lake Road after crossing Soldier Creek. Soldier Creek also features a small waterfall, known as Lewis Falls. The Lewis Falls Trail ends at Lewis Falls and runs next to a segment of Soldier Creek. The stream passes through Little Cienega.
