= Windy Gap Trail (Angeles National Forest) =

Trail in Los Angeles County, California

Coordinates: 34.3433340°N 117.8286726°W

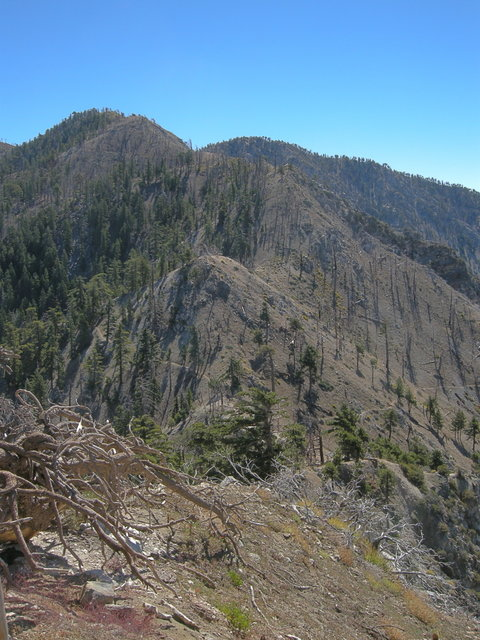
- Windy Gap Trail from Mt. Islip Trail
- Length: 2 mi (3.2 km)
- Location: Angeles National Forest, Los Angeles County, California, USA
- Trailheads: Crystal Lake Campground above Azusa, California; Windy Gap near Mount Islip (Angeles National Forest).
- Use: Hiking, Backpacking, Biking
- Highest point: Windy Gap, 7,588 ft (2,313 m)
- Difficulty: Moderately strenuous

The Windy Gap Trail is a short but important link of the north San Gabriel River valley to the Pacific Crest Trail in the San Gabriel Mountains in California. The trailhead starts at the uppermost parking lot of the Crystal Lake Recreation Area, which is about 3 miles (4.8 km) up from State Route 39, 25 miles (40 km) above Azusa, California. The trail is rated moderately strenuous.

In September 2002, parts of the trail were burned in the Curve Fire, which burned 20,857 acres (84.41 km^{2}) and included parts of the Crystal Lake Recreation Area. Nearly the entire length of the trail is exposed to direct sunlight due to the fire. However, new growth has been observed during the trail restoration effort in the aftermath of the Curve Fire.

The trail heads due north up the steep canyon face above the campground and crosses the South Hawkins fire lookout access road twice. The second crossing is near the Big Cienega Spring after which it heads on a right oblique toward the ridge and the saddle, which is named Windy Gap. From this vantage point one faces into a seemingly perpetual wind that blows up from the broad canyon below. The benchmark here is posted at 7,588 feet (2,313 m).

The total hike is about 2 miles (3.2 km) and intersects the trails for Little Jimmy Trail Camp, Mount Islip, or other mountains east, South Hawkins, Baden-Powell, and the Vincent Gap Trail.
