= Mount Islip =

Mountain in California, U.S.

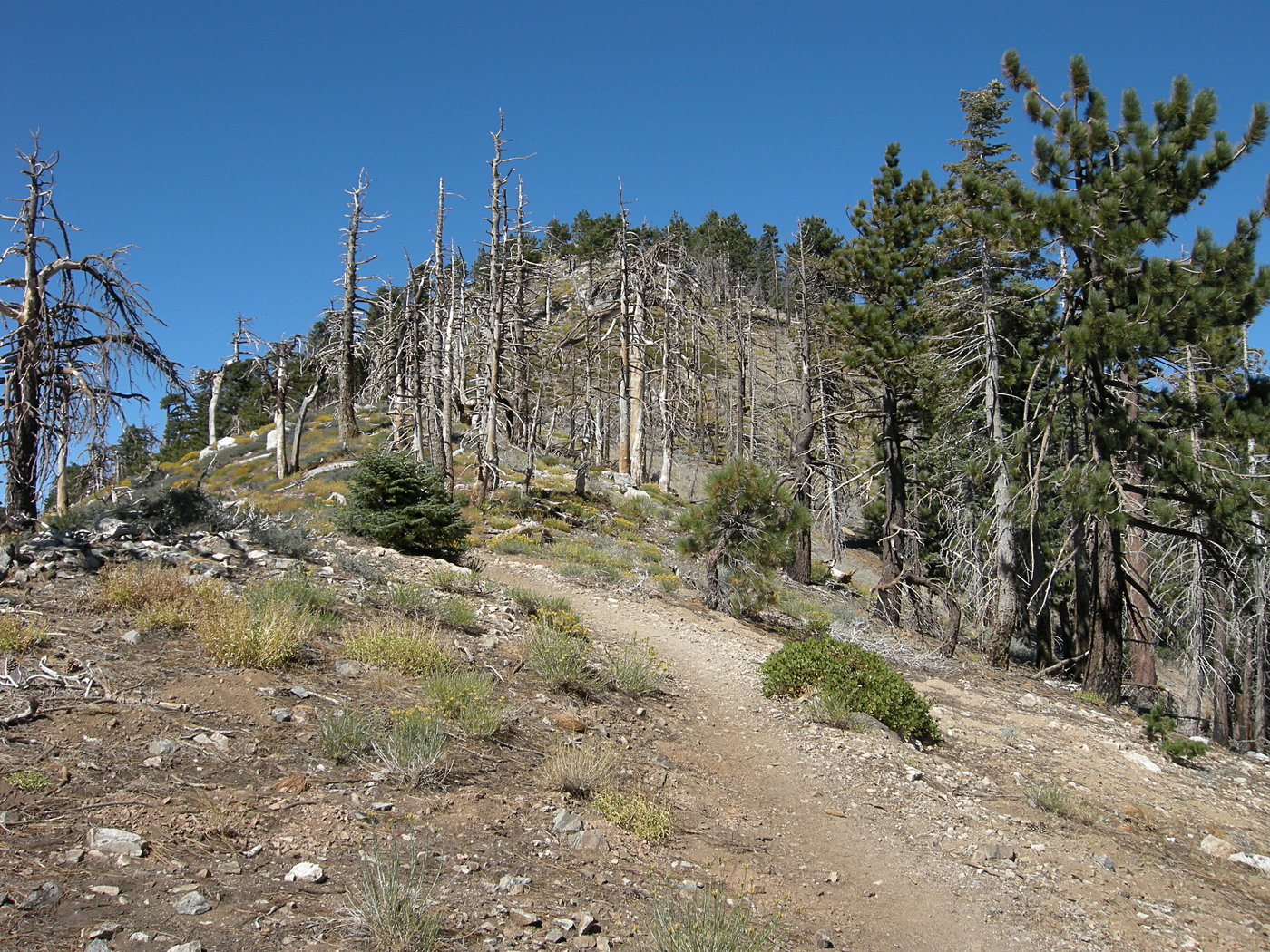
- Mount Islip from the trail to the top

Highest point
- Elevation: 8,250 ft (2,515 m) NAVD 88
- Prominence: 662 ft (202 m)
- Listing: Hundred Peaks Section
- Coordinates: 34°20′42″N 117°50′24″W

Geography
- Location within California Location within the United States
- Location: Los Angeles County, California, U.S.
- Parent range: San Gabriel Mountains
- Topo map: USGS Crystal Lake

Climbing
- Easiest route: Trail hike, class 1

Mount Islip (/ˈaɪslɪp/ EYE-slip) is a 8,250-foot (2,515 m) peak in the Angeles National Forest in California, United States. On a clear day the sharp, high peak provides impressive views of the Mojave Desert, the Los Angeles Basin, Santa Catalina Island, and San Clemente Island.

The peak is named for George Islip, a homesteader who lived in the surrounding area during the late 19th century. It was once home to a steel fire lookout tower that was built in 1927. A remnant of the lookout site, a rock cabin, remains near the summit to this day.

A trailhead for climbing Mount Islip is located at Islip Saddle, along the Angeles Crest Highway, approximately 53 miles (85 km) northeast of downtown Los Angeles. Another trailhead is at the Crystal Lake Recreation Area, north of Azusa.

== Gallery ==
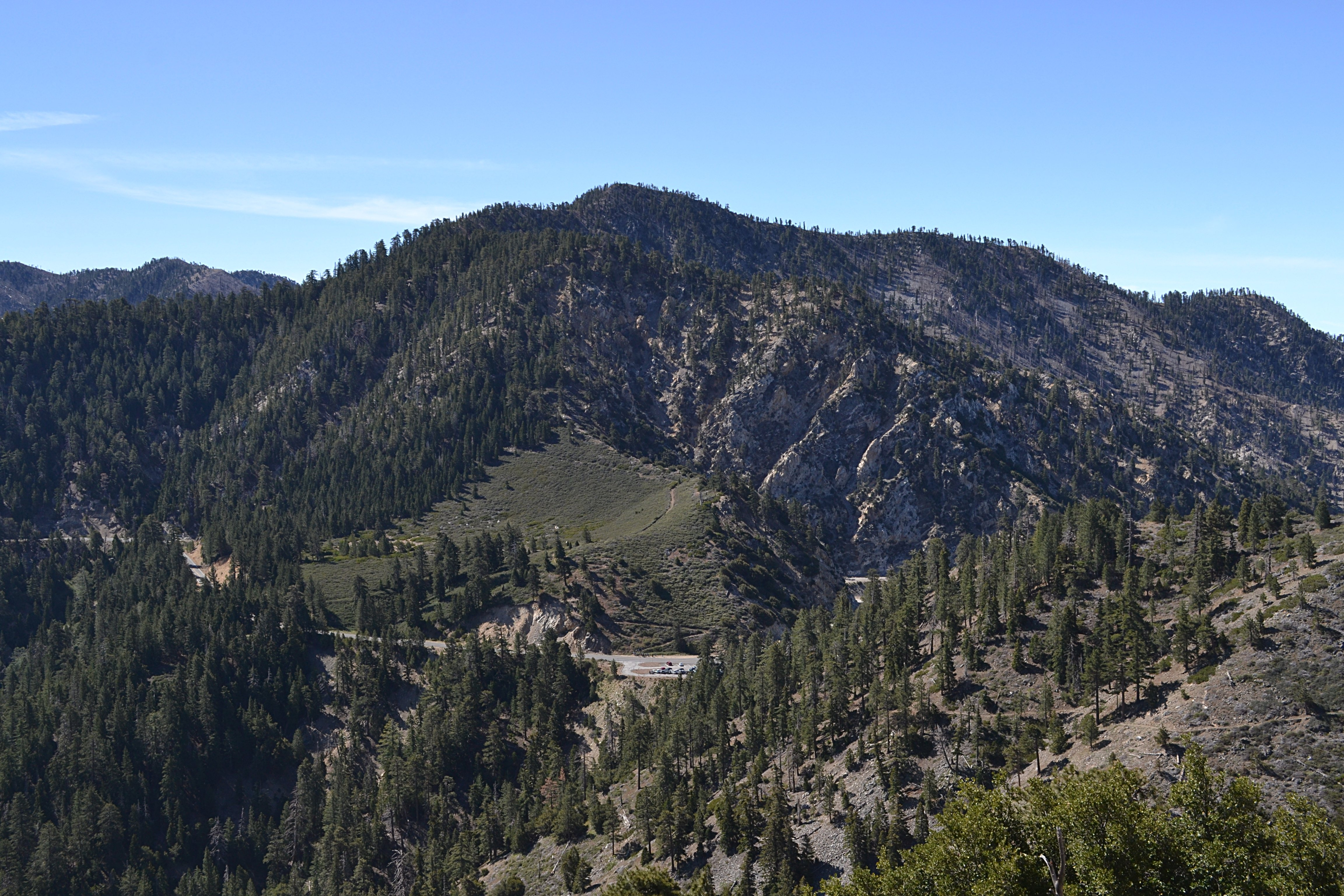
Mount Islip from the Pacific Crest Trail

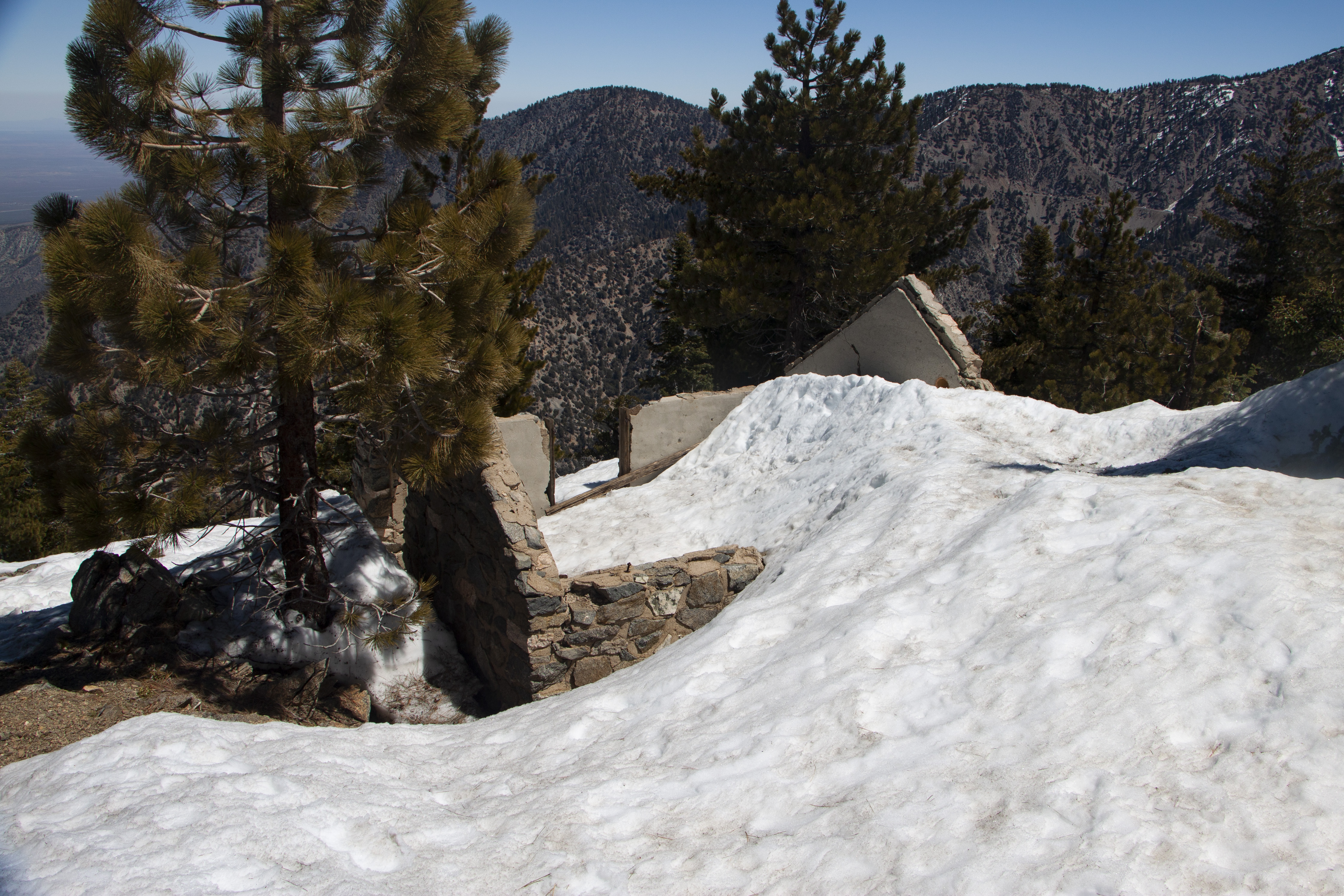
Remnants of the rock cabin in 2019
