= Newcomb's Ranch =

Roadhouse in the Angeles National Forest, California, USA

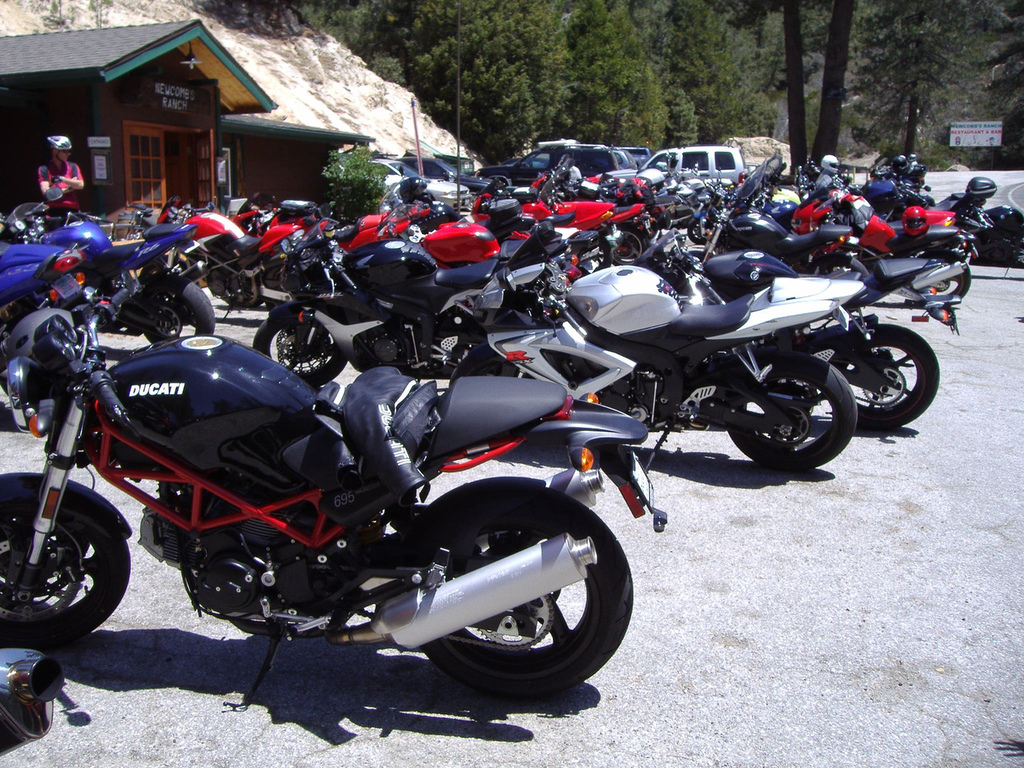
- Interactive map of Newcomb's Ranch

Restaurant information
- Location: Angeles Crest Highway, La Cañada Flintridge, California, 91011
- Coordinates: 34.32983°N 118.00195°W
- Website: http://www.newcombsranch.com/

Newcomb's Ranch is a roadhouse at 5,340 feet (1,630 m) in elevation in the Angeles National Forest, near Los Angeles, California. It is the only private property along the Angeles Crest Highway and is very popular with motorcyclists and is called "the informal headquarters for riders" by the Los Angeles Magazine and "one of Southern California's most famous Rickey Racer Roadhouses" by Motorcyclist. The roadhouse is located in unincorporated Los Angeles County, near La Cañada Flintridge.

The Newcomb family, who also created the Mount Waterman ski area, settled the property using the Land Revision Act of 1891, building the roadhouse in 1939. The roadhouse has served as a restaurant, hotel, general store, gas station, and as a brothel or love hotel. The inn burned in 1976, allegedly started by a cook who had been terminated. The fire destroyed most of the second floor, which was not rebuilt. It was purchased in late 2001 by Frederick Rundall, an oncologist who purchased the roadhouse from Lynn Newcomb and remodeled it in 2003 for $340,000. The second floor became lodging for employees.

Motorcyclist and comedian Jay Leno is a "frequent visitor" to Newcomb's.

The ranch was closed in March 2020 and put up for sale in June 2021. As of August 2025, the ranch was still closed and up for sale.
