= Islip Saddle =

Mountain pass in Los Angeles County, California, United States

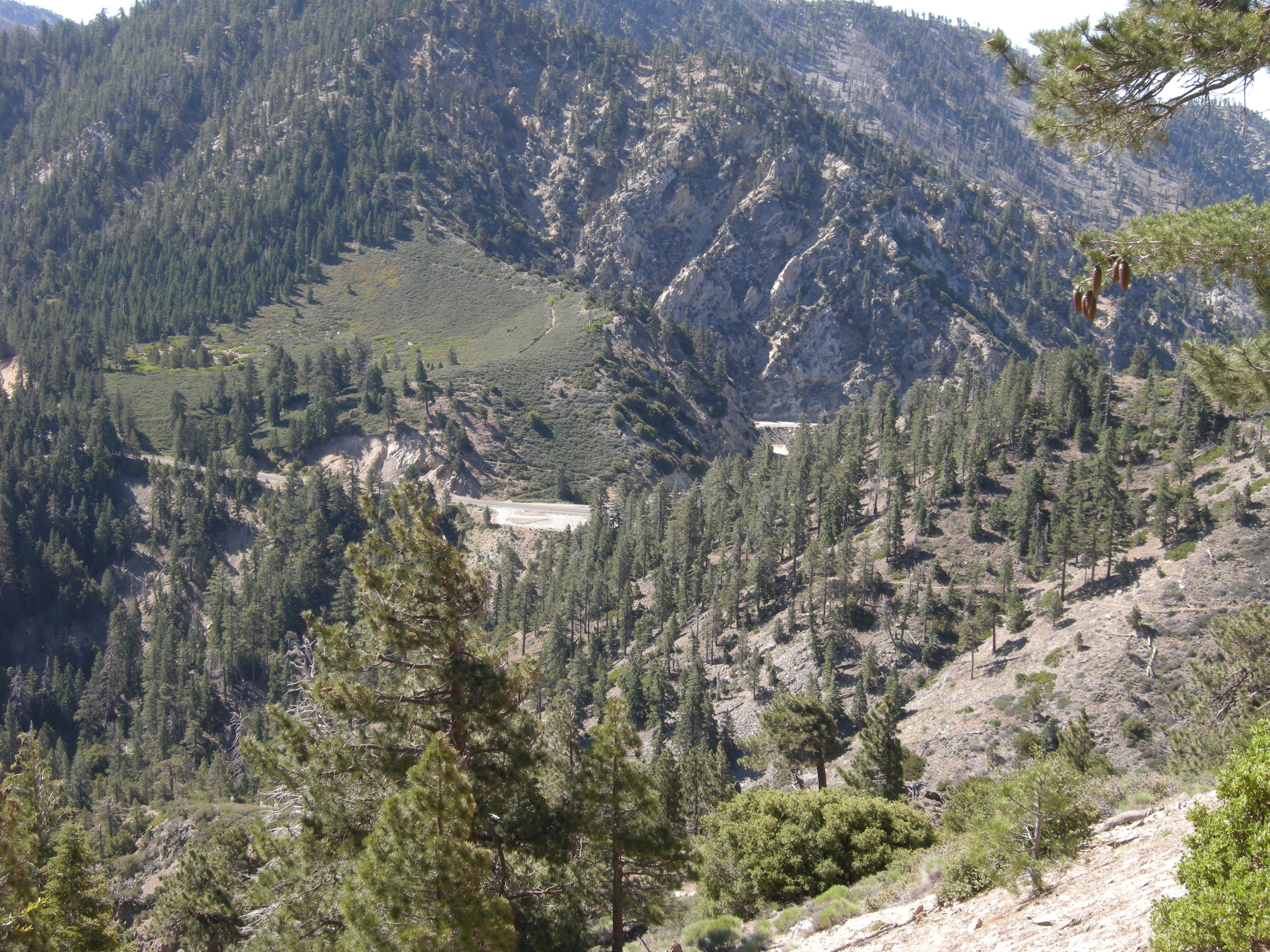
- Islip Saddle from the Mount Williamson Trail

- Location within the Los Angeles metropolitan area Location within California
- Elevation: 6,680 ft (2,040 m)
- Traversed by: SR 2 SR 39 (closed; at summit)

Third Approach
- Location: Los Angeles County, California
- Range: San Gabriel Mountains
- Coordinates: 34°21.40′N 117°51.06′W

Islip Saddle (/ˈaɪslɪp/ EYE-slip) is a saddle and mountain pass in Los Angeles County, California, United States. It lies just west of Mount Islip in the San Gabriel Mountains at the intersection of State Route 2 and the northern terminus of State Route 39. It is the second highest mountain pass on the highway after nearby Dawson Saddle.

== Name origin ==
Islip Saddle is named after Canadian homesteader George Islip, who lived in neighboring San Gabriel Canyon in the 1900s.

== Overview ==
Islip Saddle lies at the head of San Gabriel Canyon between Mount Williamson to the northwest and Mount Islip to the southeast.

The summit features a parking lot and public restrooms for visitors intending to hike in the area. A gate just east of the parking lot restricts access to Angeles Crest Highway between the saddle and Vincent Gap during the winter due to heavy snowfall. A second gate just south of the saddle permanently restricts access to the northern portion of State Route 39.

== Trailheads ==
There are three trailheads at Islip Saddle. Two of the trailheads are part of the Pacific Crest Trail which crosses Route 2 at the saddle. Islip Saddle can be reached from Mount Islip on the south side of the mountains, or by from the north side from Angeles Crest Highway or from Crystal Lake Recreation Area. Closest campground is the very popular Little Jimmy Trail Camp.

== See also ==
- List of mountain passes in California
- Angeles National Forest
