= California State Route 2 =

State highway in California

State Route 2
- SR 2 highlighted in red; the gap represents the relinquished portion

Route information
- Maintained by Caltrans and local jurisdictions
- Length: 86.24 mi (138.79 km) (broken into 4 pieces by US 101 and I-210. Also, portions of SR 2 have been relinquished to or are otherwise maintained by local or other governments, and are not included in the length)
- Existed: 1934–present
- Tourist routes: Angeles Crest Scenic Byway
- Restrictions: No trucks with 3 or more axles, or over 4.5 tons, between La Cañada Flintridge and Big Pines.; Segment between Islip Saddle and Vincent Gap is typically closed in winter.

Major junctions
- Southwest end: Centinela Avenue on the Santa Monica–Los Angeles line
- I-405 in Los Angeles; US 101 in Los Angeles; I-5 in Los Angeles; SR 134 in Los Angeles; I-210 from Glendale to La Cañada Flintridge; CR N3 / FH 59 in Angeles National Forest
- Northeast end: SR 138 on the Piñon Hills–Phelan line

Location
- Country: United States
- State: California
- Counties: Los Angeles, San Bernardino

Highway system
- State highways in California; Interstate; US; State; Scenic; History; Pre‑1964; Unconstructed; Deleted; Freeways
← SR 1	→ SR 3

State Route 2 (SR 2) is a state highway in the U.S. state of California. It connects the Los Angeles Basin with the San Gabriel Mountains and the Victor Valley in the Mojave Desert. The highway's southwestern end is at the intersection of Centinela Avenue at the Santa Monica-Los Angeles border and its northeastern end is at SR 138 east of Wrightwood. The SR 2 is divided into four segments, and it briefly runs concurrently with U.S. Route 101 (US 101) and Interstate 210 (I-210). The southwestern section of SR 2 runs along a segment of the east–west Santa Monica Boulevard, an old routing of US 66, to US 101 in East Hollywood; though some maps mark SR 2 as continuous through the cities of Santa Monica, Los Angeles, Beverly Hills and West Hollywood, control of segments within those cities were relinquished to those local jurisdictions and are thus no longer officially part of the state highway system. The second section of SR 2 runs from US 101 along segments of both the north–south Alvarado Street and Glendale Boulevard in Echo Park. The third section to I-210 in Glendale is known as the north–south Glendale Freeway. Finally, the northeastern portion from I-210 in La Cañada Flintridge to SR 138 is designated as the Angeles Crest Highway.

== Route description ==
Time-lapse video of an eastbound trip on California Route 2 in 2017; the trip includes both the urban and mountain portions of the route.

Route 2 is defined as follows in section 302, subdivision (a), of the California Streets and Highways Code:

Route 2 is from:
(1) The point where Santa Monica Boulevard crosses the city limits of Santa Monica at Centinela Avenue to Route 405 in Los Angeles.
(2) The point where Santa Monica Boulevard crosses the city limits of West Hollywood into the City of Los Angeles at La Brea Avenue to Route 101 in Los Angeles.
(3) Route 101 in Los Angeles to Route 210 in La Canada-Flintridge via Glendale.
(4) Route 210 in La Canada-Flintridge to Route 138 via Wrightwood.

The definition omits Route 2's concurrencies with Routes 101 and 210 instead of duplicating those segments in the other routes' definitions in the code. Also, control of the former portions of Route 2 have been relinquished by the state to the cities of Santa Monica, Los Angeles, Beverly Hills and West Hollywood. However, section 302 subdivision (b) further mandates that those cities with the relinquished former portions must still "maintain within their respective jurisdictions signs directing motorists to the continuation of Route 2". In addition, subdivision (c) permits the state to relinquish control of the remaining conventional highway portions of Route 2 located on Santa Monica Boulevard, Alvarado Street and Glendale Boulevard to the City of Los Angeles. If a relinquishment under this subdivision were to take effect, the western terminus of Route 2 would be relocated to the southwestern end of the Glendale Freeway at Glendale Boulevard in the neighborhood of Echo Park.

SR 2 is known as the Angeles Crest Scenic Byway, a National Forest Scenic Byway, from SR 2's east junction with I-210 in La Cañada Flintridge to the Los Angeles–San Bernardino county line. The Big Pines Highway is routed along SR 2 from County Route N4 (CR N4, the northwest continuation of the designation) in Big Pines to the Los Angeles–San Bernardino county line.

SR 2 is part of the California Freeway and Expressway System, and except for much of the mountain portion is part of the National Highway System, a network of highways that are considered essential to the country's economy, defense, and mobility by the Federal Highway Administration. SR 2 is eligible to be included in the State Scenic Highway System; however, only the portion of SR 2 from a point northeast of the I-210 interchange to the San Bernardino County line is actually designated as a scenic highway by the California Department of Transportation (Caltrans), meaning that it is a substantial section of highway passing through a "memorable landscape" with no "visual intrusions", where the potential designation has gained popular favor with the community.

=== SR 1 to the southeast junction with US 101 ===
The original official southwestern terminus of SR 2 was at the junction of Lincoln Boulevard, SR 1, and I-10 in Santa Monica. SR 2 then proceeded northwest on Lincoln Boulevard before turning northeast on Santa Monica Boulevard. Since the California Legislature relinquished segments of the highway, state control of SR 2 now officially begins at the point where Santa Monica Boulevard crosses the Santa Monica–Los Angeles city limits at Centinela Avenue. From Centinela Avenue, SR 2 heads northeast on Santa Monica Boulevard, where it heads northeast through West Los Angeles, Westwood, Century City, and Beverly Hills before entering West Hollywood. Santa Monica Boulevard, as a major street, is for most of its length at least four lanes wide.

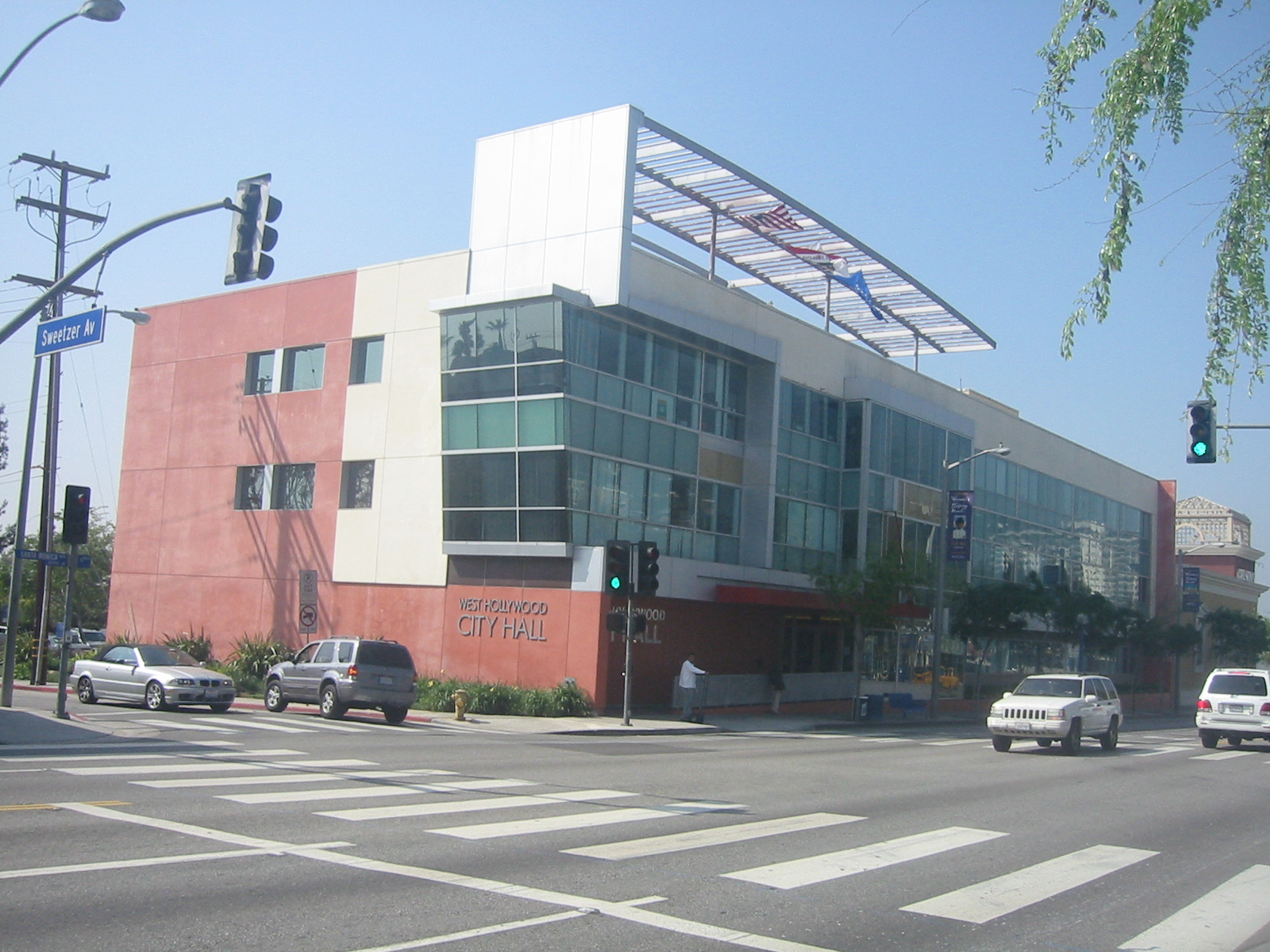
West Hollywood City Hall

At its west end, Santa Monica Boulevard starts off Ocean Avenue in Santa Monica. From there until Sepulveda Boulevard, Santa Monica Boulevard is a densely urban commercial street. Most of the Westside car dealerships are located on Santa Monica Boulevard. After Sepulveda, Santa Monica Boulevard passes Century City, and intersects Wilshire Boulevard in Beverly Hills.

The south roadway of Santa Monica Boulevard, often called Little Santa Monica Boulevard in Beverly Hills, runs parallel to the state highway (north) roadway of Santa Monica Boulevard from the city's west limit to Rexford Drive. After Rexford Drive, Little Santa Monica turns east, becoming Burton Way. Burton Way merges into San Vicente Boulevard at its intersection with La Cienega Boulevard. It is noted that the south roadway of Santa Monica Boulevard in Beverly Hills is a city street while the north roadway of Santa Monica Boulevard is a California state highway, each roadway handling bi-directional traffic.

After intersecting Wilshire, Santa Monica Boulevard continues northeast toward West Hollywood, spanning Beverly Boulevard and Melrose Avenue. At Holloway Drive, in the middle of West Hollywood, Santa Monica, now north of Melrose Avenue turns to the east. In West Hollywood, between Fairfax Avenue and Doheny Drive along Santa Monica Boulevard, bronze name plaques are embedded in the sidewalks as part of the West Hollywood Memorial Walk. SR 2 continues east through Hollywood on Santa Monica Boulevard to the Hollywood Freeway.

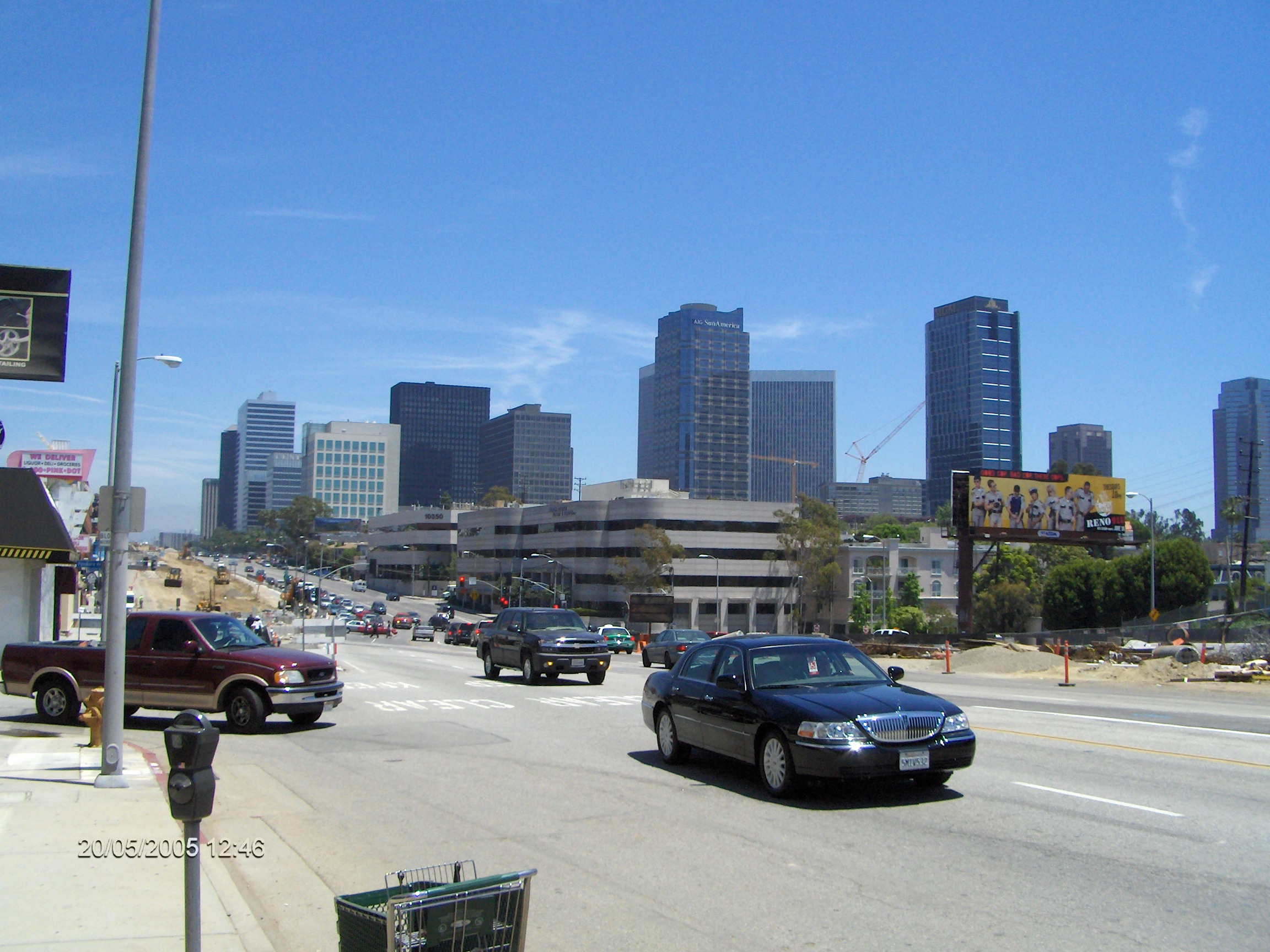
Santa Monica Boulevard at Century City

Route 2 then merges onto U.S. Route 101 (the Hollywood Freeway) and heads southeast leaving US 101 at the Alvarado Street exit.

=== Southeast junction with US 101 to I-210 ===
==== Alvarado Street and Glendale Boulevard ====
From US 101, Route 2 heads northeast on Alvarado Street through the community of Echo Park. The route then turns north onto Glendale Boulevard.

==== Glendale Freeway ====
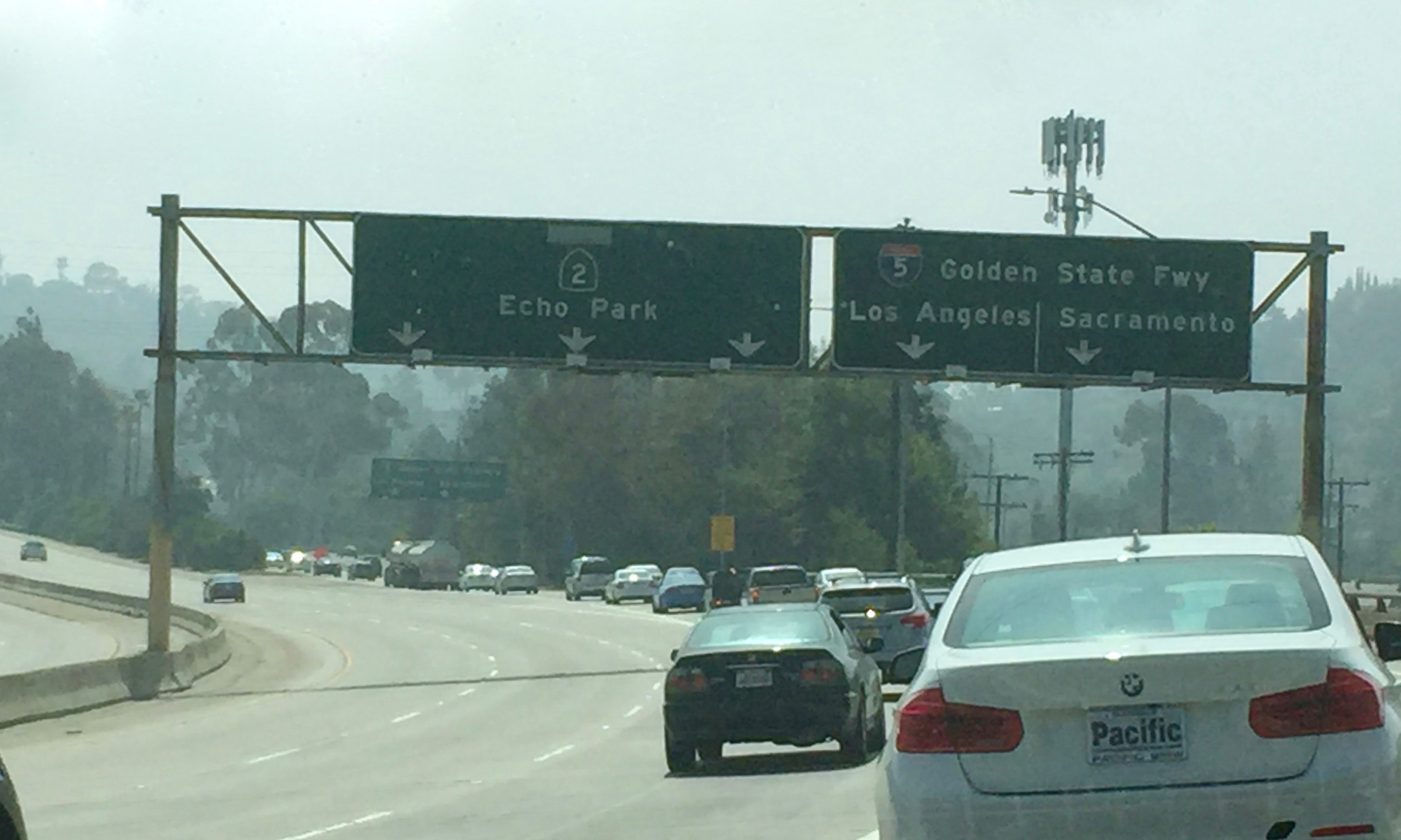
Junction of SR 2 and I-5 south of Glendale

After crossing Allesandro Street, Route 2 then branches northeast onto the Glendale Freeway, a north–south route. With five lanes each direction, the freeway is quite wide. It intersects the 5 Freeway (the Golden State Freeway) and then crosses the Los Angeles River, and runs through the communities of Glassell Park and Eagle Rock.

After its interchange with the eastern Ventura Freeway (SR 134), the Glendale Freeway route follows a ridge in the San Rafael Hills through eastern Glendale. The freeway ends in the Crescenta Valley, at Foothill Boulevard in La Cañada Flintridge. Just before reaching Foothill Boulevard, SR 2 turns off the Glendale Freeway onto the eastbound Foothill Freeway (Interstate 210) for a short distance until reaching the Angeles Crest Highway exit in La Cañada Flintridge.

The Glendale Freeway was originally proposed to continue through Echo Park all the way to Hollywood Freeway (101). Since that plan has been scrapped, the freeway is somewhat isolated from the remainder of the LA freeway system.

=== Angeles Crest Highway ===
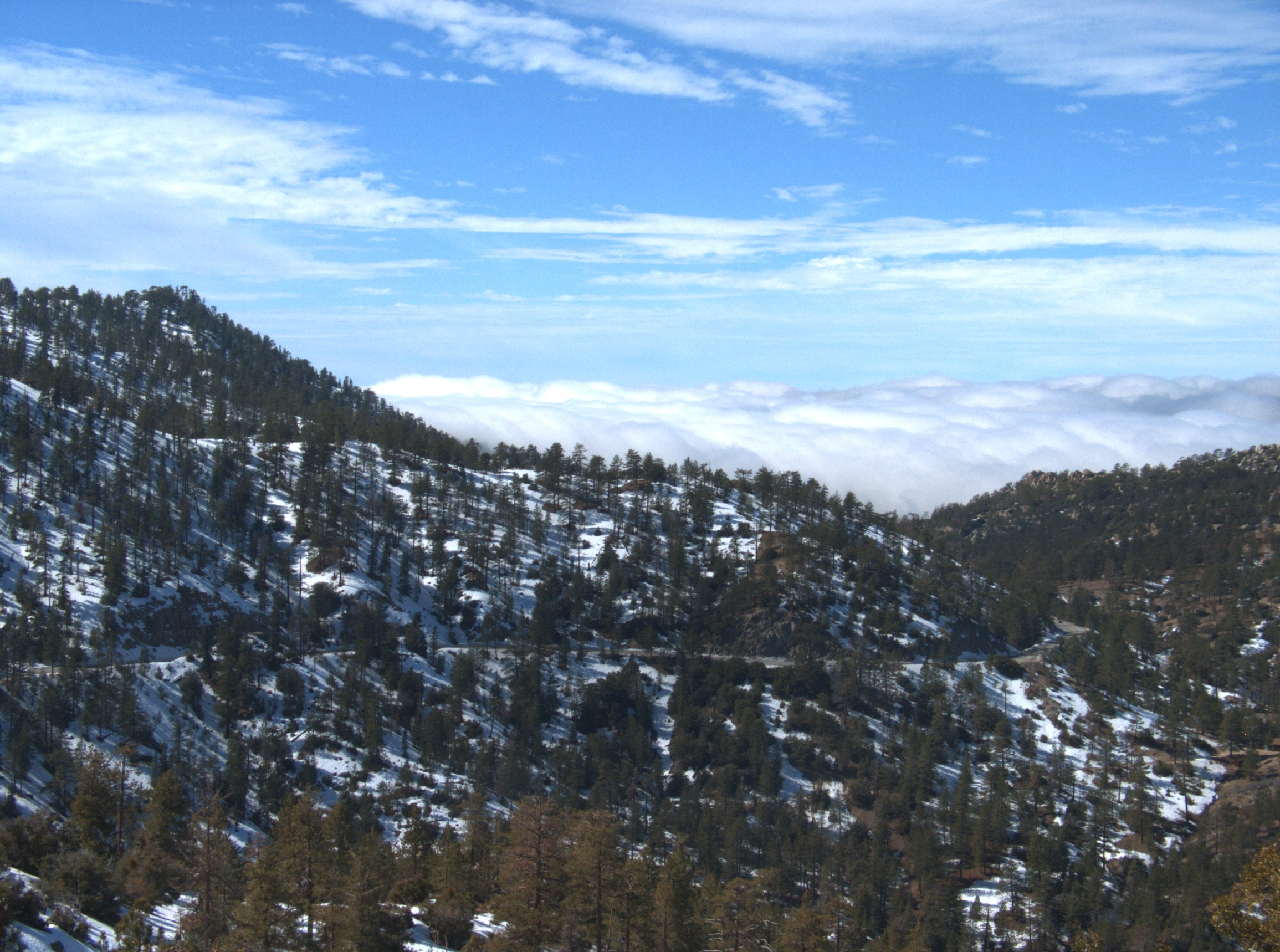
Angeles Crest Highway as it winds through the Angeles National Forest

Leaving La Cañada Flintridge at an altitude of 1,300 feet (400 m), the route turns north onto the Angeles Crest Highway. This route winds generally east-northeast through the canyons of the San Gabriel Mountains for over 80 miles (130 km), before descending through Big Pines and Wrightwood to the edge of the Victor Valley approximately 20 miles (32 km) west of Hesperia and ending at SR 138. The highway climbs to a high point of 7,903 feet (2,409 m) at Dawson Saddle. The eastern portions of the Angeles Crest Highway are notoriously dangerous, with many switchbacks and blind curves, and are often closed during occasions of heavy winter snowfall. The highway is generally closed between Islip Saddle and Vincent Gap from mid-December to mid-May due to snow and rockfall.

== History ==
=== Designation ===
In 1964, Route 2 was defined as a single route from Santa Monica to Wrightwood with no discontinuities. The segment of former US 66 on Santa Monica Boulevard west of the Hollywood Freeway and Lincoln Boulevard was added to Route 2 at this time, since US 66 was truncated to Pasadena. Route 2 became discontinuous at Routes 101 and 210 in 1965 and 1990, respectively.

Before the segment of the Glendale Freeway was built between Glendale Boulevard and just west of the Los Angeles River, Route 2 began at the Hollywood Freeway on Santa Monica Boulevard, continued east to Myra Avenue, then north on Myra Avenue, east on Fountain Avenue, northeast on Hyperion Avenue, southeast on Rowena Avenue, southeast on Glendale Boulevard, and northeast on Fletcher Drive to just west of the Los Angeles River. From west of the Los Angeles River, Route 2 continued on the Glendale Freeway to its temporary connection with Fletcher Drive at Avenue 38 and then followed the routing described in the previous paragraph to Route 138 northeast of Wrightwood.

Before the segment of the Glendale Freeway was built north of Glassell Park, Route 2 continued north on Fletcher Drive to Eagle Rock Boulevard, then north on Eagle Rock Boulevard to Verdugo Road, north on Verdugo to Cañada, north on Cañada back to Verdugo, and north and east on Verdugo to the Angeles Crest Highway (then Haskell Street).

=== Beverly Hills Freeway ===
Originally, it was to have been the Beverly Hills Freeway from Route 405 to Route 101 just east of Vermont Avenue, flowing onto the Glendale Freeway. In fact, the proposed freeway on Route 2 west of Route 101 was the original routing of the "Santa Monica Freeway" (a name which subsequently went to the distantly parallel Route 10). However, for a variety of political reasons, the department never reached agreement with Beverly Hills to build the segment through that city. At one time, the department considered building a cut-and-cover tunnel under Beverly Hills, but even this proved a non-starter, and the freeway plan west of Route 101 was quietly cancelled in 1975. Currently, the Glendale Freeway begins as a stub at Glendale Boulevard. A freeway-wide bridge was built over Glendale Boulevard in hopes that the freeway would be built further west. Today, the bridge serves as the westbound lanes of Route 2, connecting the southwestbound freeway lanes to southbound Glendale Boulevard. A more modest freeway/expressway extension to Route 101 has been discussed.

Planners originally intended for it to connect to the Hollywood Freeway with Route 101 near the Vermont Avenue interchange, but community opposition killed the project by the 1960s (which is why there is a huge median around the cancelled interchange today). The Glendale Freeway offers stunning vistas of the eastern San Fernando Valley, the Verdugo Mountains, the Crescenta Valley, and the San Gabriel Mountains.

In the 1960s, the city of Beverly Hills had begun a transition from a quasi-exurban retreat for the entertainment industry to its current status as one of the world's premier shopping and culinary destinations. Building a freeway along Santa Monica Boulevard, the northwestern border of the city's emergent "Golden Triangle" shopping district, did not fit into city fathers' vision for Beverly Hills' development. Moreover, it was feared that a freeway would exacerbate the already evident divisions between the fabulously wealthy residents of the hilly areas north of Santa Monica Boulevard and the merely affluent ones to the south. A proposed cut-and-cover tunnel for the freeway failed to generate sufficient political support, and by the mid-1970s the project was essentially dead.

California State Senator (later Congressman) Anthony Beilenson was one of the leading opponents of the project.

Caltrans' decision not to build the freeway was both harmful and beneficial to the areas along its proposed route. The massive Century City high-rise commercial development just west of the Beverly Hills city limits was built with freeway access in mind. For many Century City workers who live in Los Angeles' eastern suburbs, the quickest way home takes them through the residential district of Cheviot Hills, which has caused consternation among its well-heeled residents. For Beverly Hills, the decision helped preserve much of its emergent downtown, but at the cost of creating gridlock on Wilshire Boulevard and I-10.

=== Further construction ===
The first segment of freeway was built in the 1950s and ran from just west of the Los Angeles River to Avenue 38 in Glassell Park. This portion was at one time named the Allesandro Freeway, because it runs next to Allesandro Street. The last segment of freeway, from Route 134 to Route 210, was built between 1972 and 1975.

Starting in July 1964, Route 2 began in Santa Monica at its junction with Routes 1 and 10. After heading a few blocks northwest on Lincoln Boulevard, the route turned northeast on Santa Monica Boulevard, just several blocks from the Pacific Ocean. The route continued on Santa Monica Boulevard to Centinela Avenue.

For its entire length, until the tracks were removed, Santa Monica Boulevard followed the tracks of the Pacific Electric Railway. In the portion from Holloway Drive in West Hollywood to Sepulveda Boulevard in West Los Angeles, the tracks were in a separate right-of-way, with two roadways, one on each side of the tracks. For the rest of the route, the tracks ran in the traffic lanes.

Except for a short portion at its eastern end, Santa Monica Boulevard was adopted as a state highway in 1933. From 1934 to 1936, it was signed as State Route 2. Then it became U.S. Route 66. When U.S. Route 66 was truncated to Pasadena in 1964, Santa Monica Boulevard once again became State Route 2 as far east as the Hollywood Freeway. Today, the State Route 2 portion of Santa Monica Boulevard is defined from the Santa Monica/Los Angeles city limits to US 101.

From 1936 to 1964, U.S. Route 66 ran along Lincoln Boulevard from its junction with Alternate U. S. 101 (now California Route 1) and California Route 26 (now replaced by Interstate 10) to Santa Monica Boulevard and along Santa Monica Boulevard from Lincoln Boulevard to the Hollywood Freeway. US 66 turned southeast on the Hollywood Freeway with US 101. At that time, Route 2 began on Alvarado Street at the Hollywood Freeway. As is today, Route 2 traversed Alvarado Street and Glendale Boulevard to the Glendale Freeway. Route 2 continued on the Glendale Freeway to a temporary connection with Fletcher Drive at Avenue 38 in the Atwater district of Los Angeles. From the temporary connection, the route ran northeast on Fletcher Drive, and north on Verdugo Road to its south intersection with Cañada Boulevard in Glendale. From the south intersection, Route 2 headed north on Cañada Boulevard to its north intersection with Verdugo Road, north on Verdugo Road, and east on Verdugo Boulevard, before reaching Foothill Boulevard in La Canada Flintridge. Route 2 continued approximately one mile southeast on Foothill Boulevard with California Route 118 to Angeles Crest Highway. From Foothill Boulevard, Route 2 continued north on Angeles Crest Highway, where it continues to this day.

Today, the California Transportation Commission is relinquishing the street-running parts of Route 2 to local cities which it runs through. In 1996, state law was changed to permit the relinquishment of Route 2 in Santa Monica and West Hollywood. When the relinquishment in Santa Monica went through in 1998, the portion from Route 1 to Centinela Avenue was deleted. The law was changed again in 2001 to allow Route 2 from Route 405 to Moreno Drive to be relinquished to the City of Los Angeles. In 2003 California Senate Bill 315 was chaptered, acknowledging the relinquishments within Santa Monica, West Hollywood, and from Route 405 to Moreno Drive in Los Angeles, and permitting the relinquishment of Route 2 in Beverly Hills. Whether Route 2 west of Route 101 will stay as a paper route after relinquishment is yet to be determined.

Since the 1950s, proposals have been made to extend the Glendale Freeway to the Antelope Valley Freeway via a tunnel under the San Gabriels, relieving some of the latter freeway's notorious congestion. The difficulty of designing and building such a route through the mountains (designated SR 249) and the cost of insuring it against earthquakes and terrorism would undoubtedly make perpetually cash-strapped Caltrans unable to undertake such an ambitious project.

== In popular culture ==
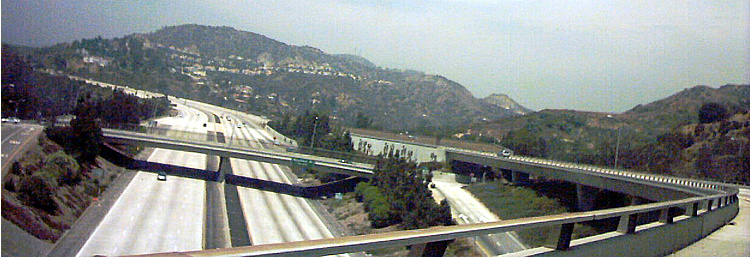
Because of its relatively short length, the Glendale Freeway is often less congested in comparison to other Los Angeles freeways. The overpass from which this picture was taken was featured as a "collapsing" bridge in the 1974 disaster film Earthquake.

The section of freeway between the Ventura Freeway (134) and the Foothill Freeway (210) was largely completed in late 1972, but not fully finished until late spring 1978. During this five year period, the section from just north of the 134 Ventura freeway to approximately Mountain St (Glendale College) was not built. During this time, the closed freeway and an on/off ramp at Verdugo Blvd in Montrose were used as a location for several films due to its relatively complete construction status, and its proximity to major movie studios in Southern California. Some of these productions included Coffy, Corvette Summer, The Gumball Rally, Death Race 2000, Cannonball, Hardcore, and several American television series including Adam-12, Emergency! and CHiPs. The transition overpass from the eastbound Ventura Freeway to the northbound Glendale Freeway was prominently featured in the notorious disaster film Earthquake when a livestock truck and two cars crash over the side of the overpass (a shot completed in miniature special effects). Ever since it was opened in 1978, this section of freeway is still relatively lightly traveled (especially on weekends), and is still utilized as a filming location, with filming typically done early on weekend mornings.

== Major intersections ==
Except where prefixed with a letter, postmiles were measured on the road as it was in 1964, based on the alignment that existed at the time, and do not necessarily reflect current mileage. Postmile prefixes include: R reflecting a realignment in the route since then, M indicating a second realignment, L referring to an overlap due to a correction or change, and T indicating postmiles classified as temporary. Segments that remain unconstructed or have been relinquished to local control may be omitted. The numbers reset at county lines; the start and end postmiles in each county are given in the county column.

County	Location	Postmile	Exit	Destinations	Notes
Los Angeles; LA L0.00-82.27	Santa Monica	L0.00 (Note: Postmiles are measured from SR 2's original southwestern end at the I-10/SR 1, before that segment east to Centinela Ave. was deleted and relinquished to local control.)		SR 1 south (Lincoln Boulevard)	Continuation beyond I-10
Los Angeles; LA L0.00-82.27	Santa Monica	L0.00		I-10 east (Santa Monica Freeway) / SR 1 north (Pacific Coast Highway)	Interchange; southwestern end of SR 2; I-10 east exit 1A, west exit 1B
Los Angeles; LA L0.00-82.27	Santa Monica–Los Angeles line	2.31		Centinela Avenue	Southwestern end of state maintenance
Los Angeles; LA L0.00-82.27	Los Angeles	3.65		I-405 (San Diego Freeway)	Interchange; former SR 7; I-405 exit 55A; northeastern end of state maintenance
Los Angeles; LA L0.00-82.27	Los Angeles	3.80		Sepulveda Boulevard	
Los Angeles; LA L0.00-82.27	Beverly Hills	6.20		Wilshire Boulevard	
Los Angeles; LA L0.00-82.27	West Hollywood	8.69		La Cienega Boulevard	
Los Angeles; LA L0.00-82.27	West Hollywood	9.57		Fairfax Avenue	
Los Angeles; LA L0.00-82.27	West Hollywood–Los Angeles line	10.62		La Brea Avenue	Western end of state maintenance
Los Angeles; LA L0.00-82.27	Los Angeles	10.90		Highland Avenue	Former SR 170
Los Angeles; LA L0.00-82.27	Los Angeles	12.74 5.55 (Note: Indicates that the postmile represents the distance along US 101 rather than SR 2.)		US 101 north (Hollywood Freeway) / Western Avenue / Santa Monica Boulevard – Ventura	Western end of US 101 overlap; interchange; US 101 exit 7; Santa Monica Boulevard was former US 66 east
Los Angeles; LA L0.00-82.27	Los Angeles	12.74 5.55	Western end of freeway on US 101		
Los Angeles; LA L0.00-82.27	Los Angeles	4.85	6B	Melrose Avenue, Normandie Avenue	
Los Angeles; LA L0.00-82.27	Los Angeles	4.40	6A	Vermont Avenue	
Los Angeles; LA L0.00-82.27	Los Angeles	3.76	5B	Silver Lake Boulevard	
Los Angeles; LA L0.00-82.27	Los Angeles	3.34	5A	Rampart Boulevard, Benton Way	
Los Angeles; LA L0.00-82.27	Los Angeles	2.86 12.75	Eastern end of freeway on US 101		
Los Angeles; LA L0.00-82.27	Los Angeles	2.86 12.75		US 101 south (Hollywood Freeway) / Alvarado Street – Los Angeles	Eastern end of US 101 overlap; interchange; US 101 exit 4B
Los Angeles; LA L0.00-82.27	Los Angeles	13.19		Sunset Boulevard	Former US 66
Los Angeles; LA L0.00-82.27	Los Angeles	13.59		Glendale Boulevard south	
Los Angeles; LA L0.00-82.27	Los Angeles	13.92	Southern end of Glendale Freeway		
Los Angeles; LA L0.00-82.27	Los Angeles	14.21	12	Glendale Boulevard north	Southbound exit; SR 2 south merges onto Glendale Boulevard south; no access from Glendale Boulevard south to SR 2 north
Los Angeles; LA L0.00-82.27	Los Angeles	14.95	13A	Riverside Drive	Signed as exit 13 northbound
Los Angeles; LA L0.00-82.27	Los Angeles	15.14	13A	I-5 (Golden State Freeway) – Santa Ana, Los Angeles, Sacramento	Signed as exit 13 northbound; I-5 north exits 139A-B; south exit 139
Los Angeles; LA L0.00-82.27	Los Angeles	15.52	13B	Fletcher Drive	Southbound exit and northbound entrance
Los Angeles; LA L0.00-82.27	Los Angeles	16.01	14	San Fernando Road	Former US 6 / US 99
Los Angeles; LA L0.00-82.27	Los Angeles	R17.00	15A	Verdugo Road	Signed as exit 15 northbound
Los Angeles; LA L0.00-82.27	Los Angeles	R17.29	15B	York Boulevard	Southbound exit and northbound entrance
Los Angeles; LA L0.00-82.27	Los Angeles	R18.52	16	Colorado Boulevard, Broadway	Northbound exit and southbound entrance
Los Angeles; LA L0.00-82.27	Los Angeles	R18.81	17B	SR 134 (Ventura Freeway) – Pasadena, Ventura	Signed as exits 17A (east) and 17B (west) northbound; SR 134 east exit 9A, west exit 9B
Los Angeles; LA L0.00-82.27	Glendale	R19.05	17C	Holly Drive	Signed as exit 17A southbound
Los Angeles; LA L0.00-82.27	Glendale	R20.05	18	Mountain Street	
Los Angeles; LA L0.00-82.27	Glendale	R23.00	21A	Verdugo Boulevard – Montrose	Northbound exit and southbound entrance
Los Angeles; LA L0.00-82.27	Glendale	R23.16 R18.87 (Note: Indicates that the postmile represents the distance along I-210 rather than SR 2.)	21B	I-210 west (Foothill Freeway) – San Fernando, Sacramento	Southwestern end of I-210 overlap; northern end of Glendale Freeway; SR 2 south follows I-210 exit 19
Los Angeles; LA L0.00-82.27	Glendale	R23.44	21C	Foothill Boulevard	Northbound exit and southbound entrance; former SR 118
Los Angeles; LA L0.00-82.27	La Cañada Flintridge	R19.88 24.41	Northeastern end of freeway on I-210		
Los Angeles; LA L0.00-82.27	La Cañada Flintridge	R19.88 24.41		I-210 east (Foothill Freeway) / Angeles Crest Highway – Pasadena	Northeastern end of I-210 overlap; interchange; I-210 exit 20
Los Angeles; LA L0.00-82.27		33.80		CR N3 (Angeles Forest Highway) – Palmdale	
Los Angeles; LA L0.00-82.27		64.09	Islip Saddle, elevation 6,658 feet (2,029 m)		
Los Angeles; LA L0.00-82.27		64.09		SR 39 south (San Gabriel Canyon Road)	Closed
Los Angeles; LA L0.00-82.27		64.15	Eastbound winter closure gate		
Los Angeles; LA L0.00-82.27	Vincent Gap	74.72	Westbound winter closure gate		
Los Angeles; LA L0.00-82.27	Big Pines	79.88		CR N4 (Big Pines Highway) to SR 138 / Table Mountain Road – Jackson Lake, Palmdale	
San Bernardino; SBD 0.00-6.36	Mountain Top Junction	6.36		SR 138 – San Bernardino, Palmdale	Northeastern end of SR 2
1.000 mi = 1.609 km; 1.000 km = 0.621 mi: Closed/former; Concurrency terminus; Incomplete access
