= Angeles Crest Highway =

Highway in California

Angeles Crest Highway
- Angeles Crest Highway highlighted in red

Route information
- Maintained by Caltrans
- Length: 66 mi (106 km)
- Existed: 1934–present
- Tourist routes: Angeles Crest Scenic Byway
- Restrictions: No trucks with 3 or more axles, or over 4.5 tons between La Cañada Flintridge and Big Pines.; Segment between Islip Saddle and Vincent Gap is typically closed in winter.

Major junctions
- West end: Foothill Boulevard in La Cañada Flintridge
- I-210 / SR 2 in La Cañada Flintridge
- East end: SR 138 at the Piñon Hills–Phelan border

Location
- Country: United States
- State: California
- Counties: Los Angeles, San Bernardino

Highway system
- State highways in California; Interstate; US; State; Scenic; History; Pre‑1964; Unconstructed; Deleted; Freeways

The Angeles Crest Highway is a 66-mile (106 km) two-lane highway over the San Gabriel Mountains in Southern California. It runs through the San Gabriel Mountains National Monument and the Angeles National Forest. With the exception of a 1,000-foot-long (300 m) section in La Cañada Flintridge, the entire route is part of California State Route 2.

The road's western terminus is at the intersection at Foothill Boulevard in La Cañada Flintridge, and its eastern terminus at the Pearblossom Highway (State Route 138) northeast of Wrightwood. The majority of the route passes through the San Gabriel Mountains located north of the Greater Los Angeles Area. Segments of the road reach elevations above 7,000 feet (2,100 m), with a summit of 7,903 feet (2,409 m) at the Dawson Saddle, which makes this road one of the highest in Southern California.

The segment from La Cañada Flintridge to the Los Angeles–San Bernardino county line is known as the Angeles Crest Scenic Byway, which is both a National Forest Scenic Byway and an officially designated California Scenic Highway.

== Route description ==
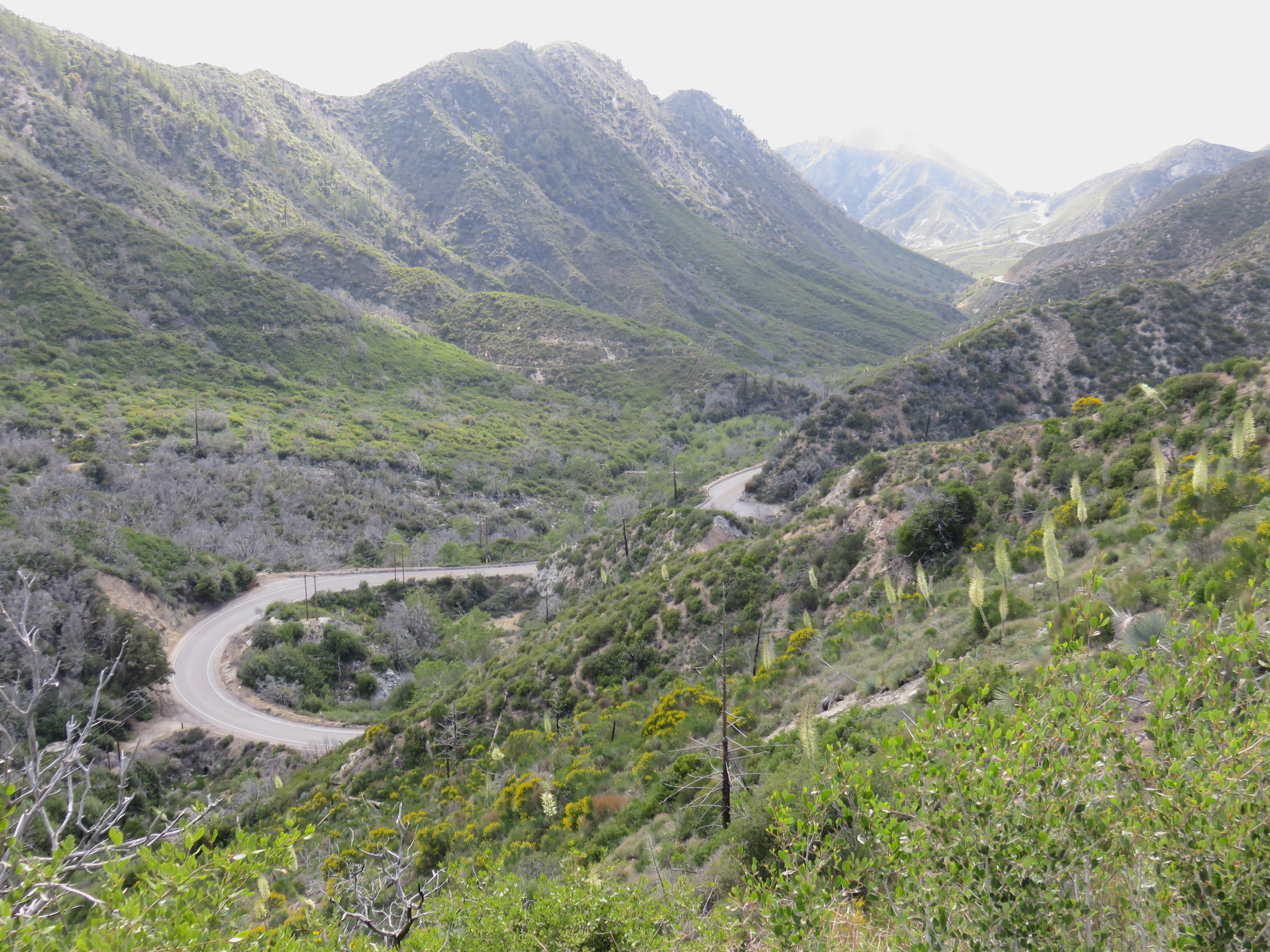
Angeles Crest Highway winds through a valley just west of Red Box Saddle

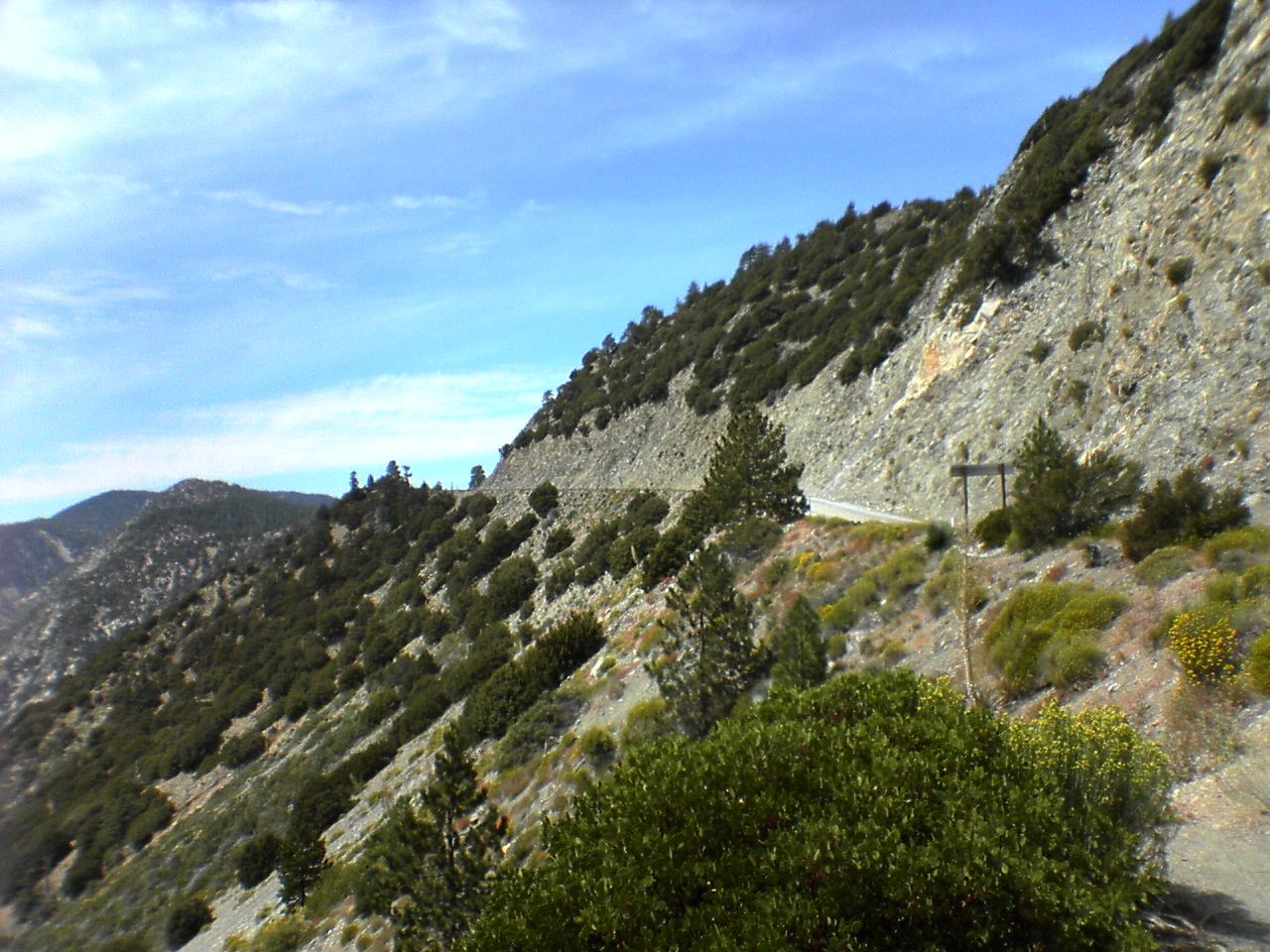
Angeles Crest Highway in the Angeles National Forest

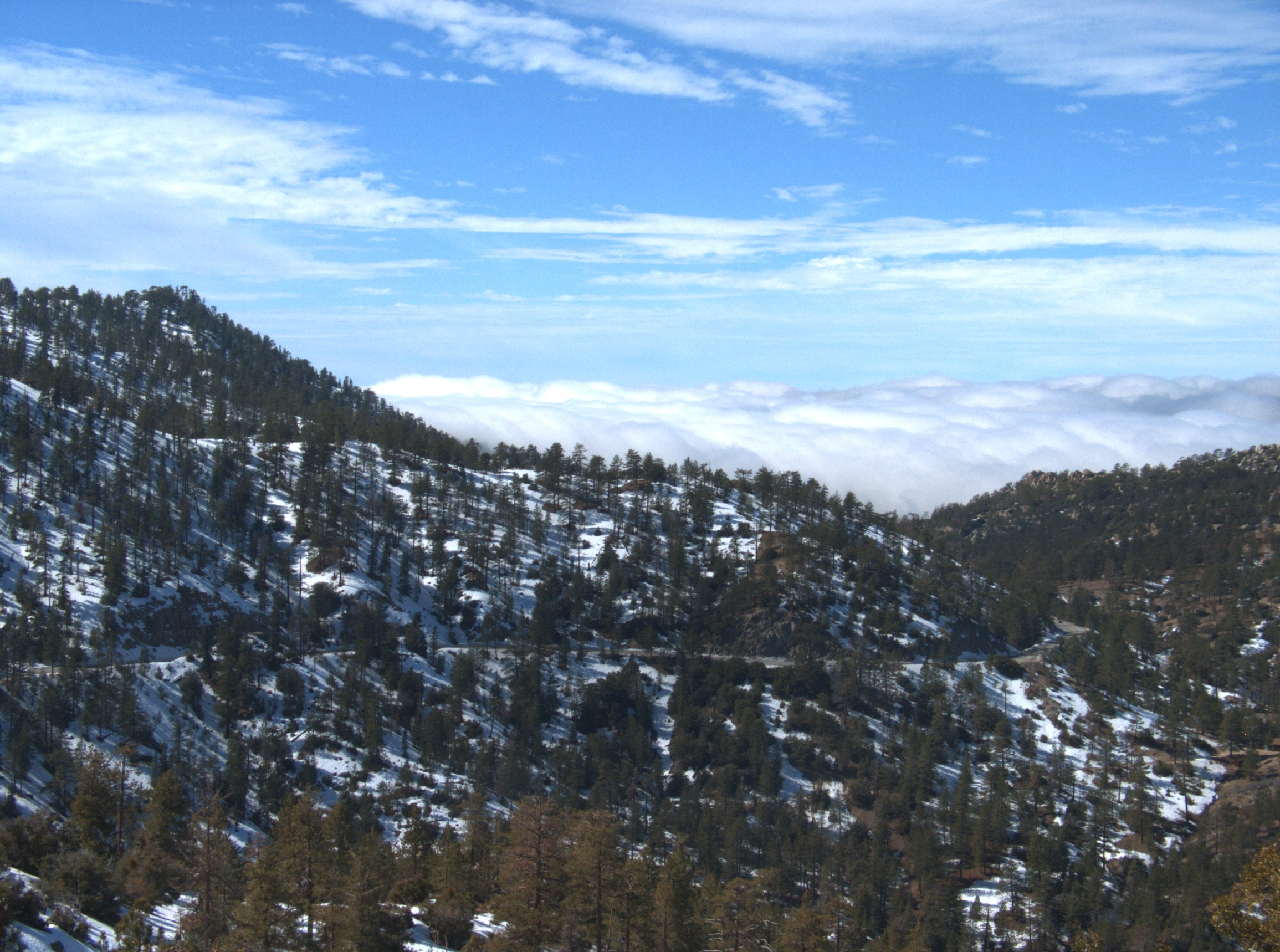
The Angeles Crest Highway winds through the mountains. The clouds in the distance cover Los Angeles.

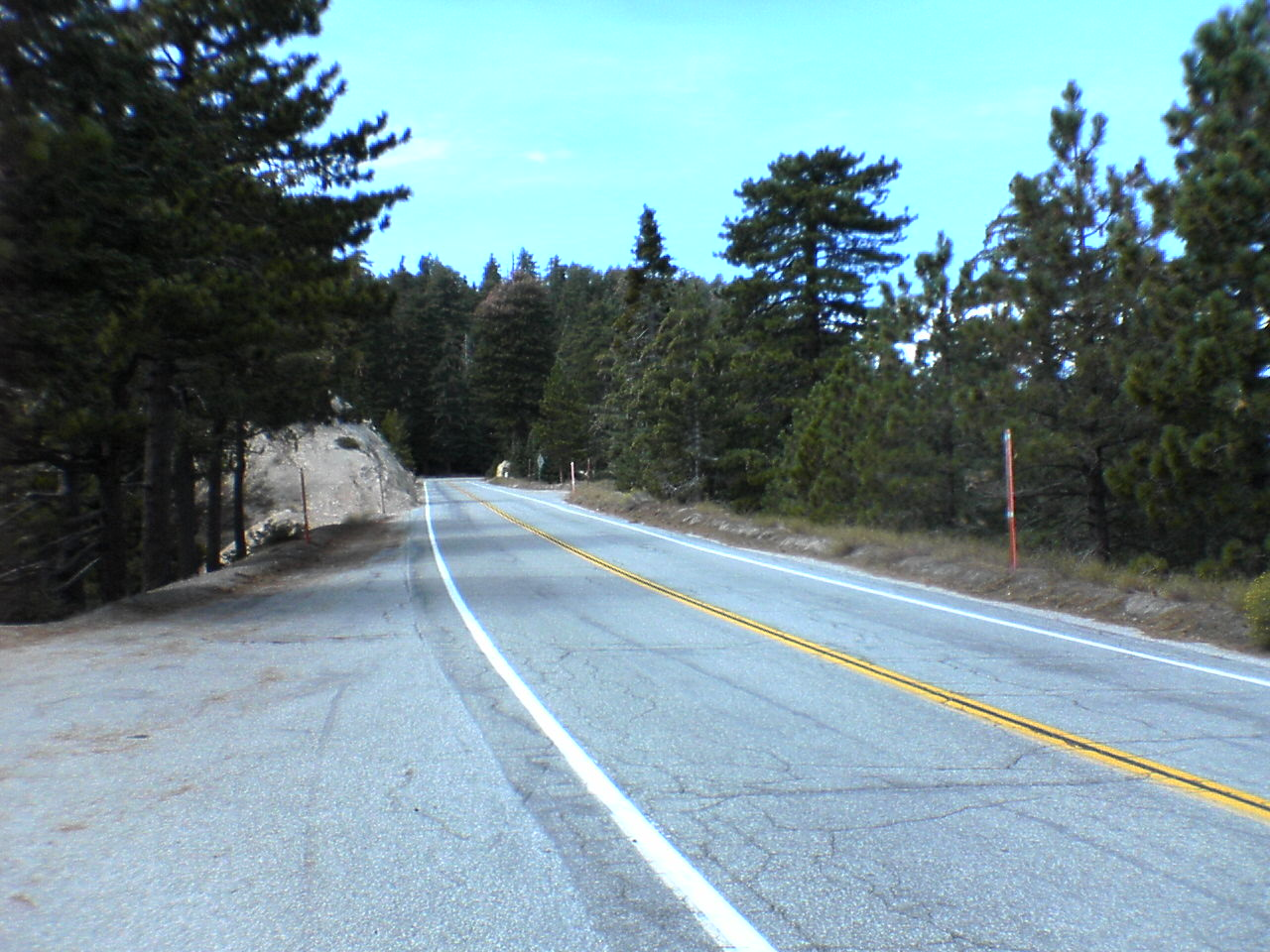
The Angeles Crest Highway in the Angeles National Forest

The route is best described as mountain-rural. Because the route passes through the protected San Gabriel Mountains National Monument and Angeles National Forest, development is very limited. There are not many buildings between La Cañada Flintridge and Wrightwood save for Newcomb's Ranch, and forest service campgrounds and visitor centers. Other points of interest along the route include the Mountain High and Mt. Waterman ski areas.

Mount Wilson and its Mount Wilson Observatory and various radio/television transmitters are about 4.5 miles from the junction of Mount Wilson Road and Angeles Crest Highway. Depending on visibility conditions, impressive views of the Los Angeles Basin are possible from the vicinity of Mount Wilson. The most frequent hindrances of what can be seen are the smog and/or a marine layer covering the basin below.

The westernmost segment of the highway, combined with Angeles Forest Highway to/from State Route 14, is heavily travelled by southbound traffic in the morning (and corresponding northbound traffic in the afternoon) that comprises commuters who live in the Antelope Valley and work in the Greater Los Angeles Area. The route is a convenient alternative to the Antelope Valley Freeway (State Route 14) and the Golden State Freeway (Interstate 5), both located to the west, for reaching the Foothill Freeway (Interstate 210) and San Gabriel Valley. Because the road is a two-lane highway, its vehicle capacity is significantly lower than either of the two freeways.

In contrast, the remainder of the Angeles Crest Highway is lightly traveled. Typically, this traffic is composed of vacationers, sightseers, and locals. The three areas comprising Mountain High ski resort are just west of Wrightwood.

== History ==
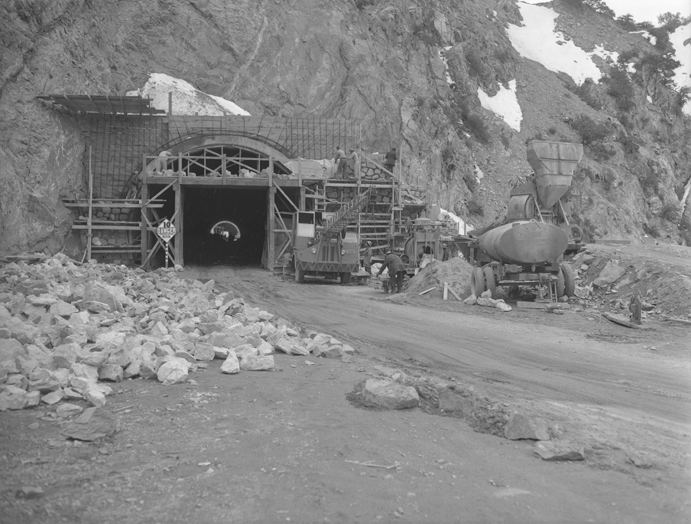
Tunneling through San Gabriel Range for Angeles Crest Highway, 1949

Construction of Angeles Crest Highway began in 1929. It was originally intended to be a fire access road. In 1941 construction stopped because of World War II. In 1946, after the war, construction resumed; the completed highway eventually opened in 1956. The road was constructed by prison labor from Camp 37, which has since been razed. Division of Highways (now known as Caltrans) staff lived at a site called Cedar Springs. The staff is now located at Chilao Flats. Children of the staff attended Chilao Mountain School, a one-room school; the school has been closed for several years.

Angeles Crest Highway was originally planned to be upgraded to a freeway in the 1950s, but was later considered geographically improbable and the plans were abandoned.

Roads in the San Gabriel Mountains have a high number of single-vehicle auto and motorcycle accidents. As an example, in the predawn hours of December 8, 2004, a van plunged off the side of Angeles Forest Highway at about 1-mile (1.6 km) north of its junction with the Angeles Crest Highway, killing 3 of the 10 people in the van. The van was a carpool carrying workers of the Jet Propulsion Laboratory from the Antelope Valley to work in Pasadena. It was determined upon investigation by the CHP that the driver fell asleep at the wheel of the van. The Angeles Crest Highway and Angeles Forest Highway have figured in various murders, not as scenes of the murders but as drop-off points for the bodies of the victims, including that of Linda Sobek, a model kidnapped and found dead in the area in 1995.

The motion picture Donnie Darko, released in 2001, was partially filmed on Angeles Crest Highway. In the opening scene with Donnie waking up in the middle of the road, next to his bike, the camera zooms in on Donnie, then loops around and shows a view of the valley seen from Angeles Crest Highway. The highway is also used later in the movie for other scenes. The Angeles Crest Highway is also used extensively in the motion picture The Love Bug for racing scenes, as well as in the sequel film Herbie Goes to Monte Carlo, where the highway doubles for "The French Alps".

== Access and closures ==
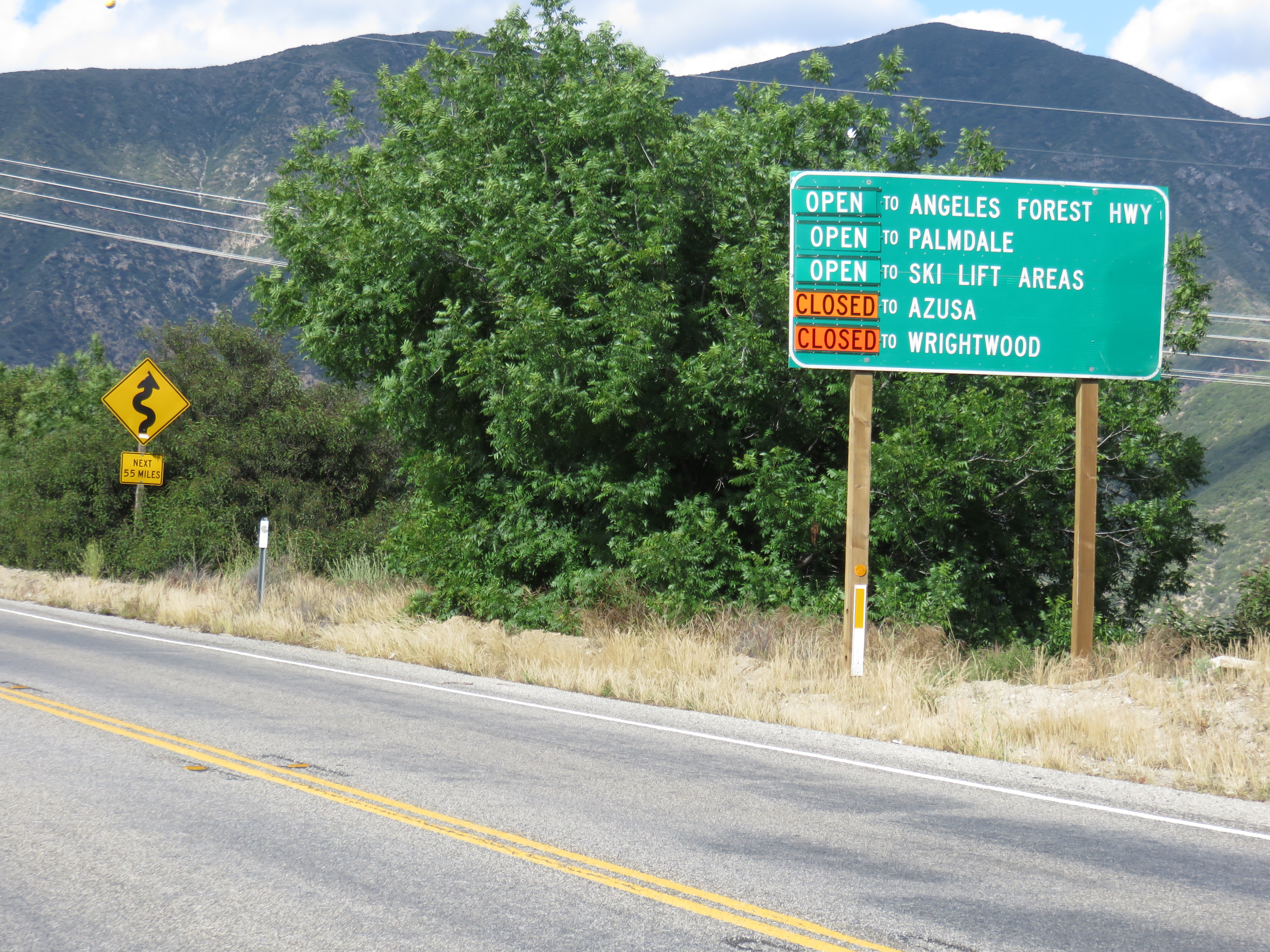
Signage near the western terminus warning of road closures

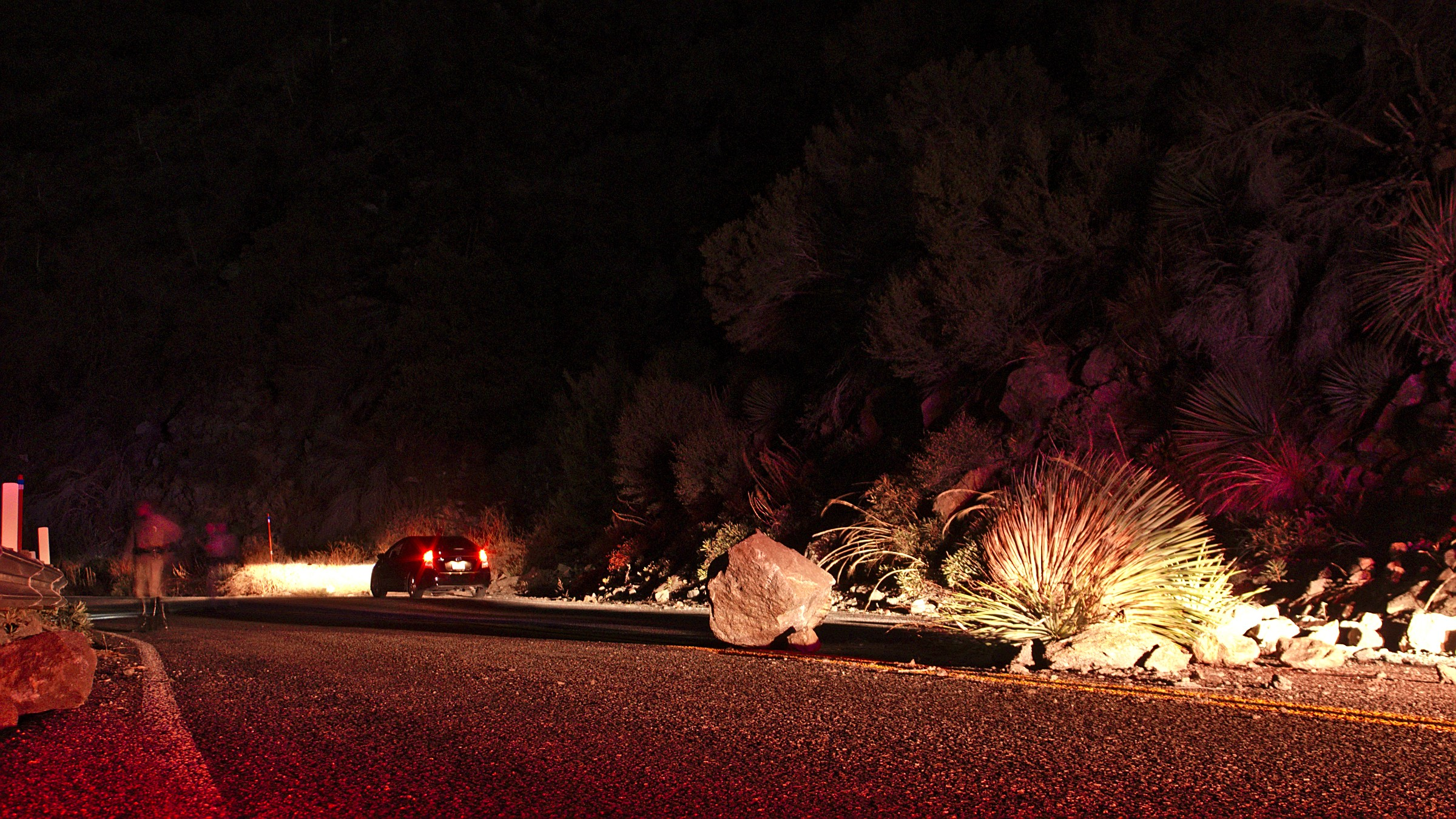
Debris being removed by the Highway Patrol

Intersections with other roads are few, which can be problematic in the event of road closures due to acts of nature such as landslides and fires. At about the midpoint of the highway is the junction with the north terminus of State Route 39. However, access to State Route 39 is not possible as it is closed indefinitely to automobile traffic because of persistent landslides along its route. Therefore, travelers to the Angeles National Forest preferring the Angeles Crest Highway corridor should expect to be on the Angeles Crest Highway throughout much of its length, use available alternate routing where possible, or be willing to turn around and retrace their trip at any point along its route if necessary.

The Angeles Crest Highway is normally closed in the winter from Islip Saddle to Vincent Gap due to rockfall and avalanche hazards.

The winter storms of 2004/05 caused several landslides and significant damage to the highway. Thus, the highway never reopened in the summer of 2005. Damage to the highway was estimated to be over $4 million as of November 2005. Terri Kasinga, a spokeswoman for the California Department of Transportation, stated in November 2005 "It is definitely not going to open until next spring (of 2006)". However, a March 2006 storm caused even more extensive damage to the highway, including a complete washout of a large section of roadway, further delaying the reopening of the highway. The long closure caused concern for the United States Forest Service and other emergency services agencies because it hindered access, particularly with firefighting efforts, and it hurt business in Wrightwood. After a four-and-a-half year closure, the highway reopened on May 20, 2009. Repairs included the construction of a new bridge intended to allow landslides to pass underneath without damaging the road. The work cost $10.5 million.

A moratorium on three-axles trucks was imposed in 2009 following the deaths of two people when a tractor trailer lost control and crashed into a La Cañada Flintridge business (other California highways have similar truck bans such as I-580 and SR 85 but have been implemented for different reasons).

Cell phone reception is sporadic and signal strength and clarity are poor, due to the terrain and distance from cellular communication antennas.

The Federal Lands Recreation Enhancement Act passed in December 2004, protects the Angeles National Forest. Although anyone can park at the side of the road and access the wilderness along the side of the road, doing so for extended periods of time, such as camping or hiking, requires a National Forest Adventure Pass available for a $5.00 fee.

=== 2009 Station Fire closure ===
During the 2009 wildfire season the large fire known as the "Station Fire" burned the mountains through which Route 2 travels. The fire damaged the signs, guardrails, and lane striping, as well as leaving large boulders and other debris all over the road. As a result, the highway was closed by Caltrans until November 30, 2009. It was briefly re-opened until mud and rock slides in early 2010 forced a portion of the highway to be closed again from 2 miles east of the I-210 junction to 14 miles east of La Cañada Flintridge. It reopened on June 3, 2011.

== See also ==
- Angeles National Forest−related topics
- San Gabriel Mountains National Monument−related topics
