= Crystal Lake Recreation Area =

Angeles National Forest, California

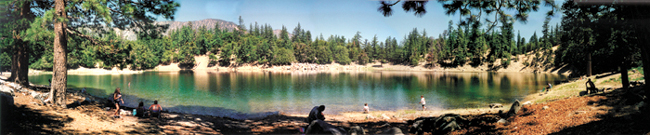
Crystal Lake in Angeles National Forest, Azusa, California. Photo taken in July 1998 after a rainy season following a period of El Niño.

The Crystal Lake Recreation Area is located in the San Gabriel Mountains of Southern California, administered by the San Gabriel Mountains National Monument (formally the San Gabriel River Ranger District) of the United States Forest Service. The Recreation Area consists of a small lake, an open-air amphitheater, a large public campground containing approximately 120 camp sites grouped into "loops," and a group campground called Deer Flats which consists of approximately 25 camp sites. The Recreation Area contains a United States Forest Service visitor center and a cafe which is open to the public from dawn to dusk except for Tuesdays when the cafe is closed. Within the Recreation Area are 16 hiking and nature trails which are well-maintained by volunteers who work under the direction of the Forest Service. The Recreation Area is located approximately 26 miles (42 km) north on Hwy. 39 heading out of Azusa, California at the headwaters of the north fork of the San Gabriel River at an elevation approximately 5,539 feet (1,688 m) above sea level. Crystal Lake is one of only two naturally occurring lakes in the San Gabriel Mountains, the other being Jackson Lake.

== History ==
The area around Crystal Lake, before there was a campground and resort, was referred to as Pine Flat. The lake was called Sycamore Lake by R. W. Dawson who lived at Sycamore Flats located down the hill from the lake. The lake has no sycamore trees, so the name was derived from Dawson's place. The area was a great draw for grizzly bears as they seemed to prefer the lake waters to the stream waters. It was a dangerous place for a human to be without a firearm of some sort. Frightful grizzly bear stories abound from the middle 1860s.

In 1887, Judge Benjamin Eaton, an early Pasadenan for whom Eaton Canyon is named, visited the pristine little lake and said, "The water is clear as crystal and the [visitors] found it good to drink." The lake soon became known as Crystal Lake.

Historic Photographs of Crystal Lake and the surrounding area from 1907 through the mid-1970s show that the campgrounds have been used by "Singing cowboys" during the era of black-and-white television, which used to feature cowboy shows. Because the campgrounds could be accessed from Angeles Crest Highway prior to the 1978 landslide, which demolished a half-mile section of California State Route 39 four miles (6 km) from Crystal Lake, Hollywood performers and other Los Angeles celebrities and politicians used to frequent the campgrounds because of the easy access across the San Gabriel Mountains.

== Climate ==
Climate data for Pattiway, California (1981–2010)
Month	Jan	Feb	Mar	Apr	May	Jun	Jul	Aug	Sep	Oct	Nov	Dec	Year
Mean daily maximum °F (°C)	48.5 (9.2)	46.3 (7.9)	50.8 (10.4)	56.6 (13.7)	64.6 (18.1)	74.0 (23.3)	80.2 (26.8)	80.7 (27.1)	75.7 (24.3)	65.5 (18.6)	54.0 (12.2)	47.8 (8.8)	62.1 (16.7)
Mean daily minimum °F (°C)	32.1 (0.1)	29.9 (−1.2)	32.5 (0.3)	38.0 (3.3)	43.4 (6.3)	52.0 (11.1)	59.4 (15.2)	60.4 (15.8)	55.1 (12.8)	46.5 (8.1)	38.9 (3.8)	32.8 (0.4)	43.4 (6.3)
Average precipitation inches (mm)	7.99 (203)	8.31 (211)	6.18 (157)	2.54 (65)	0.52 (13)	0.15 (3.8)	0.13 (3.3)	0.30 (7.6)	0.45 (11)	1.15 (29)	2.34 (59)	6.69 (170)	36.75 (932.7)
Average snowfall inches (cm)	20.8 (53)	14.0 (36)	7.6 (19)	3.6 (9.1)	0.0 (0.0)	0.0 (0.0)	0.0 (0.0)	0.0 (0.0)	0.0 (0.0)	0.6 (1.5)	1.6 (4.1)	9.2 (23)	57.4 (145.7)
Source: WRCC

== Crystal Lake ==
Crystal Lake
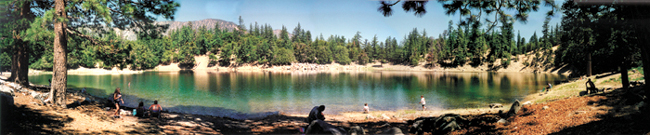

- Location within California
- Coordinates: 34°19′08″N 117°50′49″W
- Basin countries: United States
- Average depth: 10.7 m (35 ft)
- Max. depth: 45.7 m (150 ft)
- Surface elevation: 1,677 m (5,502 ft)
- References: U.S. Geological Survey Geographic Names Information System: Crystal Lake

Crystal Lake is a naturally formed sag pond, a rarity in Southern California. It is snow and spring fed and has no other artificial means of being replenished. Geographically it sits in a bed of decomposed granite. There is a fissure located at the bottom of the lake that depletes its water during and after the rain and snow season. Because of this, the lake's depths vary dramatically from a mean low of 35 feet (10.7 m) to a probable high of 150 feet (45.7 m), depending on seasonal precipitation.

The Lake is settled neatly in a bowl below the granite crags surrounding Mount Islip. In the past, the lake had amenities for picnickers, anglers, and swimmers. In 1969, a severe rainy season flooded the restrooms on the shoreline, and the water became contaminated to the point that the swimming facilities were closed. Subsequent rainy seasons flooded the small cabin that served as a summer residence for concessionaires who operated a snack stand from the lower level and patio, and by 1990 the facility was demolished.

Over the past four decades, budgeting has limited the Forest Service's ability to maintain the lake and its feeder pipeline. Then years of drought reduced the lake's water levels which continued microbiological contamination of the water, putting it off limits to any type of swimming at all.

Following a good rainy season, the lake may be stocked with fish, typically rainbow trout from the government hatcheries. Despite high or low water levels, flocks of people line the lake to fish each summer. In the past the concessionaires provided boat rentals from a small dock that was attached to cables that ran onto shore. The dock could be raised and lowered during the year with the varying levels of the water. It was removed after the 1969 rains.

As of July 2018 severe drought in California has nearly dried out Crystal Lake. It would take several years of El Nino type weather to add any significant amount of water to the lake. Swimming in the lake has been banned due to environmental and health issues involved with stagnant water.

== Campground ==
Crystal Lake Campground goes back to the 1920s as a privately leased concession until 1946 when it was permanently taken over by the U.S. Forest Service. It served as the largest campground in the Angeles National Forest, and at its height had 232 campsites. The campground is upslope from the lake about 1-mile (1.6 km) and a one-way paved road provides easy automobile access to and from the lake. There is also a foot trail that provides a gentle walk through the forest to the lake site.

The campground was always run by some sort of leased or contracted concession. The main facilities consist of a general store which grew from a small tackle house in the 1950s, to a fast food snack stand by the 1970s, rental cabins from the olden days, a residence for the concessionaires, service sheds and garages, an ice cream stand which opened in the summer, and a ranger station, which by 1990 had become a visitors center managed by forestry volunteers. Camping is $12 for first car, $5 for second, paid in a fee envelope.

Away from the main campground are located the ruins of an old dance hall. In later years as the building deteriorated, the floor was left in open air, and a small shed was put up to house a juke box. By the 1960s this was all but abandoned. Just past the old dance floor is the amphitheater where campfire programs were used to gather the campers in the evening for group sing-alongs and maybe a nature film.

Due to budget constraints, the remoteness of the area and other maintenance and logistics problems, the campground has faced closures of several camp sites reducing the number by nearly 100. In some cases the campground was completely closed. This forced the concessionaires to vacate, leaving campers and anglers no place to shop or eat if they didn't pack it in themselves. Management contractors were brought in to help run the facility, but in 2002 the Curve Fire burned through the canyons and the basin which forms the Recreation Area, prompting the campgrounds to be closed altogether for health and safety reasons.

Due to extensive fire damage to the main highway (Highway 39) Caltrans has had the highway closed while repairs have been budgeted and scheduled and currently Caltrans has been completing the repairs needed on the last remaining bridge and will be installing new safety railing along a six-mile (10 km) section of the highway that was destroyed. Caltrans and the United States Forest Service are hoping to have the highway reopened late in 2009 and concessionaires are being solicited to bid on running and maintaining the campgrounds once the Recreation Area is reopened. In March 2011, it was reopened.

== Amphitheater ==
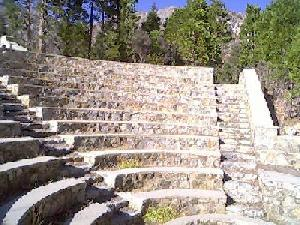
Amphitheater

One of the most interesting features of the Crystal Lake Recreation Areas is the amphitheater which was built by the Civilian Conservation Corps and other agencies and was fully restored after the damage to the facility caused by the Curve Fire of 2002 by contractors. This open facility is often used by U. S. Forest Service volunteers and employees to give lectures to individuals, Boy Scouts, hikers, campers, and picnickers during the day and often at night.

The amphitheater area is surrounded by electric lights and there are numerous electrical outlets along the walkway to the amphitheater itself. Drinking water is piped in to the facility through underground pipes fed from an underground water cistern which is in turn fed from Soldier Creek.

The theater can seat about 200 individuals and there is a central ring where large fires can be had. A drinking fountain located on the walkway to the facility provides water taken from an underground cistern fed by Soldier Creek.

Above the theater are the ruins of the large bandstand / dance floor that used to play host to Big Band Era music groups such as Benny Goodman and, on rare occasion, Elvis Presley—among many other groups. The dance floor ruins continue to crumble however there is some hope that volunteers will restore the facility so that music groups will once again play, allowing visitors to enjoy Summer music in the open air of the campgrounds.

== USFS Visitor Center ==
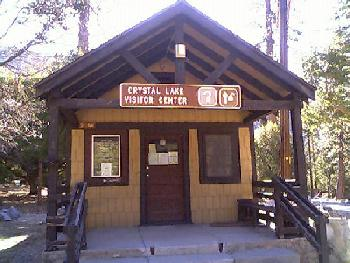
Visitor Center

The United States Forest Service maintains a Visitor Center at the campgrounds, offering printed maps of available hiking and nature trails in the area as well as offering information about any questions that visitors may have. The Visitor Center is located across the parking lot from the kitchen and general store (which is run by a private individual and not by the USFS.)

In many cases the Visitor Center will be staffed by highly knowledgeable individuals from the Angeles Volunteer Association or by other volunteers which can answer questions about the flora and fauna of the area as well as answer questions about the history of Crystal Lake.

The hours of operation are posted on the bulletin board located at the front of the Center and if the Forest Ranger or Forestry volunteer has stepped out of the Center for a period of time, a sign is provided to alert visitors of when the person is expected to return to re-open the Center. Summertime hours limited to Saturday and Sunday only.

There is no public telephone access available at the Recreation Area. The USFS employees and volunteers have radio communications capabilities with medical assistance, rescue, law enforcement, and other agencies in the event a visitor requires assistance, however the Visitor Center hours of operation are limited to weekends and some holidays, and emergency assistance may not always be available.

There is drinking water located at many of the camp sites within the campground system, however there is also water available at the Visitor Center and the Cafe.

The Visitor Center can be reached by telephone at (626) 910-1149 Saturdays and Sundays between the hours of 8:00 AM to 4:00 PM.

== Cafe and store ==
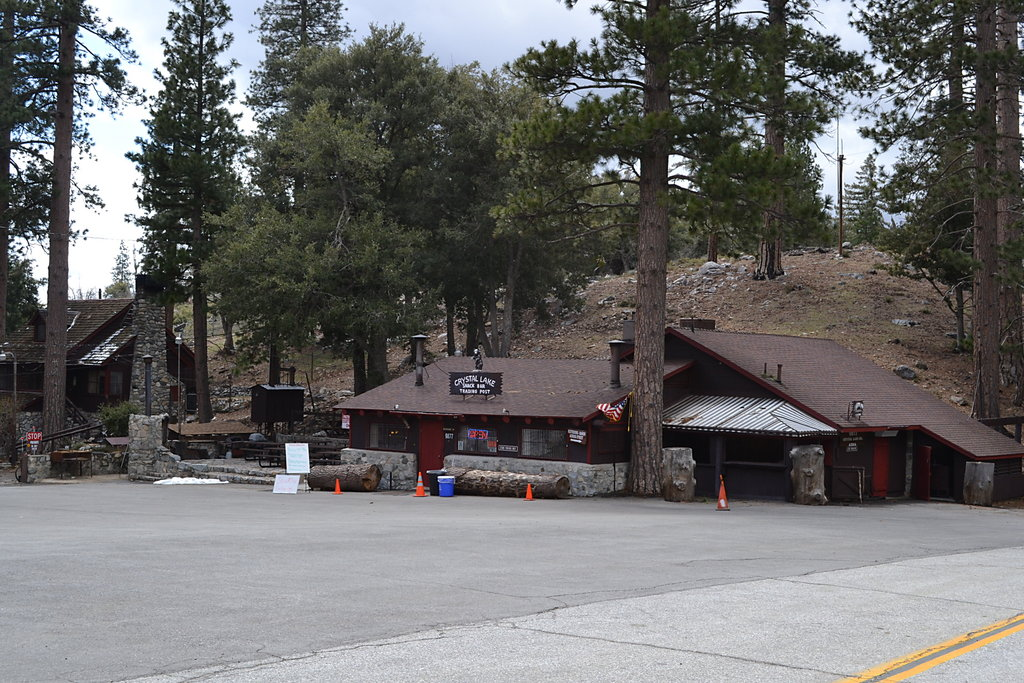
Snack bar, store and kitchen

There is a cafe that features a potbelly stove and an open patio with a number of tables next to an array of gas and charcoal grills for outdoor cooking. The cafe opens at dawn and closes after dark all days of the week except for Tuesdays when the cafe is closed.

There are menus posted inside the cafe with specials listed on post boards outside of the cafe. Drinking water is available at a faucet outside the cafe, and trash bags are handed out to people to collect trash. The cafe has an ongoing policy that if you fill a trash bag and bring it back to them, the cafe will give you a free brownie or cup of coffee to encourage people to collect, bag, and dispose of litter. The cafe also provides plastic buckets for visitors to use to extinguish their camp fires with.

The cafe's telephone number is (626) 910-1029. Cabin rentals can be acquired through using that telephone number.

== Hiking and nature trails ==
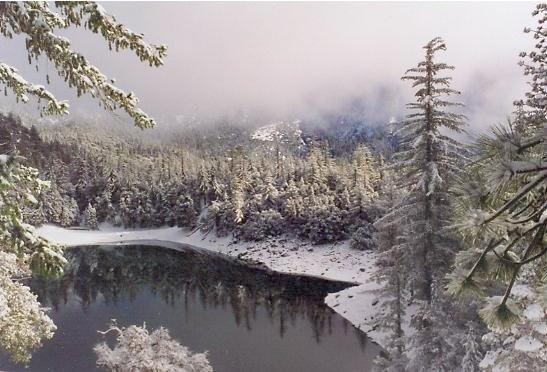
Crystal Lake in Winter

As a recreation area the campground had many nature trails for visitors which provided scenic and educational walks through various parts of the canyon: Pinion Ridge, Soldier Creek, Knob Hill, Golden Cup, Tototgna to name a few. The Lake Trail provides a one-mile (1.6 km) walk to the lake. The Windy Gap Trail ascends the south slope of Mount Hawkins to the saddle between Hawkins and Mount Islip, known as "Windy Gap", where it connects to the Pacific Crest Trail.

- Half Knob Trail : 34°19′26″N 117°50′12″W —This is a short hike trail which begins and ends at points along the main paved roadway leading to the Visitor Center. The trailhead is located at North 34 degrees, 19.444 by West 117 degrees, 50.210 at 5,717 feet (1,743 m).
- Lake Trail : 34°19′24″N 117°50′15″W —The trail cuts across the camp grounds and joins the main road that heads up to the Visit Center to Lake Road. The start of the trail head from the main road end is located at North 34 degrees, 19.410 by West 117 degrees, 50.261 at 5,744 feet (1,751 m).
- Golden Cup Nature Trail : 34°19′38″N 117°50′06″W —This is a short hike with four or five information boards placed along the trail. The trail itself forms a loop such that the start and end of the hike is near a main paved road. The trail head is located at North 34 degrees, 19.630 by West 117 degrees, 50.108 at 5,865 feet (1,788 m).
- Big Cieneca Trail : 34°20′07″N 117°49′31″W —This trail is 1.2 miles (1.9 km) long and has its start at a paved road.
- Windy Gap : 34°19′37″N 117°49′56″W —This trail is 2.5 miles (4.0 km) long and has its start at a paved road. The trailhead is located at North 34 degrees, 19.890 by West 117 degrees, 50.021 at 6,099 feet (1,859 m).
- Access to Pacific Crest Trail : 34°19′52″N 117°49′59″W —This trail is 2.5 miles (4.0 km) long and has its start at a paved road.
- Little Jimmy Trail Camp : 34°20′51″N 117°49′47″W —This trail is 2.8 miles (4.5 km) long and has its start at a paved road.
- Mount Hawkins Trail : 34°20′02″N 117°50′11″W —This trail is 4.8 miles (7.7 km) long and has its start at a paved road. The trail actually swings around the camp grounds and passes through a heliport (above the destroyed fire watch tower) and then ends at South Mt. Hawkins lookout (which burned to the ground in the 2002 Curve Fire.)
- Pinyon Ridge : 34°19′21″N 117°49′58″W —This is a moderately long trail which forms a loop that takes hikers up the side of the mountain ridge, along the ridge, and then back down again, curving around to form the loop. There is water present at three places along the trail all year, and the start of the trail requires about an hour's worth of effort to remove new growth. The trail head location is the same as the start of Soldier Creek: North 34 degrees, 19.354 by West 117 degrees, 49.976 at 5,656 feet (1,724 m).
- Soldier Creek Trail : 34°19′21″N 117°49′58″W —Fire damage and flooding has effectively destroyed this trail and it is currently extremely dangerous to hike along. This is a long hiking trail and without a doubt the best hiking trail in the Crystal Lake Recreation Area. It follows Soldier Creek which contains good, high-volume water, sporting rare vegetation such as Catalina Cherries. This trail may or may not be restored prior to the Crystal Lake Camp Grounds being opened. The trail head location is the same as the start of Pinyon Ridge trail: North 34 degrees, 19.354 by West 117 degrees, 49.976 at 5,656 feet (1,724 m).
- Lost Ridge Trail : 34°19′27″N 117°50′34″W (lower) : 34°19′27″N 117°50′22″W (upper)—This trail is a long one with one end of the trail head up near Deer Flats and the other end on Lake Road. To increase safety, the Trailbuilder crew installed steps in a number of places and the volunteers may decide to install more steps in moderately steep places in the future. The lake road trail head is located at North 34 degrees, 19.452 by West 117 degrees, 50.463 at 5,728 feet (1,746 m). The other end of the trail is in the Deer Flats Campgrounds and it is located at North 34 degrees, 19.977 by West 117 degrees, 50.365 at 6,344 feet (1,934 m).
- Tototngna Nature Trail : 34°19′32″N 117°49′46″W —This trail was recently worked on (06/Jul/13) and is fully developed from end to end. This is a moderately long trail which forms a loop and can be accessed from a paved road. The trail head is located at North 34 degrees, 19.538 by West 117 degrees, 49.767 at 5,929 feet (1,807 m). Tototngna is rather special in that the trail crosses moist meadow areas and in the Spring boasts flora that is not usually seen anywhere else within the Recreation Area.
- Cedar Canyon Trail : 34°19′21″N 117°50′16″W —This trail has its start on the main road leading up to the Visitor Center. It's a moderately long trail that leads to a good volume of water. The trail actually meets up with Soldier Creek Trail which requires extensive repairs before the trail is safe and usable. The trail head for this end of the trail is located at North 34 degrees, 19.366 by West 117 degrees, 50.280 at 5,820 feet (1,770 m).
- Sunset Ridge Nature Trail : 34°20′00″N 117°50′14″W —This trail is located inside of the Deer Flats Campgrounds. It's a short trail which forms a loop that ends about 30 feet (9.1 m) from where it begins. The trail is currently being restored and about 20% of the trail has been completed. The location of this trail is at North 34 degrees, 20.002 by West 117 degrees, 50.249 at 6,423 feet (1,958 m).
- Islip Ridge Trail (a.k.a. Wawona Trail) : 34°19′07″N 117°50′41″W —This trail is located at the parking lot for the lake itself with a trailhead sign located approximately 100 feet (30 m) from the actual parking lot. The trail climbs an additional 2,200 feet (670 m) through approximately 7.2 miles (11.6 km) eventually reaching Angeles Crest Highway with access to Windy Gap, Little Jimmy, and other trails. Mile 1.65 is located approximately at North 34 degrees 19.292 by West 117 degrees, 51.066 at 6,293 feet (1,918 m).
- Mount Islip Trail : 34°20′36″N 117°49′44″W (Windy Gap Saddle) 34°20′10″N 117°50′44″W (Wawona Islip Junction) —This trail can be accessed either from Wawona Trail or from Windy Gap Saddle. The trail connects Mount Islip to the Recreation Area through Southbound hikes using wither Windy Gap Trail or Wawona / Islip Trail.
- Hawkins Ridge Trail : 34°20′36″N 117°48′17″W (Pacific Crest Trail junction) 34°18′56″N 117°48′34″W (Mount Hawkins Road Junction) —This trail can be reached off of the Pacific Crest Trail East of Windy Gap Saddle, or it can be reached by taking Mount Hawkins Road (which is abandoned but usable on foot and mountain bike.) The trail was last maintained across its full length in May 2016. The trail signs at the Northern end along the Pacific Crest Trail is missing as of July 2018.
- Trail from Windy Gap Saddle to Little Jimmy Trail Camp
- Trail from Windy Gap Saddle to Baden-Powell summit

== Trail maintenance ==
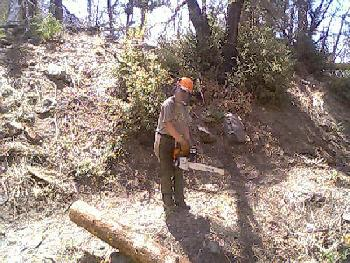
San Gabriel Mountains Trailbuilders

The hiking and nature trails located within the Crystal Lake Recreation Area as well as within the surrounding San Gabriel River Ranger District of the United States Forest Service are restored, repaired, and maintained by the San Gabriel Mountains Trailbuilders which brings in and coordinates other volunteers from Southern California and surrounding States.

The tax exempt volunteer Trailbuilders organization works closely with the USFS to perform maintenance on the trails in the region even when the region is periodically closed to the general public so that once the region is re-opened the trails are constantly in a reasonably safe condition for hikers to use.

Most of the hiking trails receive maintenance according to the availability of volunteers, weather, and other factors however some trails require a two-day restoration effort and as such require an overnight stay which makes maintenance performed on those trails less frequent.

The maintenance of trails within the Crystal Lake campgrounds consists mostly of repairing the tread upon which hikers walk, removing accumulated rocks, sand, and gravel, and reworking the tread to provide a gentle slope from which rain water can flow off the side of the trail (rather than down the trail which causes erosion and a difficult, uncomfortable hike).

For some of the nature trails—such as Golden Cup and Lake Trail—maintenance and repair has consisted of volunteers hauling in many thousands of pounds of rock, gravel, and sand using buckets to fill in sections of the trails which have been damaged by rainfall. When such efforts are performed, surveys of the lay of the trail and the surrounding land is performed to design rain water runoff schemes so that future rains won't damage the repair work which is being performed.

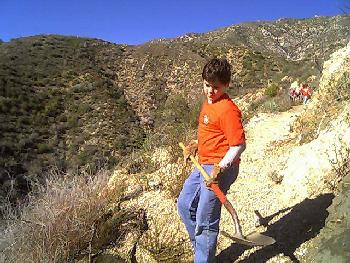
Volunteer worker

For most of the trails bark beetle infestation of pine trees has killed many trees, and the Curve Fire of 2002 also destroyed many trees along some of the most popular trails—such as Windy Gap, Soldier Creek, and Sunset Ridge. Trail restoration, repair, and maintenance for such areas consists of bucking up fallen trees with chainsaws or crosscut saws as needed and hauling the bucked up sections of the trees off of the trail.

In some instances where hanging safety hazards exists, proactive maintenance is performed by safely pulling dead and hanging trees and tree limbs down to the ground where the hazards can be bucked up and removed.

Less frequent repairs and maintenance involves the building of rock retaining walls to hold back rock and dirt slides which can flood sections of the campground's hiking trails. Additionally rock walkways across gullies are built to afford safer hiking across otherwise unsafe sections of trails.

The San Gabriel Mountains Trailbuilders provide the tools, equipment and planning required for maintenance of the trails, soliciting and coordinating additional volunteers from organizations such as Buddhist Youth Groups, Boy Scouts of America, church groups, hiking, biking, and climbing clubs, High School students, and court-ordered Community Service individuals.

Trail maintenance in the Crystal Lake Recreation Area is conducted on an ongoing basis by volunteers, who maintain a network of hiking trails within the campgrounds area.

== Reporting trail and other problems ==
As of July 2018, obstructions, erosion, and other problems with hiking trails and nature trails located within the Recreation Area may be reported to the San Gabriel Mountains Trailbuilders web page created specifically to inform work crews of the need for maintenance. GPS coordinates of problems as well as photographs are helpful in coordinating trail repairs within the Recreation Area, so the trail crews appreciate as much information as visitors can provide.

Other Recreation Area problems such as spray paint vandalism, leaking water outlets, overflowing camp sites or BBQ boxes may also be reported to the Trailbuilders as well as to the U. S. Forest Service Glendora, California offices at (626) 335-1251, Monday through Friday from 8:00am to 4:30pm.

== Deer Flats ==
Deer Flats is a group campground about one mile (1600 m) up the South Hawkins Road from the main campground. It has nine sites for groups of eight to fourteen. It provides an even more remote location for Scouting, church groups, retreats, etc. It too has been affected by the closing.

The Group Campgrounds generally require a permit from the San Gabriel River Ranger District's offices before groups may utilize the group campgrounds. This is because individuals are encouraged to use the smaller camp sites located in the main grounds so that large groups may utilize the larger camp sites.

Deer Flats Group Campground contains 25 very large camp sites, most of them with four large fire rings, many of them with concrete-and-stone ovens, and most of them with at least two large concrete tables upon which campers may cook and have picnics. Because Deer Flats is intended for large groups, downed trees are situated around the larger fire rings in most of the camp sites for seating.

There is drinking water at Deer Flats, fed from water taken from a large water tank located at the Northern edge of the campgrounds. Water is distributed to the camp sites through a system of underground pipes, through a number of distribution valves and boxes, and then to individual drinking and outflow facilities located around the campgrounds.

There are several toilet buildings located toward the Southern end of Deer Flats Group Campgrounds which have been installed after the Curve Fire swept through the area. The existing older stone toilet facilities are currently closed and will likely remain closed in favor of the newer, more environmentally friendly toilet facilities.

== Postal address and street address ==
- Post Office Box: Crystal Lake Snack Bar And Store. Post Office Box 1335. Azusa, CA 91702
- Street address: 9877 N Crystal Lake Rd, Azusa, CA 91702
