= Jane W. Bruner =

American author, painter, musician, and anti-Catholic activist (1845–1909)

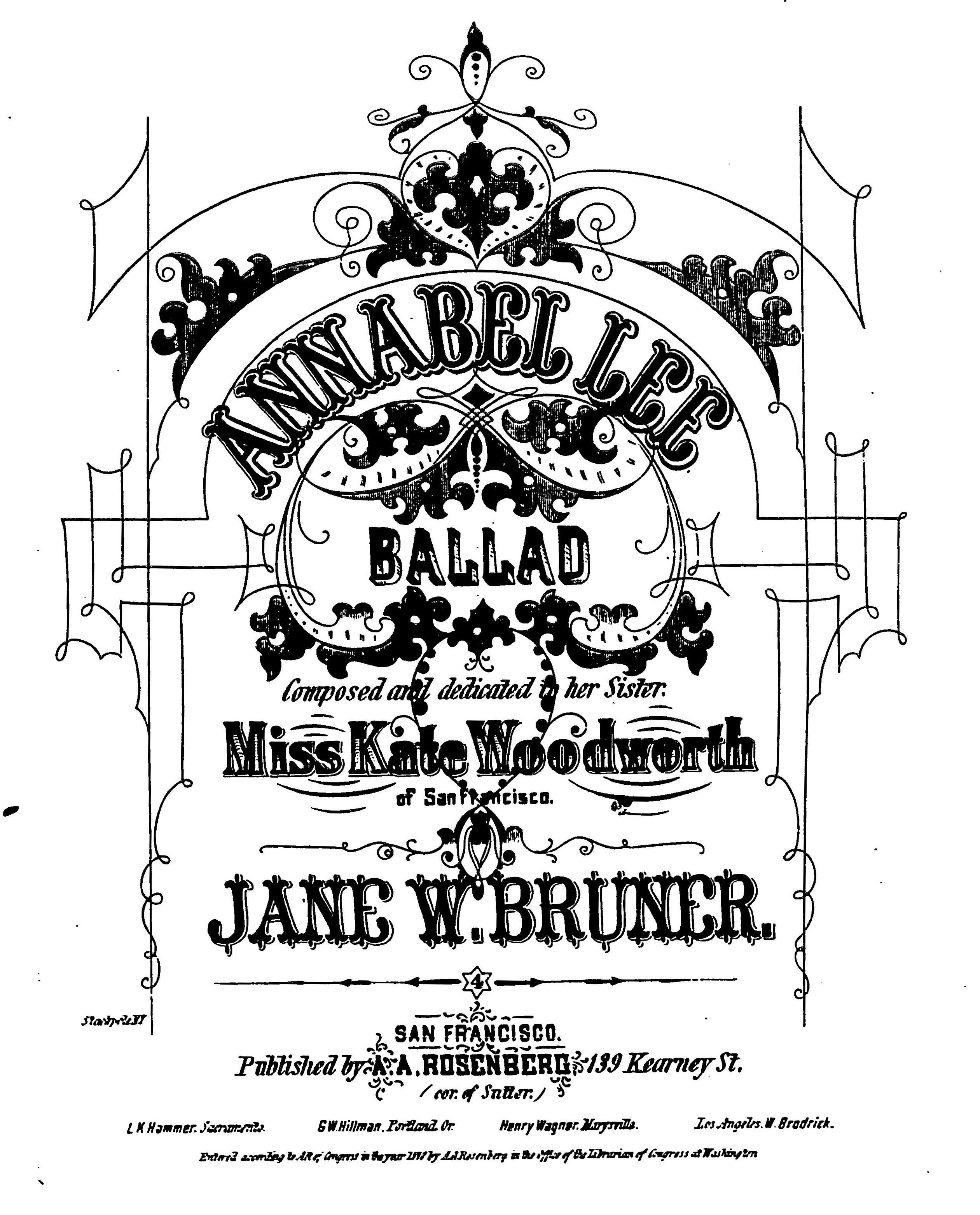
- Bruner's sheet music to "Annabel Lee"
- Born: 1845
- Died: July 20, 1909; Long Beach
- Occupation: Writer

Jane Woodworth Bruner (1845 – July 20, 1909) was an American author, painter, musician, and anti-Catholic activist.

Bruner was a native of Chester County, Pennsylvania. She was the daughter of California mining magnate Joseph "Ophir" Woodworth. She married and later divorced Dr. William H. Bruner.

Bruner was a frequent contributor to Overland Monthly. She set Edgar Allan Poe's poem "Annabel Lee" to music, publishing the sheet music in 1870. She wrote a novel set in Grass Valley, California, Free Prisoners: A Story of California (1877).

Her play A Mad World (1883) premiered at Baldwin's Theatre in San Francisco. She befriended Mark Twain when he had lived in California and wrote to Twain asking him to attend the play in New Haven, Connecticut.

Bruner was an anti-Catholic lecturer and published an anti-Catholic tract, The Question of Romanism (1908).

Bruner died on 20 July 1909 in Long Beach, California.
