= Lucky Baldwin =

American businessman and racehorse breeder

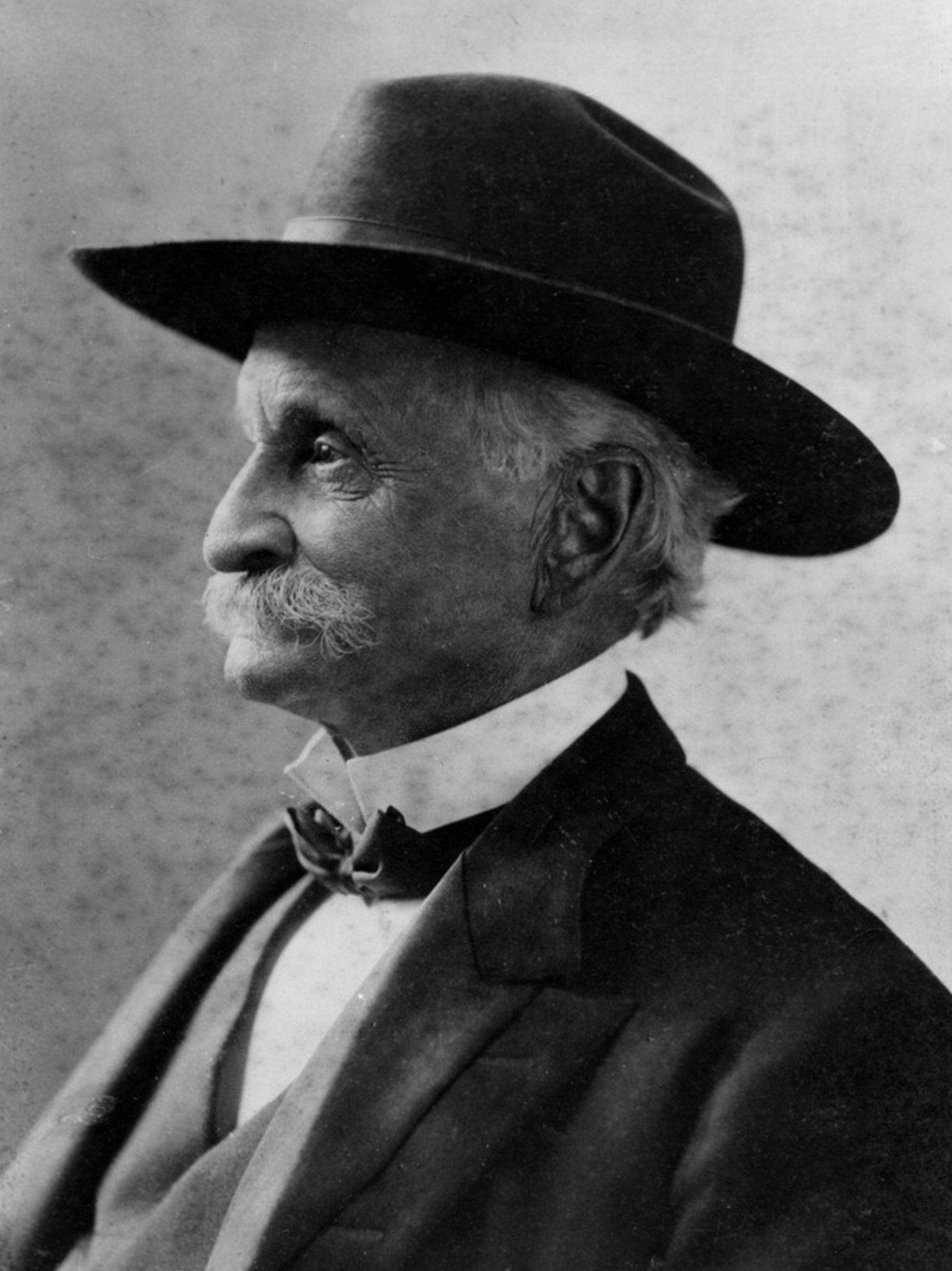
- Lucky Baldwin in 1905
- Born: April 3, 1828; Hamilton, Ohio, US
- Died: March 1, 1909 (aged 80); Arcadia, California, US
- Occupations: Businessman; investor; racehorse owner/breeder
- Board member of: Pacific Stock Exchange, Baldwin Hotel, Santa Anita Park, Baldwin Theater, Tallac Hotel & Casino
- Spouses: Sarah Ann Unruh (divorced); Mary Cochrane (divorced); Jennie Dexter (died); Lillie Bennett (sep.)
- Children: 3 with Unruh; 1 with Dexter
- Honors: Baldwin Hills, Los Angeles, California; Baldwin Park, California; Baldwin Stakes at Santa Anita Park; National Museum of Racing and Hall of Fame Pillar of the Turf (2018)

Elias Jackson "Lucky" Baldwin (April 3, 1828 – March 1, 1909) was "one of the greatest pioneers" of California business, an investor, and real estate speculator during the second half of the 19th century. He earned the nickname "Lucky" Baldwin due to his extraordinary good fortune in a number of business deals. He built the luxury Baldwin Hotel and Theatre in San Francisco and bought vast tracts of land in Southern California, where a number of places and neighborhoods are named after him.

== Early life ==
Baldwin was born in Hamilton, Ohio, in 1828, the fourth of 14 children. The family moved to a farm in Indiana in 1834, when he was 6. Throughout his childhood he was known as a wanderer and adventurer. Baldwin received little formal education but was known as a strong-willed, independent individual. At age 18, he eloped with a neighbor girl named Sarah Ann Unruh and returned home to farm and train horses. He and his wife looked for more prosperous way to make a living and they moved to Valparaiso, Indiana, where they opened a saloon and grocery store. They soon added grain trading and a venture with canal boats to their businesses. Their first daughter, Clara, was born in Valparaiso.

== Move to California ==
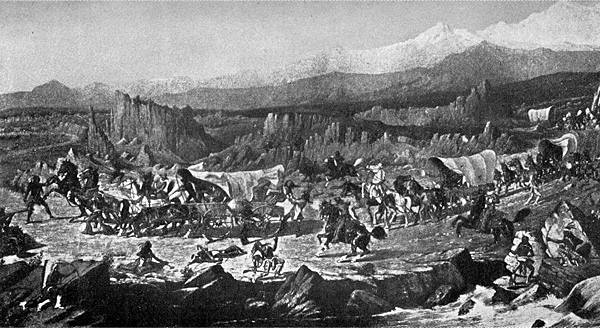
Indian attack on the Baldwin Party near Salt Lake City in 1853, as pictured by the artist Cross, from Lucky Baldwin's description. Image from C.B. Glasscock's 1933 biography Lucky Baldwin: The Story of an Unconventional Success.

In 1853, at the height of the California Gold Rush, he decided to relocate to California. An already successful businessman, he decided his future wealth lay in providing food, supplies and accommodations, and not digging for gold. He sold the businesses in Valparaiso and used the profits to purchase wagons and supplies for a trip west.

Before he left Racine, Wisconsin, with his wife and six-year-old daughter, he equipped four wagons and loaded two of them with tobacco, brandy, and tea. He hired men to drive the other wagons. They joined a large wagon train in Council Bluffs, Iowa. During the five-month trek west, Baldwin scouted ahead and got lost, and was only saved from starvation by friendly Native Americans who took him back to the wagon train.

Outside Salt Lake City, his caravan was attacked by less friendly Native Americans and Baldwin barely escaped with his life. In Salt Lake City, home to the Mormons, he sold the bulk of his brandy to the brother of Brigham Young at $16.00 a gallon. He also sold the tobacco and tea and used the profits to buy horses. The family arrived in Hangtown (later known as Placerville) barefoot and worn out. Baldwin sold the horses upon arriving in Sacramento at a 400% profit.

=== Business ventures ===
Baldwin arrived in San Francisco in 1853. Baldwin and his wife Sarah had more than doubled their capital while crossing the country. He immediately bought the Temperance Hotel on Pacific Avenue near Battery Street with $5,000 cash which he sold only 30 days later for a $5,000 profit. He was active in the lively real estate market, bought a livery, bought and sold goods, and invested in the stock market, becoming a key player in the San Francisco Stock Exchange.

He later started a brick-manufacturing plant at Powell and Union Streets, producing building materials that were used to construct the U.S. Mint, Fort Point and the fort on Alcatraz Island.

Sarah Baldwin lost two infants and in 1862, the Baldwins divorced. During 1875–76, he built the opulent Baldwin Hotel and Theater, located on Powell Street at the corner of Market Street, near the Union Square area. He was rescued from his rooms when the entire building was destroyed by fire in 1898.

=== Invests in mine stock ===
When the great Comstock Lode was discovered in Nevada in 1859, he arrived with a load of timber, which he sold and then bought a livery. He made money on several ventures. In payment for a debt, he received 2,000 shares of the Ophir Mine, which was then worth a few cents a share. Using his profits, he slowly invested in several mines: the Hale & Norcross, Ophir and Crown Point at the north end of the Comstock Lode (the Crown Point was actually at the southern, in Gold Hill). While in Nevada, he met a group of British sportsmen who invited him to join them in India on a big game safari. Baldwin sold the livery and prepared to leave for India.

In another stroke of good fortune that cemented his reputation as "Lucky" Baldwin, he left instructions with his broker to sell his Norcross stock if it fell below $800 a foot. (Veins of gold and silver were often sold at the time by the foot.) Baldwin met a troupe of Japanese entertainers in Tokyo and brought them to New York, where he became a vaudeville producer. Upon returning to San Francisco, he learned that his stocks had indeed fallen below the threshold sales price he specified, but his broker had been unable to sell because Baldwin had taken the key to the safe holding the stock certificates. In an incredible stroke of good fortune, the stock price had rebounded to a spectacular level, creating a multimillion-dollar profit for Baldwin. Using new-found wealth, estimated to be about $2.5 million (equivalent to $90,000,000 in 2025), he branched out in his investments.

=== Landowner ===
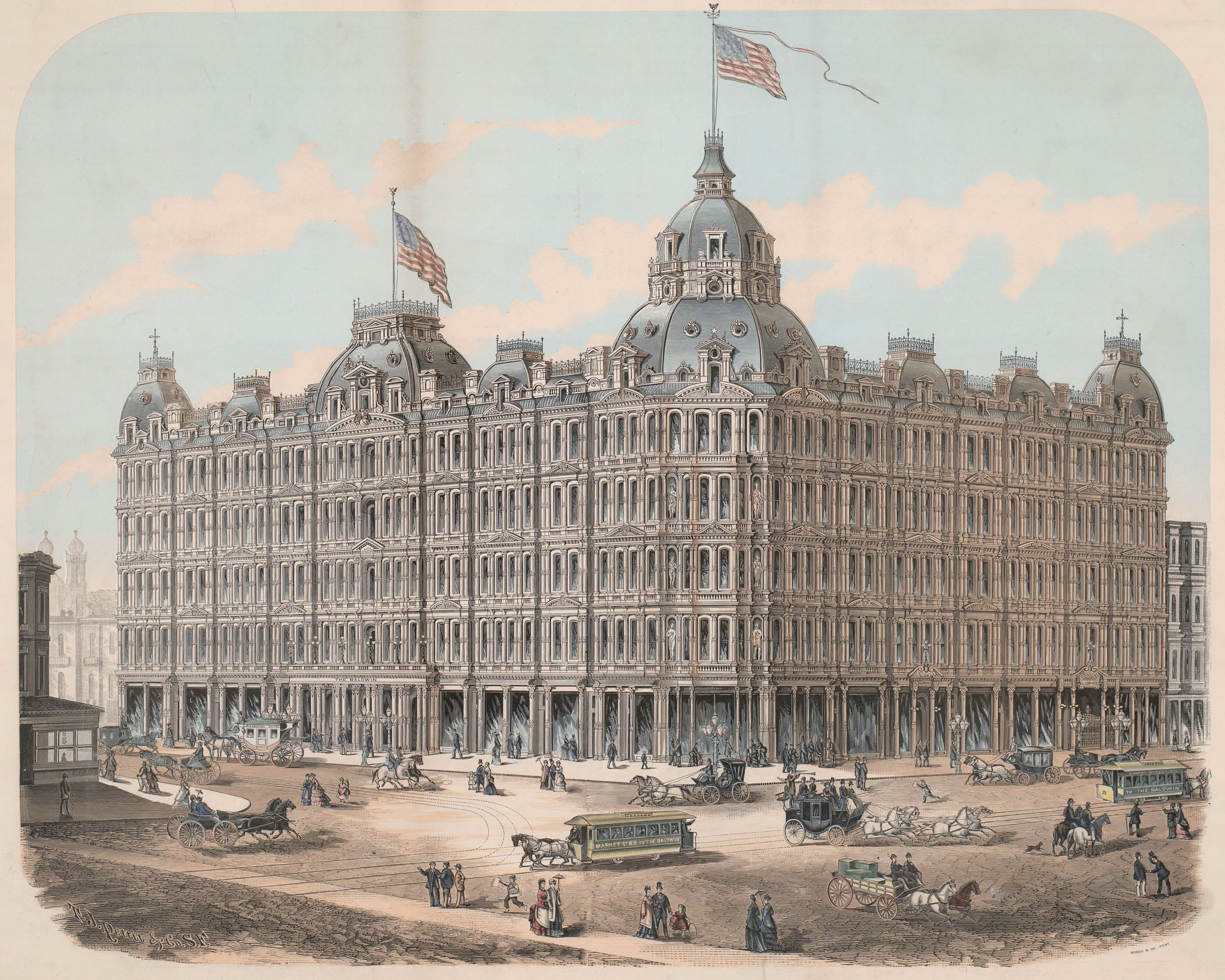
Baldwin's Hotel and Theatre (built in 1876, burned down in 1898)

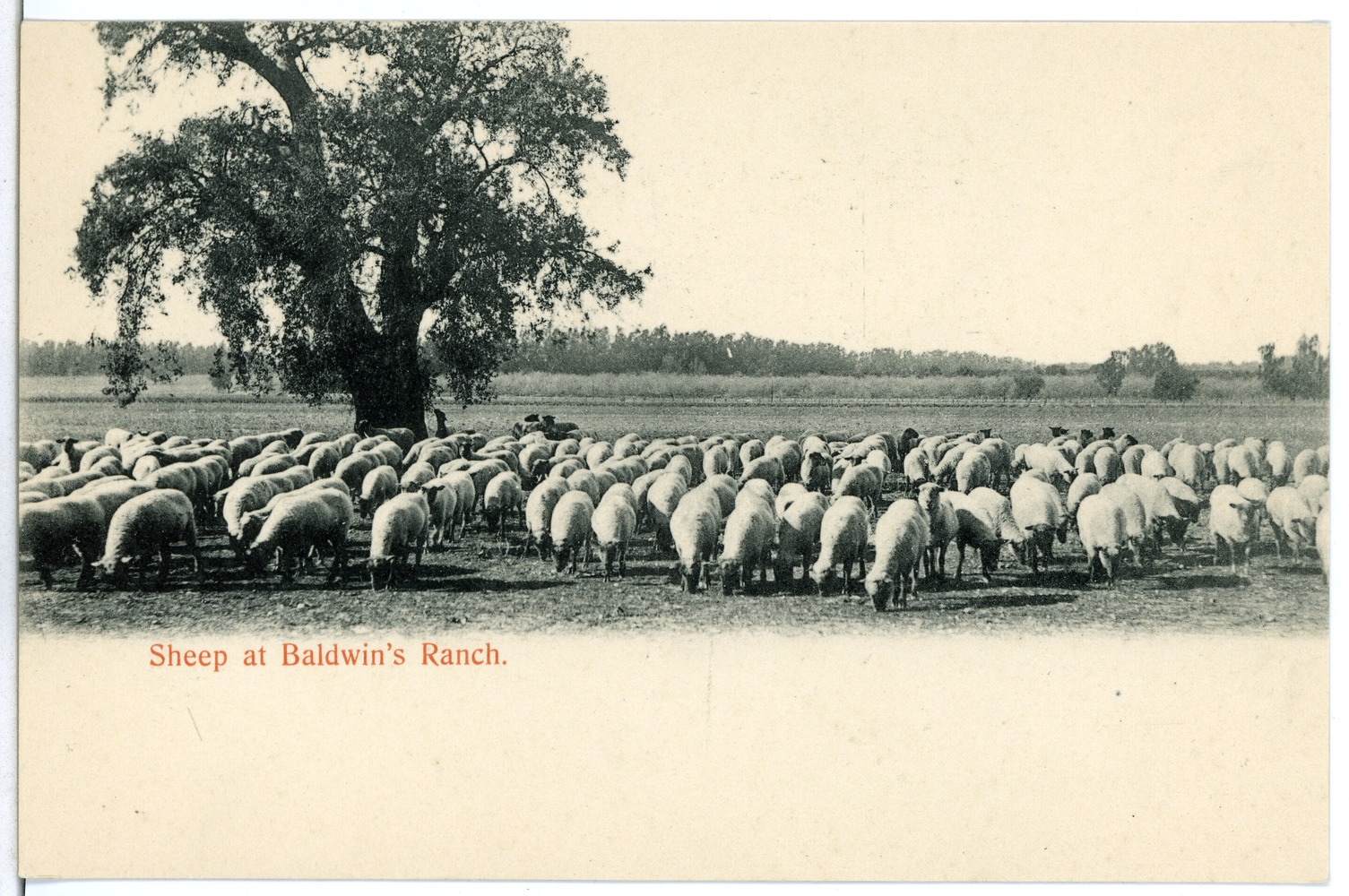
Sheep at Baldwins Ranch (1903)

With the wealth generated through both his savvy and lucky investments, he was able to survive stock market crashes and bank failures. In 1875–76, he built the Baldwin Theater and Hotel ("the finest west of New York") which earned him headlines across the United States.

During the summer of 1879, Baldwin was in South Lake Tahoe and spent time at a small hotel owned by Ephraim "Yank" Clements situated on 2,000 acres (810 ha) and with rights to an entire mile of lakefront shoreline. The resort was unusual because it still retained the majestic old-growth forests that had been harvested throughout much of the basin for beams to support silver mine tunnels in the Comstock Lode. In 1880, Baldwin bought the resort when it went into foreclosure. Baldwin re-christened the property the "Tallac House" after nearby 9,785 feet (2,982 m) Mount Tallac, one of the tallest mountains in the Lake Tahoe basin. His resort soon attracted travelers from across the United States seeking luxury accommodations.

He divorced his wife Sarah and in 1875, Baldwin moved to Southern California and bought the Rancho Santa Anita in the fertile San Gabriel Valley from Harris Newmark. Baldwin offered $150,000, but Newmark wanted $200,000. Baldwin at first refused to pay the premium price, but his lawyer Reuben Lloyd told him he should buy it before the price rose further. Baldwin met with Newmark again, carrying a tin-box containing several million dollars, and withdrew $12,500 cash from it as a first payment. Baldwin invested in the Temple and Workman Bank, and when it failed, he acquired even more land through default. Baldwin eventually bought over 63,000 acres (25,495 ha) of land. Baldwin made additions to the Hugo Reid Adobe house by Lake. In 1940 the home became a California Historic Landmark.

When people began moving to Southern California in large numbers during the 1880s, Baldwin subdivided some of his land, creating the towns of Arcadia and Monrovia, California. A portion of his La Cienega Rancho became the community of Baldwin Hills. The city of Sierra Madre is now located on land he once owned.

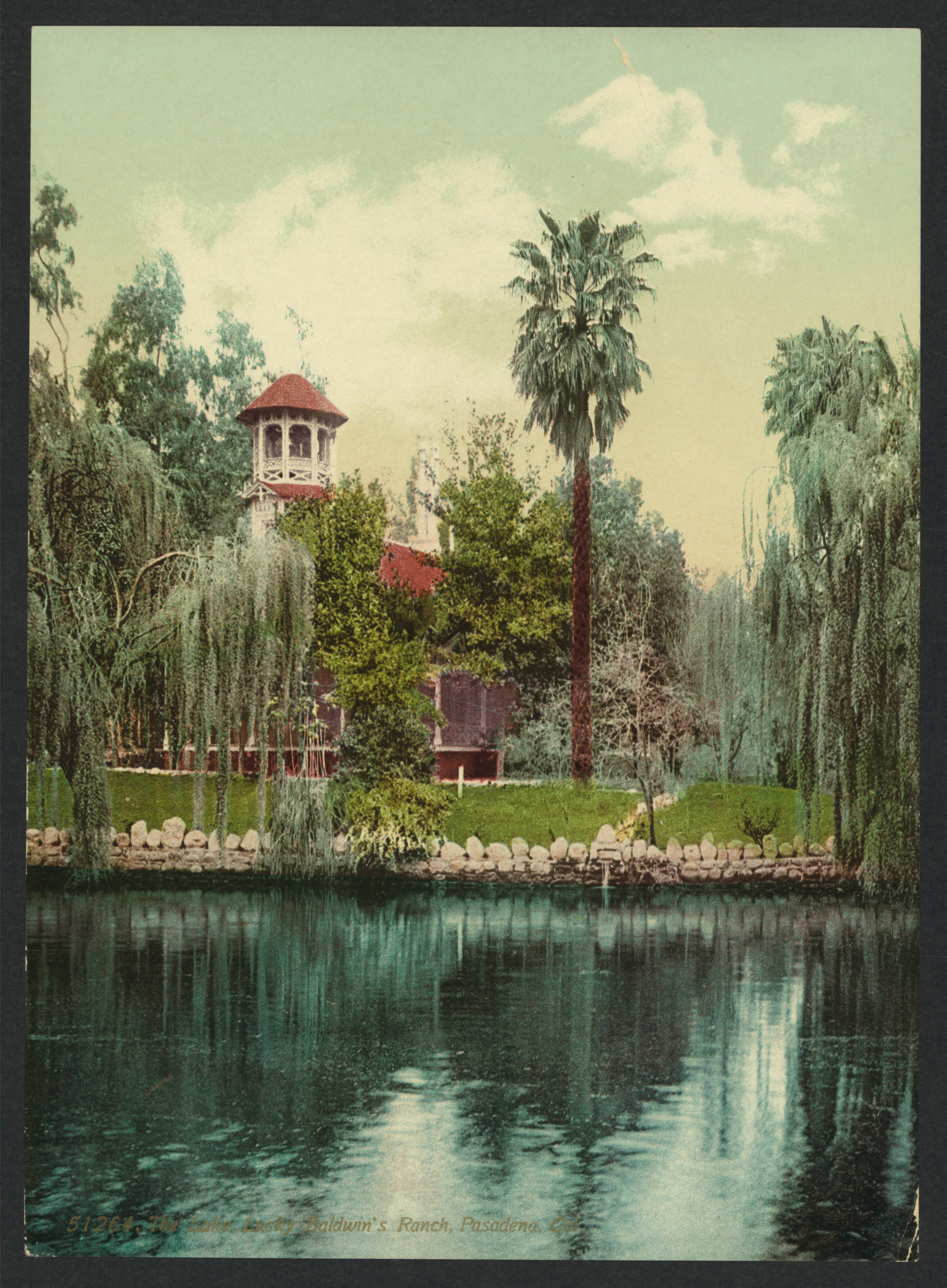
The lake, Lucky Baldwin's ranch, Pasadena taken between 1898 and 1905

A visitor to Santa Anita in 1886 wrote: "The ranch is a principality not unlike a Southern plantation before the [Civil] [W]ar, save that all the laborers are well-paid and well fed." He was the largest employer and the largest taxpayer in Los Angeles County at the time.

=== Fair employer ===
At a time of open discrimination and racism in American society, he provided many jobs to Chinese, African-American and Native American workers. He told a reporter that "Chinese are the most reliable laborers I can get." He made news when he hired African-Americans from North Carolina and paid for their train tickets to California. However, ranch workers of all backgrounds were paid only a pittance.

== Lifestyle ==
Baldwin was financially tightfisted in his business dealings, but led a flamboyant lifestyle. He was especially free-spending when it came to women. One contemporary commented, "Baldwin didn't run after women; they ran after him."

Baldwin's matrimonial ventures periodically created sensations. He was married four times, the first two marriages ending in divorce. His third wife, Jennie Dexter, was 16 at the time of marriage. She died of tuberculosis at the age of 23, leaving him with a five-year-old daughter. Baldwin remarried a 16-year-old dark-haired, dark-eyed girl called Lillie Bennett who had a striking resemblance to Jennie. The Queen Anne Cottage was built as a honeymoon present by Lillie's father. They separated after less than two years but never divorced. He reportedly had many affairs with young women in his older years. He was sued by four women for breach of promise of marriage. His stature as a celebrity was such that at age 56, when he married Bennett in San Francisco, the wedding drew coast-to-coast press coverage. In the same year, he was sued by a jilted 16-year-old girl who was awarded $75,000 in damages.

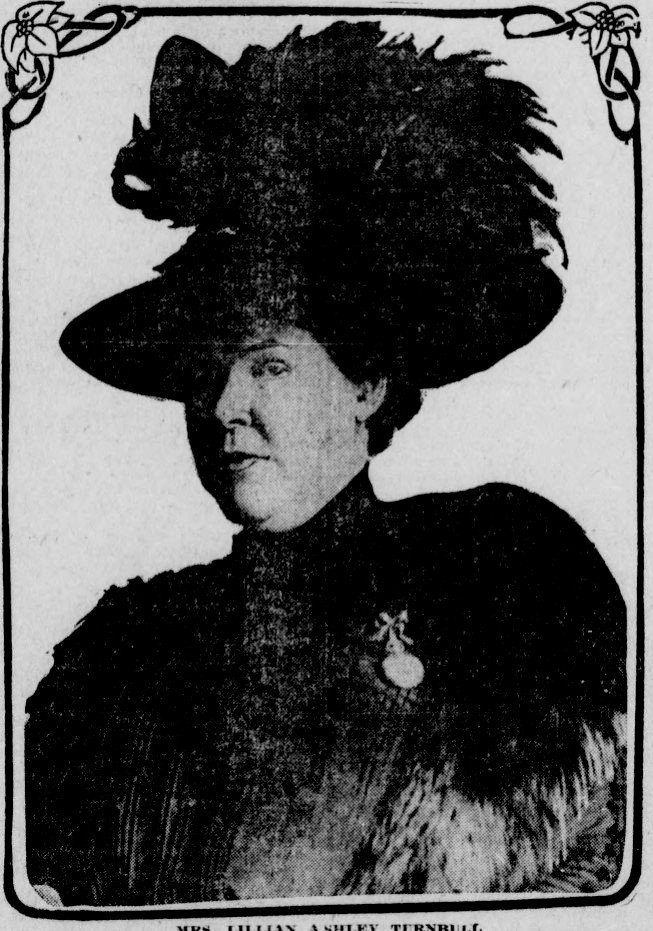
Lillian Ashley (later Turnbull) signed a "wedding contract" with Lucky Baldwin. Los Angeles Herald

One woman remembered for accusing him of breach of promise shot and wounded him in 1883 with a pistol inside his luxury Baldwin Hotel, built in 1876 on the northeast corner of Powell and Market St. The woman's name was Fannie Verona Baldwin, a native of Olympia in what was then Washington Territory. Verona herself stated it was not a case of seduction, however, but of rape. He also narrowly escaped death in a San Francisco courtroom on July 2, 1896. He was sued by Lillian Ashley for seduction. While she was on the witness stand, her sister Emma Ashley, walked up behind Baldwin and fired a pistol at him, grazing his skull.

== Thoroughbred racing ==
Baldwin bred and raced a number of top Thoroughbred racehorses. He raced under the nom de course "Santa Anita Stable". One of his best filly runners, Los Angeles, competed at tracks on the East Coast of the United States where she won the 1887 Tyro and Spinaway Stakes plus the 1888 Monmouth Oaks and Latonia Derby. Among other successes, Baldwin's horses won the American Derby at the now defunct Washington Park Race Track four times: Volante (1885); Silver Cloud (1886); Emperor of Norfolk (1888); and Rey el Santa Anita (1894).

Wyatt Earp, a long-time admirer of fine horse breeding, frequented the race track when he and his wife Josephine were in Los Angeles. Josephine wrote in I Married Wyatt Earp that she and Wyatt were married in 1892 by the captain aboard Baldwin's yacht. Raymond Nez wrote that his grandparents witnessed their marriage aboard a yacht off the California coast. No public record of their marriage has ever been found.

In 2018, Lucky Baldwin was voted into the National Museum of Racing and Hall of Fame as one of its esteemed Pillars of the Turf.

== Death and legacy ==
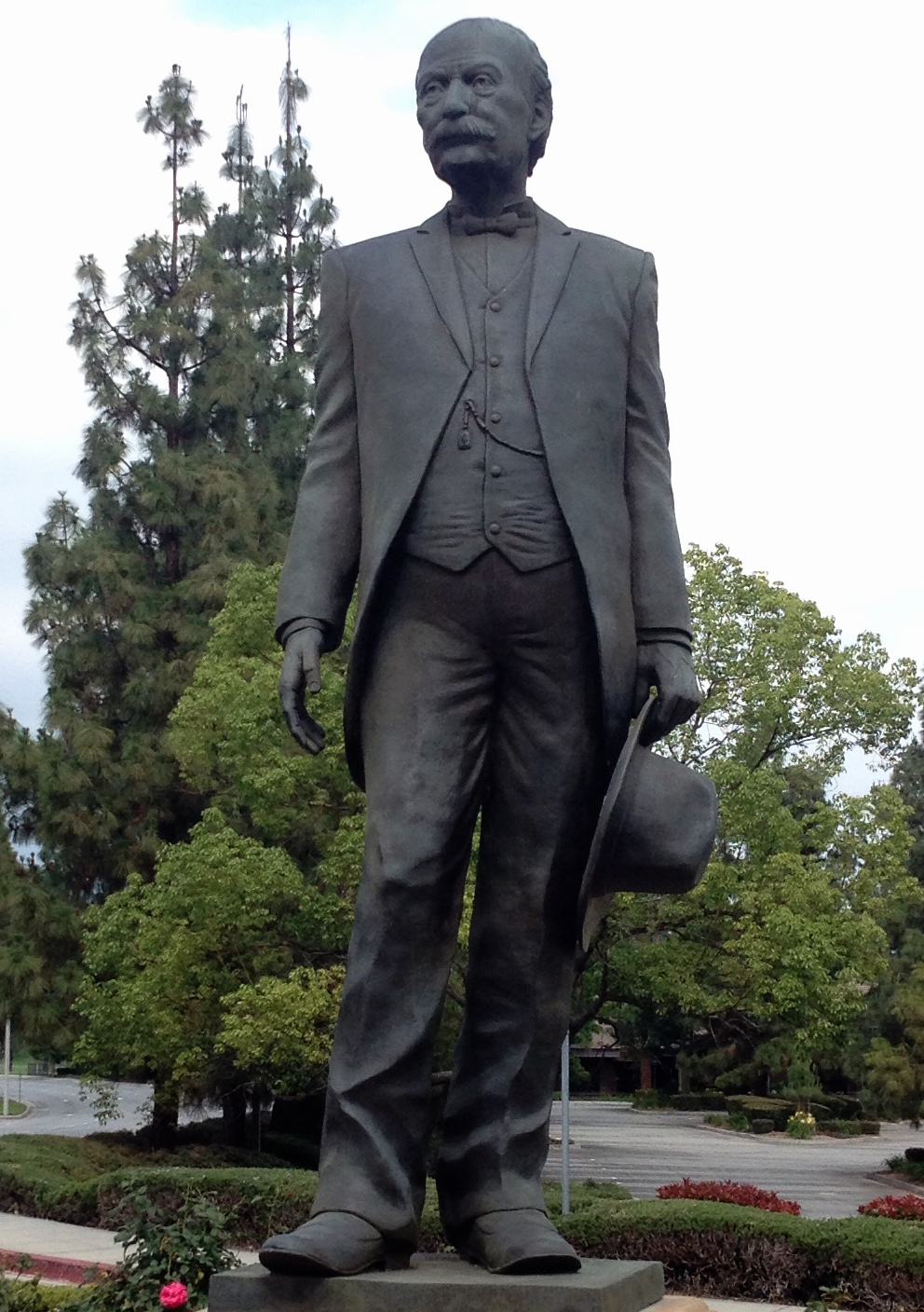
A Dawn in the West (a statue of Lucky Baldwin), in Arcadia, California

During the 1890s, his wealth diminished, but Baldwin maintained an interest in horse racing and poker. His wife Lillie and his daughters Anita Baldwin McClaughry and Clara Baldwin Stocker were among many relatives and friends at his side when he died at the Arcadia ranch on March 1, 1909.

After Baldwin's death, his estate was managed by his longtime friend and advisor Hiram A. Unruh. Land owned by the estate was relatively worthless upon his death, but ten years after his death, oil was discovered on it. This became the Montebello Oil Fields, which would produce one-eighth of the crude-oil in California, one of the biggest oil fields in the west.

He is most well-known today for his involvement in horse racing. Baldwin founded the original Santa Anita Park racetrack on his estate (later closed, and re-opened again on the estate's land), breeding and racing some of the finest racehorses of his time.

The actor William Hudson was cast as Baldwin in the 1957 episode, "The Man Who Was Never Licked" of the western television anthology series, Death Valley Days, hosted by Stanley Andrews. In the episode Robert Argent played Adolph Sutro, a key player in the Comstock Lode. After two marriages, Baldwin wed 16-year-old Jennie Dexter (Daria Massey), who bears him a second daughter twenty years after the birth of his first daughter.

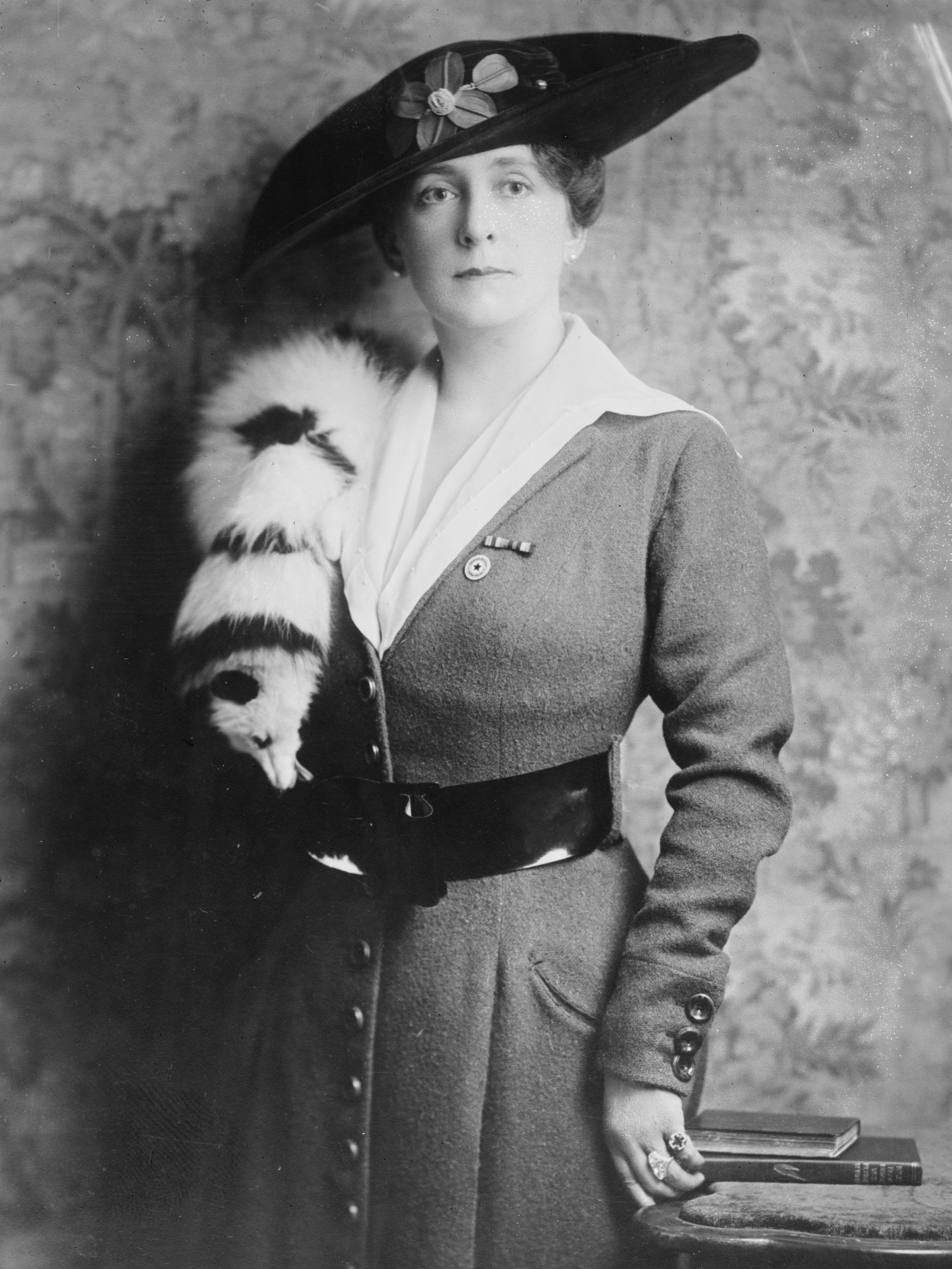
Lucky's daughter Anita Baldwin in 1929

The Baldwin Cottage, and Baldwin Pond are now on the grounds of the Los Angeles County Arboretum and Botanic Garden. In 2015, the Cottage and accompanying Coach Barn were opened for regularly scheduled docent-let tours.

The Baldwin Hills mountain range and its affluent Baldwin Hills neighborhood of South Los Angeles were named for him, as was the City of Baldwin Park, the Baldwin Stakes at Santa Anita, the Baldwin Village neighborhood, Baldwin Lake in the San Bernardino Mountains (near Baldwin's 1876 Gold Mountain Mine), Baldwin Beach at Lake Tahoe, and Baldwin Avenue in the San Gabriel Valley, among a number of places. His nickname also appears as the name of three pubs in Pasadena and Sierra Madre.

Lucky Baldwin's Pub in Pasadena is named in his honor.

In 2013, the city of Arcadia installed a 9-foot bronze statue of Baldwin titled A Dawn in the West by artist Alfred Paredes in the Monsignor Gerald M. O’Keefe Rose Garden near the main southern gate of Santa Anita Park race track. The statue was commissioned by two of Baldwin's descendants, Margaux Viera and Heather Gibson.

== See also ==
- Los Angeles County Arboretum and Botanic Garden
