= White Swan Inn, San Francisco =

Hotel in San Francisco, California

White Swan Inn
- Interactive map of the White Swan Inn area

General information
- Location: 845 Bush Street, San Francisco, California, United States
- Coordinates: 37.7899°N 122.4112°W

Technical details
- Floor count: 4

The White Swan Inn is a hotel at 845 Bush Street in the Nob Hill neighborhood of San Francisco, California, United States. It was established, along with an adjacent sister property named Petite Auberge, by "an eccentric aunt" in the 1950s after she married a wealthy local man. Both properties have 26 guestrooms and were renovated in 2018.
