= A Dawn in the West =

Bronze statue

A Dawn In The West
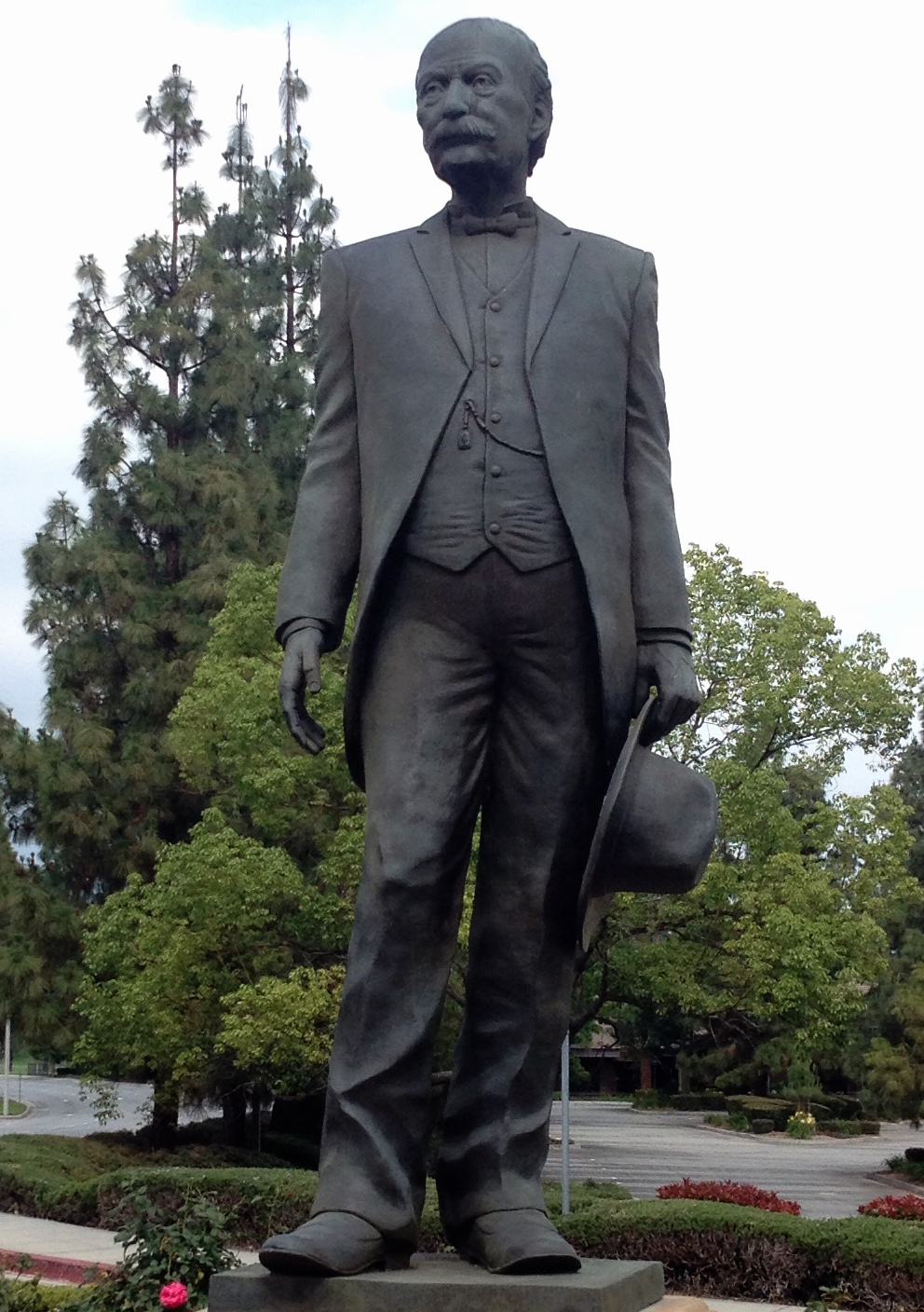
- A 2015 photo of the statue
- Artist: Alfred Paredes
- Year: 2013
- Type: Bronze Statue
- Subject: Elias J. “Lucky” Baldwin
- Dimensions: 2.7 m (9 ft)
- Location: Arcadia, California; 34.131423°N 118.045705°W

A Dawn In The West is the title of a 2013 bronze statue by Alfred Paredes of Elias J. “Lucky” Baldwin (1828–1909), pioneer California rancher, businessman founder and first mayor of Arcadia. Commissioned and donated to the City of Arcadia by Baldwin's great, great, great granddaughters, Margaux Gibson-Viera and Heather Gibson, both of California, the 9-foot bronze figure of Baldwin stands on a 4-foot concrete plinth in the center of the Monsignor Gerald M. O’Keefe Rose Garden, at the intersection of Huntington Drive and Holly Avenue, in Arcadia, California. It was dedicated on April 16, 2013.

A Dawn In The West depicts Baldwin at about the age of 80 as he surveys the site of his home and ranch located nearby. The figure is positioned looking northwest toward the home that Baldwin occupied at the time, known as the Hugo Reid Adobe, which is now preserved at the Los Angeles County Arboretum and Botanic Garden.

== Artist ==
Alfred Paredes, an artist and sculptor of fine art portraits, models and collectibles used in the toy and entertainment industries. A native of El Monte, California, he created the Baldwin statue at his AP Sculpture Studios in Pomona, California. His work has appeared at venues including Grand Central Terminal, New York; the War of 1812 Bicentennial exhibition at Niagara Falls, Ontario; and in numerous television and Hollywood productions.

== Subject ==
Baldwin, a native of Butler County, Ohio, traveled by covered wagon to San Francisco in 1853. He worked there as a real estate developer, livery owner and brick manufacturer.

He made a substantial fortune after the American Civil War in the Nevada Comstock Lode mining bonanza and used his profits to build a luxury hotel and theater in San Francisco at Powell and Market Streets, which he opened in 1877 (burned down 1898). He was a leading member of San Francisco's powerful and influential business community at the time and in 1875 he was elected the first president of the Pacific Stock Exchange.

Baldwin also became a nationally known breeder whose horses won most of the big races at the time including the most important, the American Derby, three times between 1885 and 1888. His ranch and farm land produced grains, citrus fruit and grapes that were used in award-winning wines, brandies and champagnes.

Baldwin owned thousands of acres in Los Angeles County, including Rancho La Cienega, where oil fields were later developed that continue to produce petroleum to this day. His landholdings including what is now the community of Baldwin Hills and the cities of Baldwin Park and Sierra Madre.
