= Hiram A. Unruh =

American politician (1845–1916)

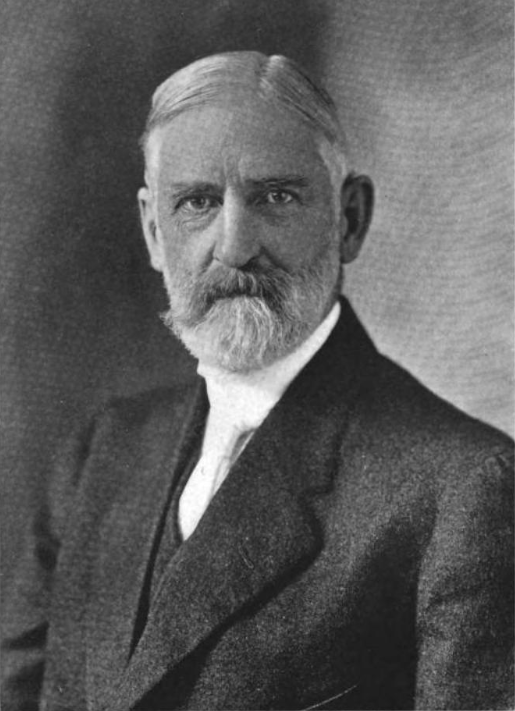
- Born: Hiram Augustus Unruh; November 1, 1845; Valparaiso, Indiana
- Died: December 16, 1916 (aged 71); Los Angeles County, California
- Resting place: Evergreen Cemetery
- Occupation: Businessman
- Spouse: Jane Anne Dunn (m. 1868)
- Children: 2

Hiram Augustus Unruh (November 1, 1845 – December 16, 1916) was a Union Army soldier from Indiana who became a prominent businessman in California.

== Biography ==
Hiram A. Unruh was born in Valparaiso, Indiana on November 1, 1845. During the Civil War, he joined the 20th Indiana Infantry Regiment. He was captured and held in Libby Prison. After being released on parole and then exchanged for a Confederate prisoner, he reenlisted with the 1st United States Marine Artillery Volunteers.

After the war, he studied telegraphy, and worked for Western Union, Wells Fargo, and for Central Pacific Railroad crews building telegraph lines in California. He married Jane Anne Dunn on October 10, 1868, and they had two sons.

Unruh was a friend and advisor to E. J. "Lucky" Baldwin, and began managing his business affairs in 1879. He became the executor of his substantial estate after Baldwin's death in 1909, making investments which earned large returns for his heirs.

Hiram A. Unruh died while returning from an automobile trip to Arcadia, California from Los Angeles. He is buried at Evergreen Cemetery.
