= Baldwin Hotel (San Francisco) =

Demolished hotel in San Francisco

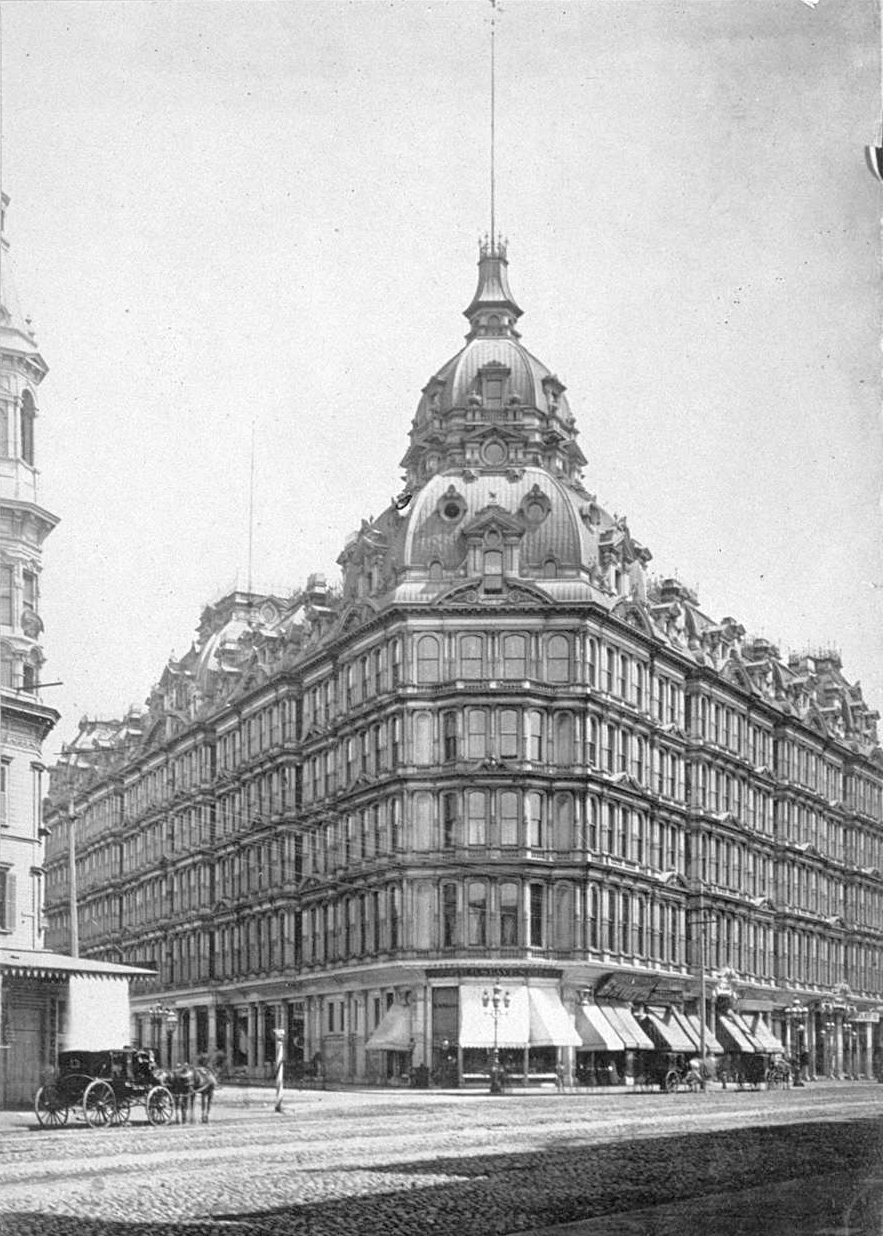
- Baldwin Hotel and Theatre

- Location within San Francisco County Location within California Location within the United States

General information
- Type: Masonry on steel
- Location: Market and Powell Streets, San Francisco, San Francisco, United States
- Coordinates: 37.7849°N 122.4074°W
- Completed: 1875–76
- Destroyed: 1898
- Owner: Lucky Baldwin

Design and construction
- Architects: Sumner Bugbee, Second Empire style

Baldwin Hotel was a 19th-century luxury hotel and theatre built by Comstock Lode millionaire, entrepreneur, and gambler Elias Jackson "Lucky" Baldwin, formerly in downtown San Francisco, California. It was located on Powell Street at the corner of Market Street, near the Union Square area.

== History ==
The Baldwin Theatre was completed in 1875, and the Baldwin Hotel was completed around it in 1876. The hotel was designed in the Second Empire style by architect Sumner Bugbee.

The theatre featured touring performers and it was first known as Baldwin's Academy of Music. Most of the touring performers of the day appeared there. The hotel and theatre occupied the entire block. The ground floor was divided into a number of large stores.

A theatre attendee, Mrs. Frank Leslie, described the building in 1877:

"In the evening, by way of severe contrast [to the Mission Dolores they visited earlier that day], we went to Baldwin's Theatre, attached to the hotel of the same name and just finished. It is really the prettiest to be seen in any part of the world -- a perfect little gem, fitted up like a bonbonniere in crimson satin and gold. The six proscenium boxes on either side, and the row of French boxes at the back are marvelously pretty. Nothing could be more rich and exquisite in refinement of taste. The symmetry of the house is unmarred by rows of pillars, the galleries being suspended from the roof."

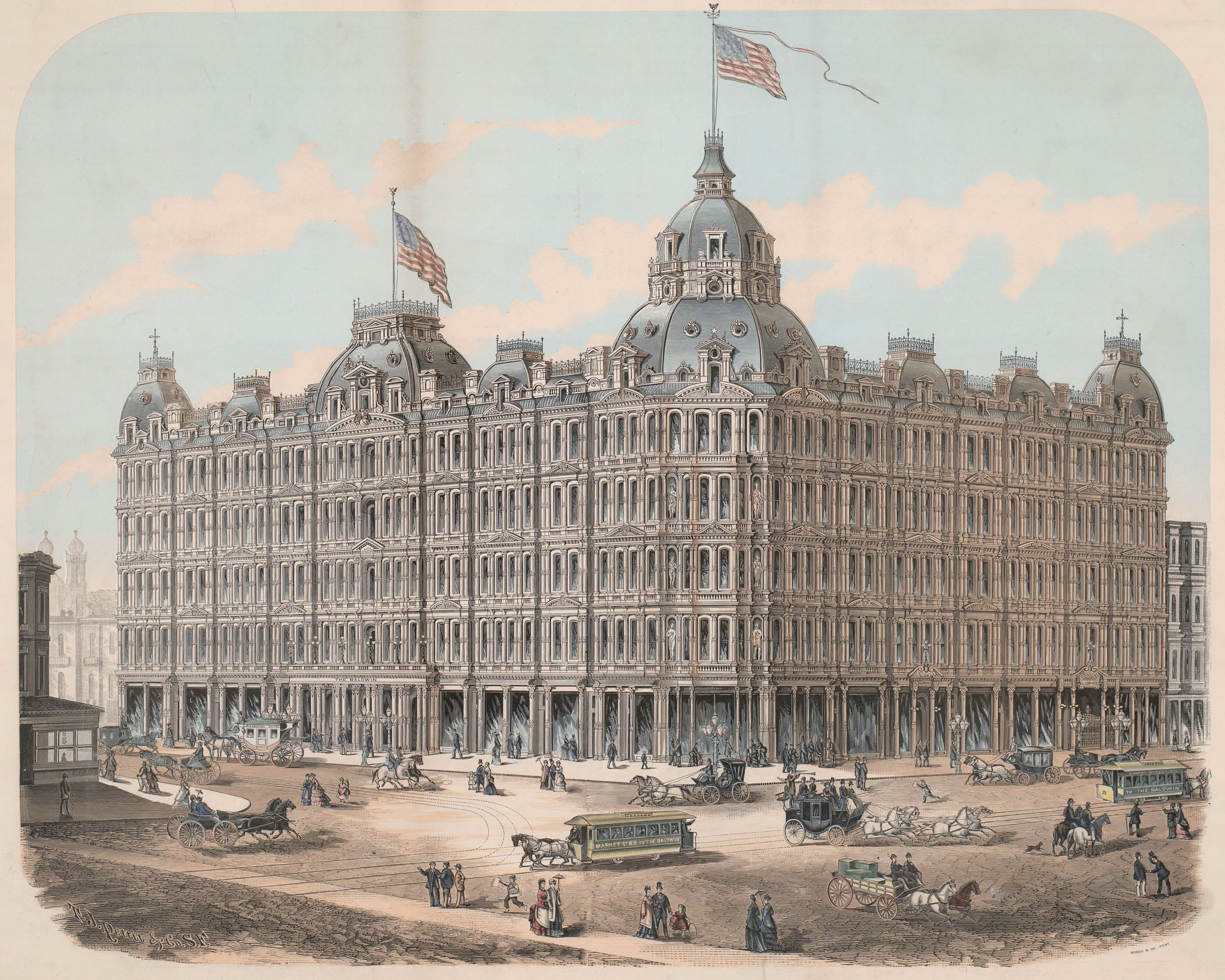
A wood engraving of the hotel

=== Destruction ===
The entire building was destroyed by fire in 1898. Two people were killed, and the adjacent Columbia Theater building on Powell Street suffered considerable damage. After the Baldwin Hotel building was demolished, the Flood Building was built on the site in 1904.
