= Huntington Hotel (San Francisco) =

Hotel in San Francisco, California

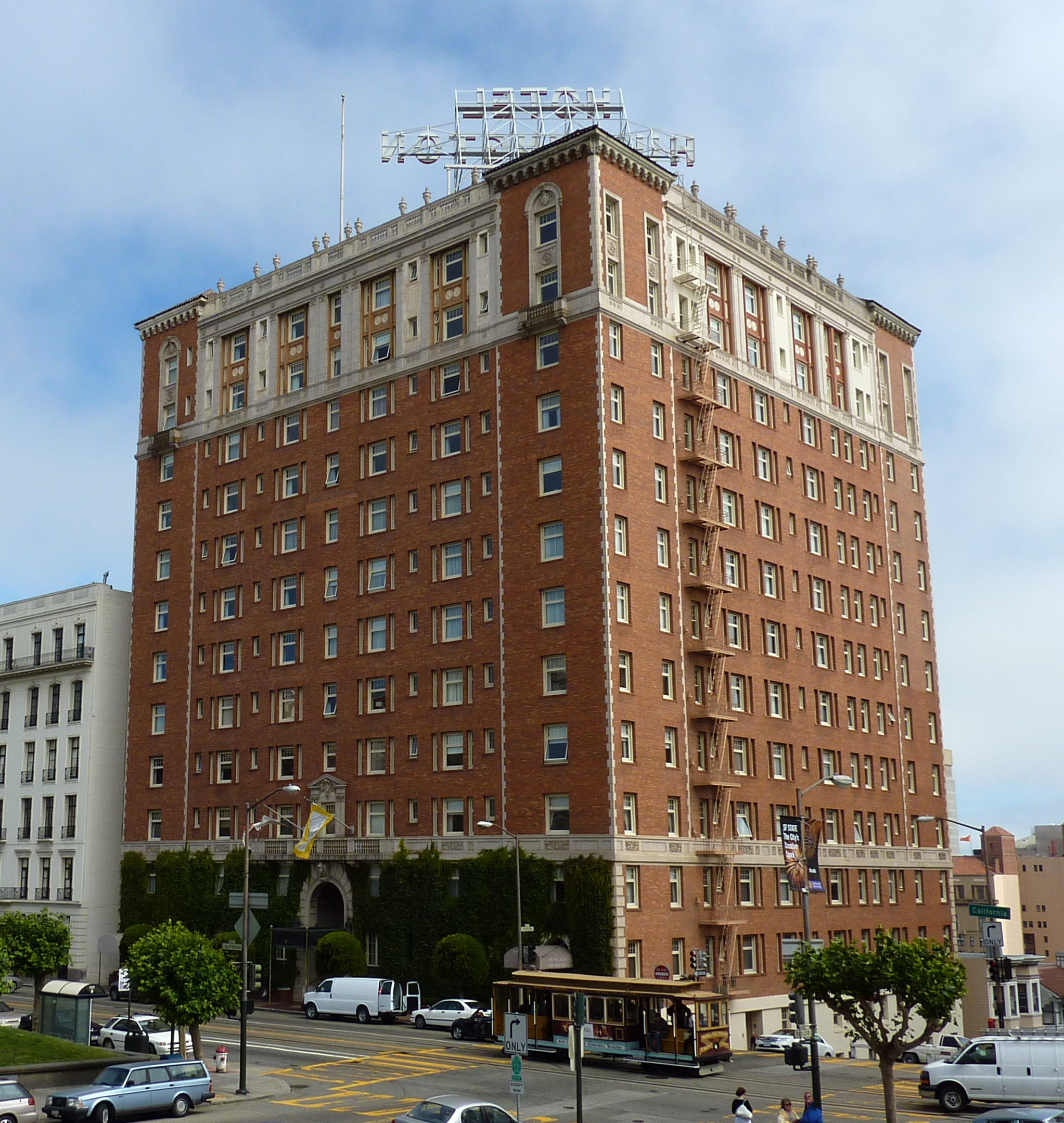

- Location in Central San Francisco

General information
- Location: United States, 1075 California Street; San Francisco, California
- Coordinates: 37°47′29″N 122°24′44″W
- Opening: 1922; 104 years ago
- Owner: Woodridge Capital

Technical details
- Floor count: 12

Other information
- Number of rooms: 135

Website
- thehuntingtonhotel.com
- Huntington Hotel
- U.S. National Register of Historic Places
- NRHP reference No.: 100012288
- Added to NRHP: September 23, 2025

The Huntington Hotel is a historic luxury hotel at the top of the Nob Hill district of San Francisco, California. It is located at 1075 California Street, corner of Taylor Street. The hotel is a twelve-story, Georgian-style brick building that features 135 guest rooms and suites. In September 2025 the hotel was added to the National Register of Historic Places.

== Description ==
The hotel is named after Collis P. Huntington, one of the Big Four railroad tycoons of the Old West. However, it is across California Street from the location of Huntington's mansion, on the site of a mansion owned by the Tobin family, founders of the Hibernia Bank. It was originally designed by Weeks and Day as the Huntington Apartments in 1922, and was converted to a hotel by real estate developer Eugene Fritz, who bought the property in 1924. Fritz's grandchildren ran the hotel until selling it in 2011 to Singapore-based Grace International. The hotel closed on January 4, 2014, and reopened in May 2014 as The Scarlet Huntington, following a $15 million renovation. The hotel was sold to Los Angeles-based Woodridge Capital on September 28, 2018, for $51.9 million, and returned to its historic name, the Huntington Hotel.

The hotel closed in early 2020, due to the COVID-19 pandemic. In September 2022, it was announced that the hotel would remain closed, because the owners had defaulted on the hotel's $56.2 million mortgage, and the lender, Deutsche Bank was seeking to foreclose on the property. Deutsche Bank scheduled multiple auctions of the property, which were all cancelled. In March 2023, Highgate Hotels and Flynn Properties partnered to take over the hotel's delinquent loans, purchasing the Huntington Hotel's mortgage. Flynn began renovating the hotel in 2024, with tentative plans to reopen it in 2025. In December 2025, the hotel announced plans to reopen in spring of 2026. It reopened on March 1, 2026.

The Big Four restaurant in the Huntington Hotel was opened in 1976 by Dolly Fritz-Cope, then the owner of the hotel, and was popular with San Francisco high society until the 21st century. It closed in 2020 and reopened in 2026 under new ownership, after an extensive renovation. The other restaurant in the hotel, L'Etoile, closed in 1990 and was replaced in 2001 with the Nob Hill Spa.
