= Nob Hill, San Francisco =

Nob Hill
- Neighborhood
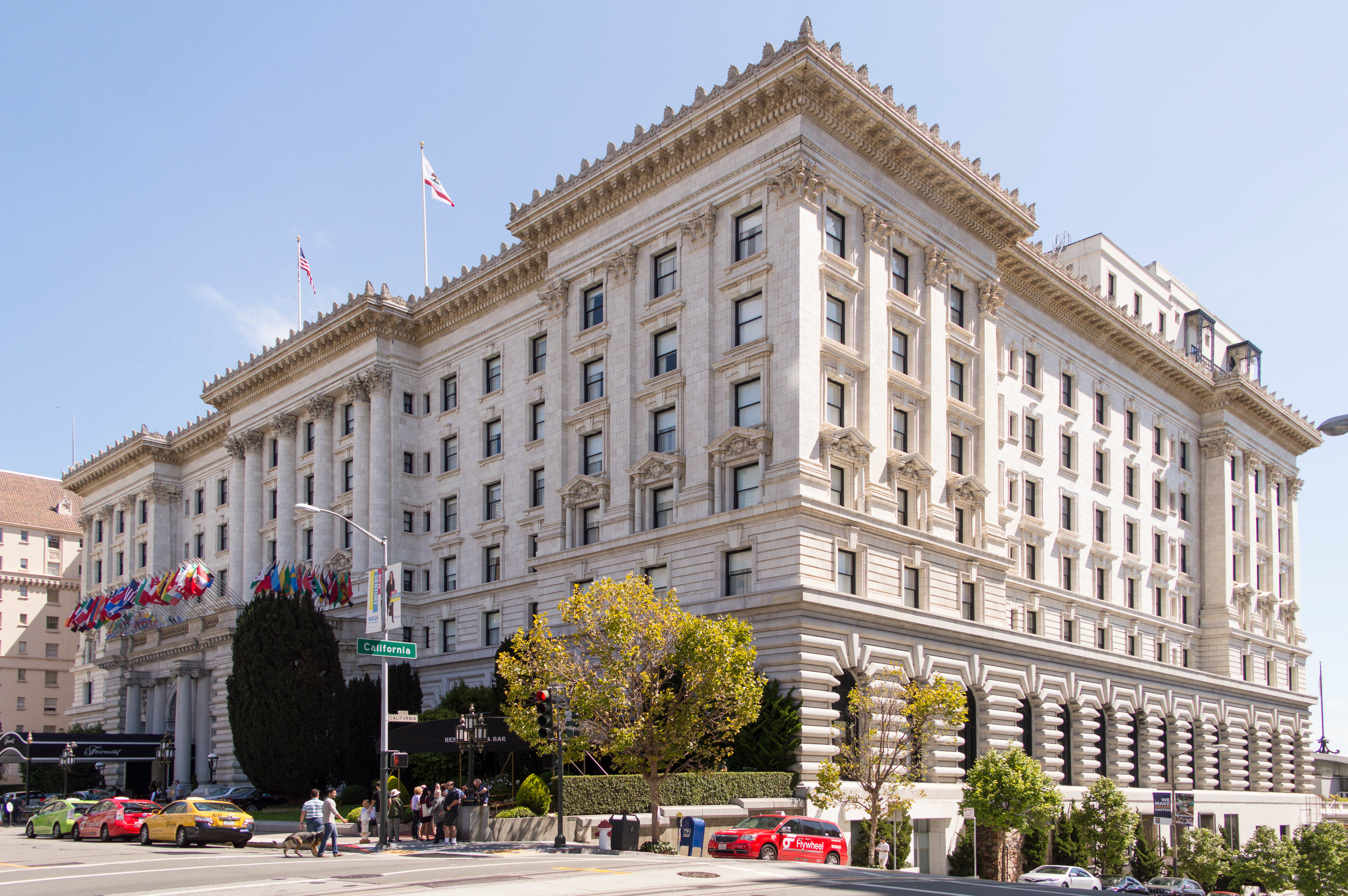
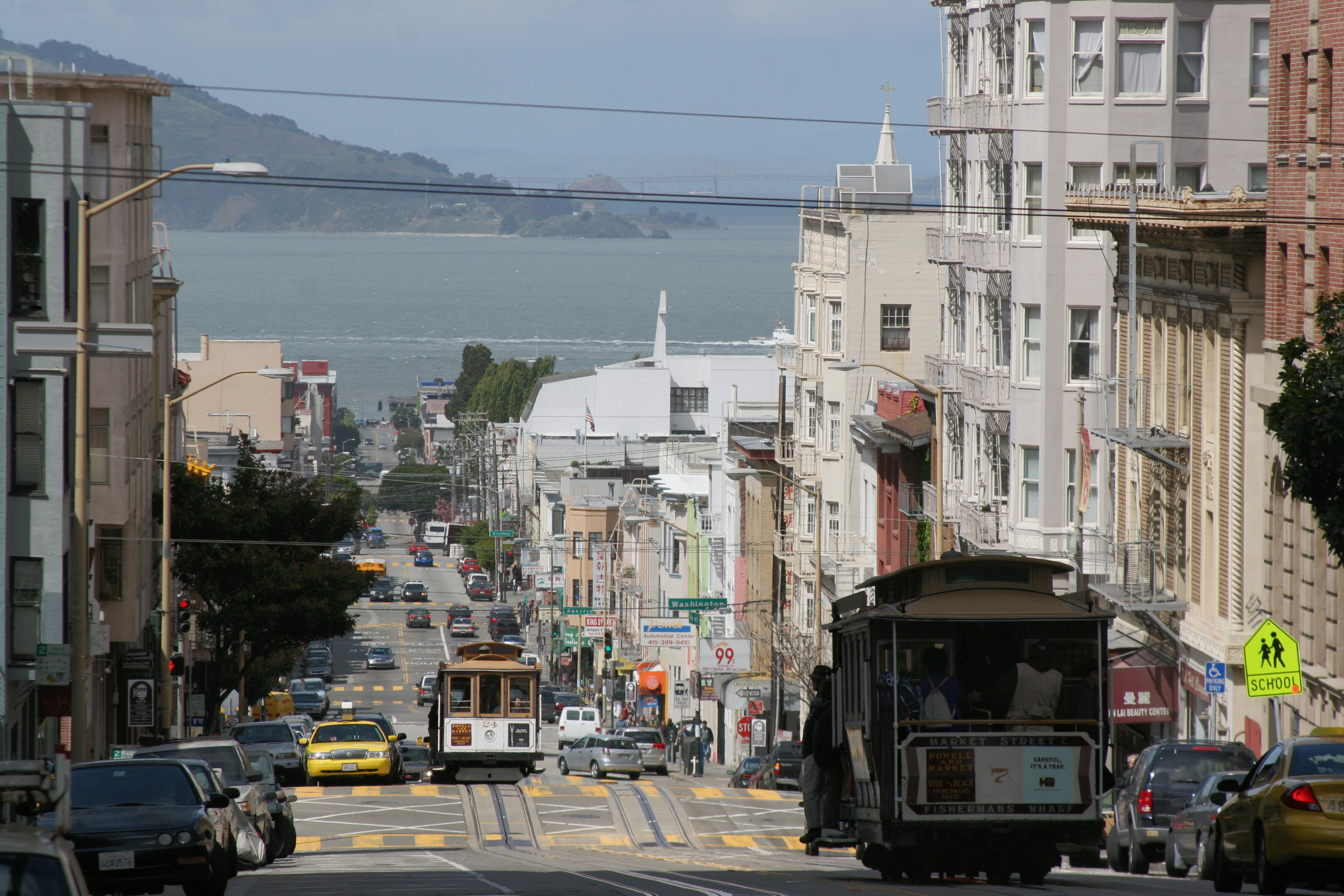
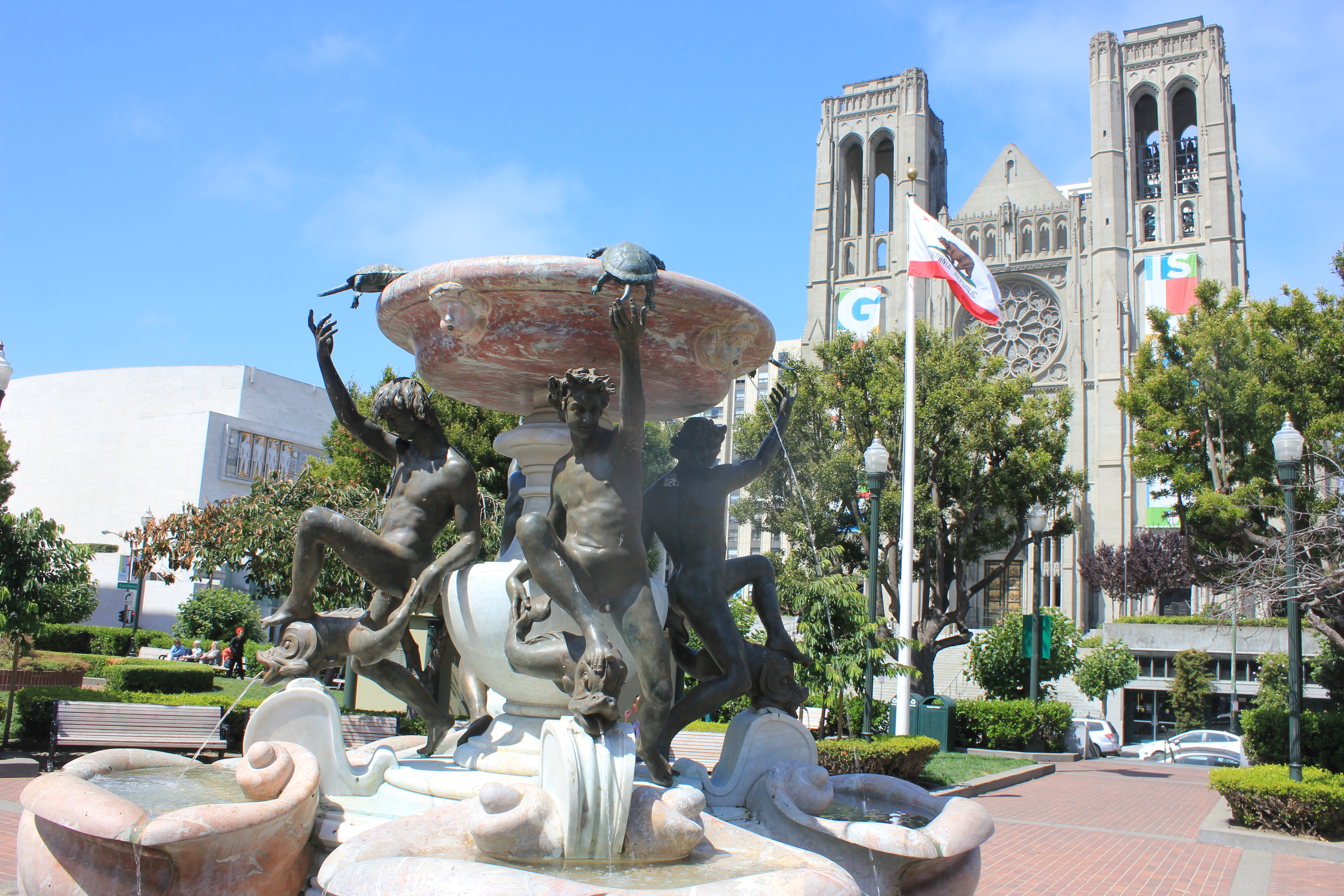
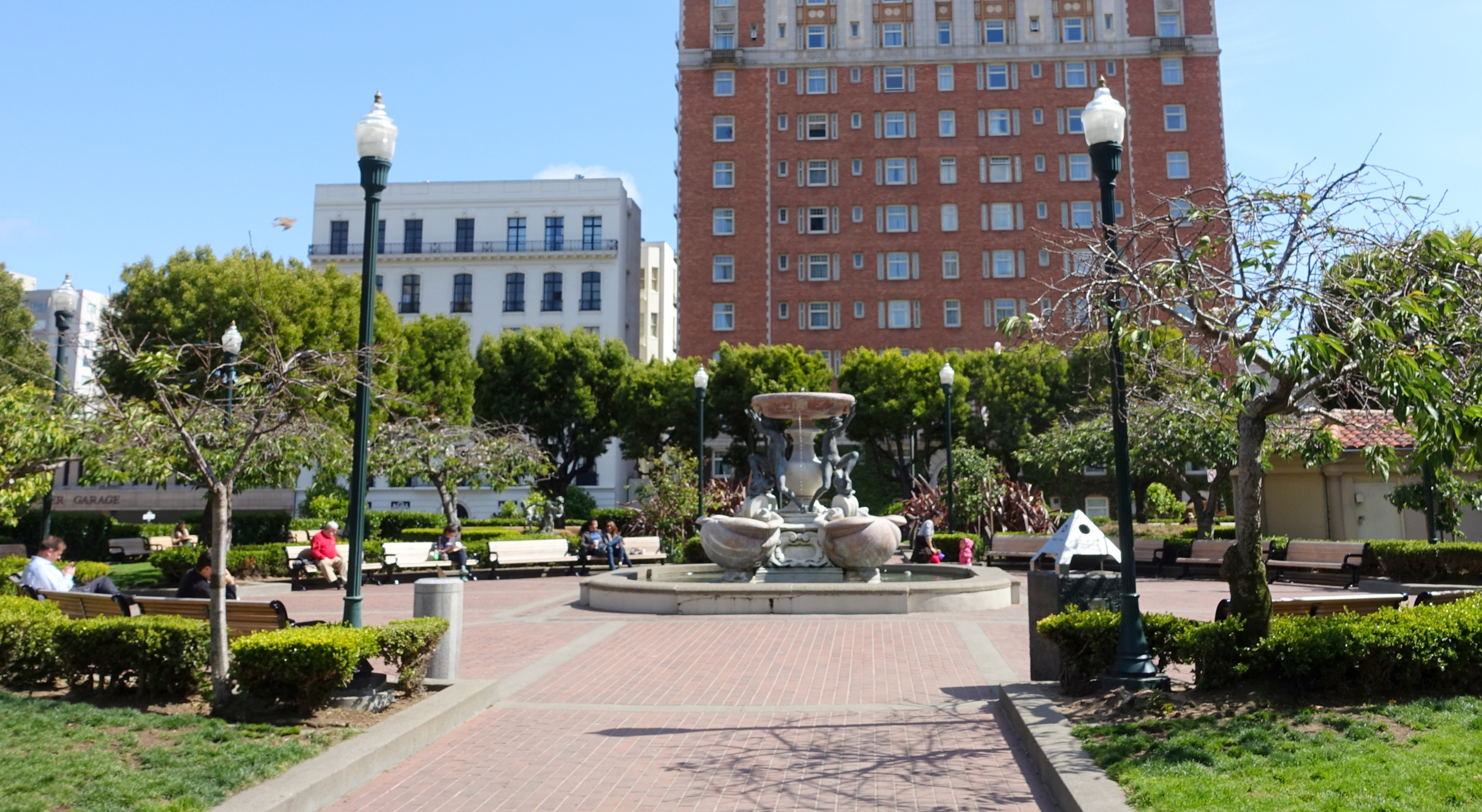
- Counter-clockwise: Fairmont San Francisco; Powell Street; Huntington Park; Grace Cathedral

- Location within Central San Francisco
- Coordinates: 37.79323°N 122.41448°W
- Country: United States
- State: California
- City-county: San Francisco

Government
  - Supervisor: Danny Sauter
  - Assemblymember: Matt Haney (D)
  - State senator: Scott Wiener (D)
  - U. S. rep.: Nancy Pelosi (D)

Area
  - Total: 0.313 sq mi (0.81 km^{2})

Population
  - Total: 20,388
  - Density: 65,100/sq mi (25,100/km^{2})
- Time zone: UTC−8 (Pacific)
  - Summer (DST): UTC−7 (PDT)
- ZIP codes: 94108, 94109, 94133
- Area codes: 415/628

Nob Hill is a neighborhood of San Francisco, California, United States that is known for its numerous luxury hotels and historic mansions. Nob Hill has historically served as a center of San Francisco's upper class. Nob Hill is among the highest-income neighborhoods in the United States, as well as one of the most desirable and expensive real estate markets in the country. Prior to the COVID-19 pandemic, it was the most expensive real estate market per square meter, narrowly beating Monte Carlo, although it has since fallen heavily. It was the only place in the United States so far where market price per square meter exceeded the average yearly salary in the country ($72,400).

Nob Hill is a luxury destination in San Francisco, owing to its numerous Michelin-starred restaurants, boutiques, cultural institutions, art galleries, and historic landmarks. The neighborhood is named after one of San Francisco's original "Seven Hills" and it contains the Lower Nob Hill Apartment Hotel District (also known as Lower Nob Hill).

== Location ==
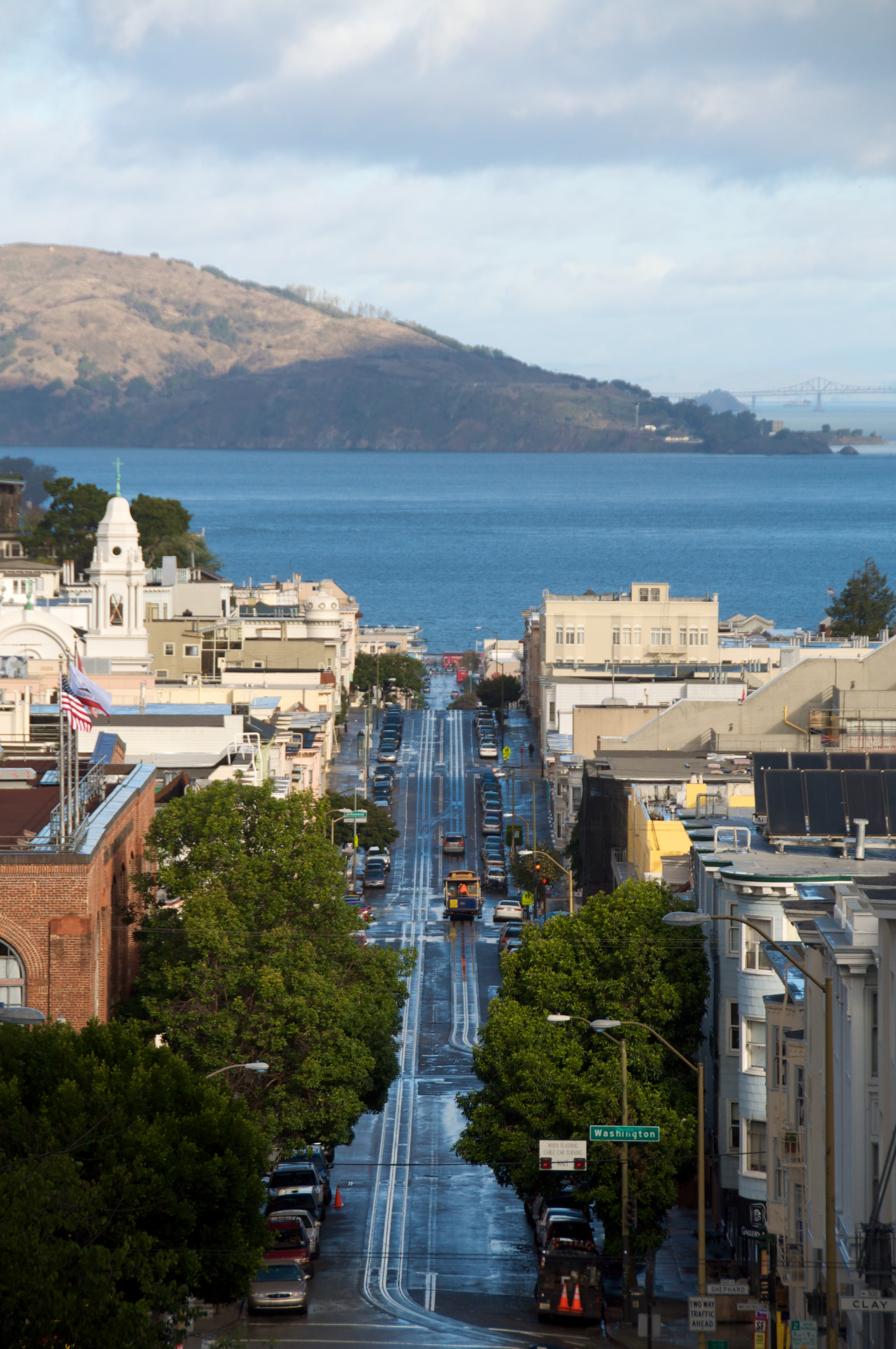
View of the San Francisco Bay from Mason Street

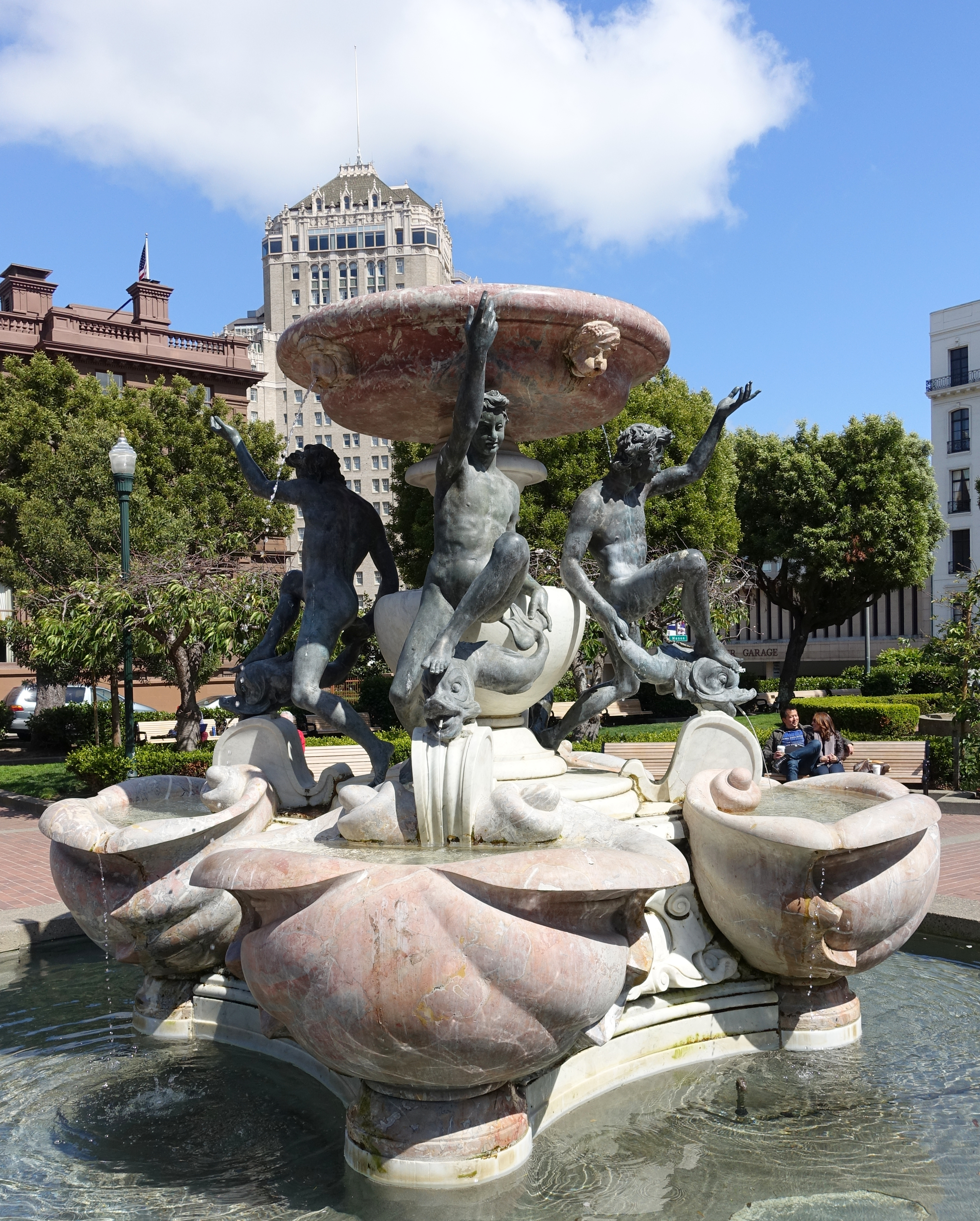
Fontana delle Tartarughe in Huntington Park

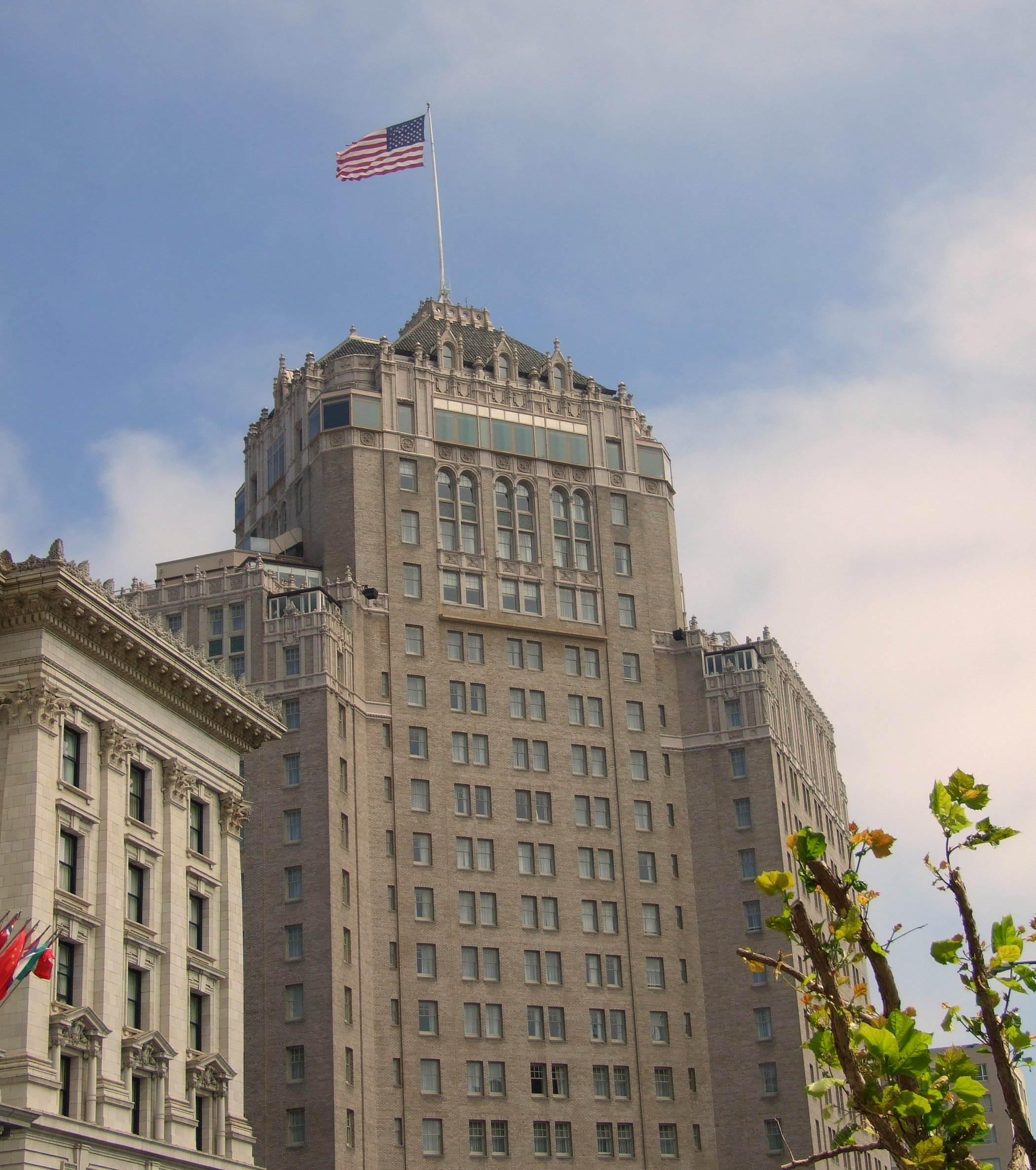
The InterContinental Mark Hopkins Hotel

The actual peak of Nob Hill lies approximately at the intersection of Jones and Sacramento Streets.

North of Nob Hill is Russian Hill. West of the district is Pacific Heights. To the south of Nob Hill is the Union Square shopping district, Civic Center district, and the Tendernob neighborhood. East of Nob Hill is Chinatown and the Financial District. Northeast of Nob Hill is North Beach and Telegraph Hill.

The Polk Gulch area comprises the westernmost portions of Nob Hill and Russian Hill. The southern portion of Nob Hill is known as Lower Nob Hill. On its southwest slope, the area in between Nob Hill and the Tenderloin neighborhood is an area known as the Tendernob.

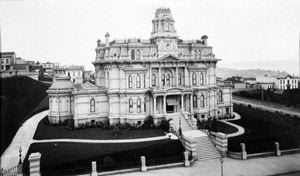
Charles Crocker mansion.

== History ==
Prior to the 1850s, Nob Hill was called California Hill (after California Street, which climbs its steep eastern face), but was renamed after the Central Pacific Railroad's Big Four – known as the Nobs – who built their mansions on the hill.

The area was settled in the rapid urbanization happening in the city in the late 19th century. Because of the views and its central position, it became an exclusive enclave of the rich and famous on the west coast who built large mansions in the neighborhood. This included prominent tycoons such as Leland Stanford, founder of Stanford University and other members of The Big Four. These early citizens were known as nabobs, a term for prominent and wealthy men. This was shortened to nob, probably the origin of the area's eventual name.

The neighborhood was destroyed in the 1906 earthquake and fire, except for the granite walls surrounding the Stanford, Crocker, Huntington and Hopkins mansions. These walls remain and black scars caused by smoke from the intense fires that burned after the quake can still be seen.

Also gutted by the fires was the newly completed Fairmont Hotel at Mason and California Streets, as well as the mansion of tycoon James Clair Flood. Both structures had stone exteriors that survived the fires, and both buildings were subsequently cleaned and refurbished. The Fairmont Hotel remains in operation to this day and the Flood Mansion is the headquarters of the exclusive Pacific-Union Club.

While the neighborhood was able to maintain its affluence following the quake, every mansion owner moved or rebuilt elsewhere. Some rebuilt mansions further west in San Francisco, for example, in Pacific Heights and Cow Hollow. In place of where the mansions had been located, swank hotels were erected. Hotels built over the ruins of the former mansions include the Mark Hopkins, Huntington, and Stanford Court.

== Characteristics ==
Nob Hill is an affluent district, home to many of the city's upper-class families as well as a large young urban professional population, and a growing Chinese immigrant population from Chinatown to the east.

Four of San Francisco's well-known and most expensive hotels are located on Nob Hill, along California Street: the Mark Hopkins Hotel, the Stanford Court, the Huntington Hotel, and the Fairmont Hotel. The hotels were named for San Francisco tycoons Mark Hopkins, Leland Stanford, & Collis Potter Huntington — three of the Big Four entrepreneurs of the construction of the Central Pacific Railroad — and James Graham Fair, respectively.

Opposite the Fairmont Hotel and Pacific Union Club is Grace Cathedral, one of the city's largest houses of worship.

The Grand Lodge of California's headquarters are the SF Masonic Auditorium.

In Lower Nob Hill, the Academy of Art University owns and operates several buildings for housing and educational opportunities.

Also in lower Nob Hill, on Bush Street, are the Memorial Home of Fire Chief Dennis T. Sullivan and the sister hotels, the White Swan Inn and Petite Auberge.

== Parks ==
There are numerous historic and well maintained parks throughout Nob Hill. The most prominent park in the neighborhood is Huntington Park, which takes up an entire block, bounded by Sacramento Street to the north, Taylor Street to the west, California Street to the south, and Cushman Street to the east. Huntington Park was formerly the site of the mansion of Central Pacific Railroad baron Collis Potter Huntington; the mansion was destroyed by the 1906 earthquake and fire, however, and Huntington's widow donated the property to the city to establish a park in 1915. Huntington Park has a playground for children, landscaping, and several fountains.

Washington & Hyde Mini Park is situated on a single lot between two apartment buildings on the north side of Washington Street, between Hyde Street and Leavenworth Street. Washington & Hyde Mini Park has a playground for children and landscaping.

== Gallery ==
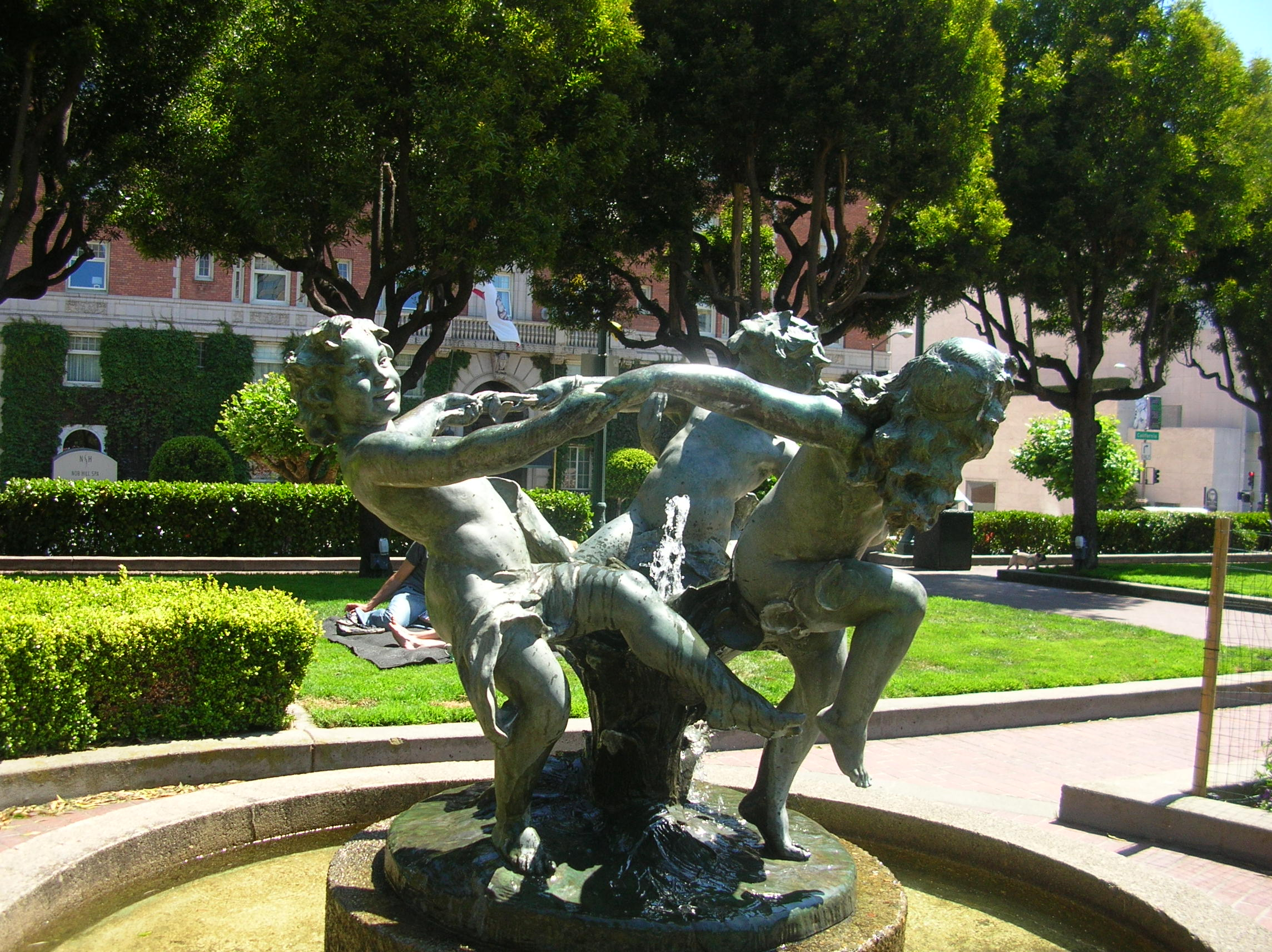
Dancing Sprites by Henri-Léon Gréber

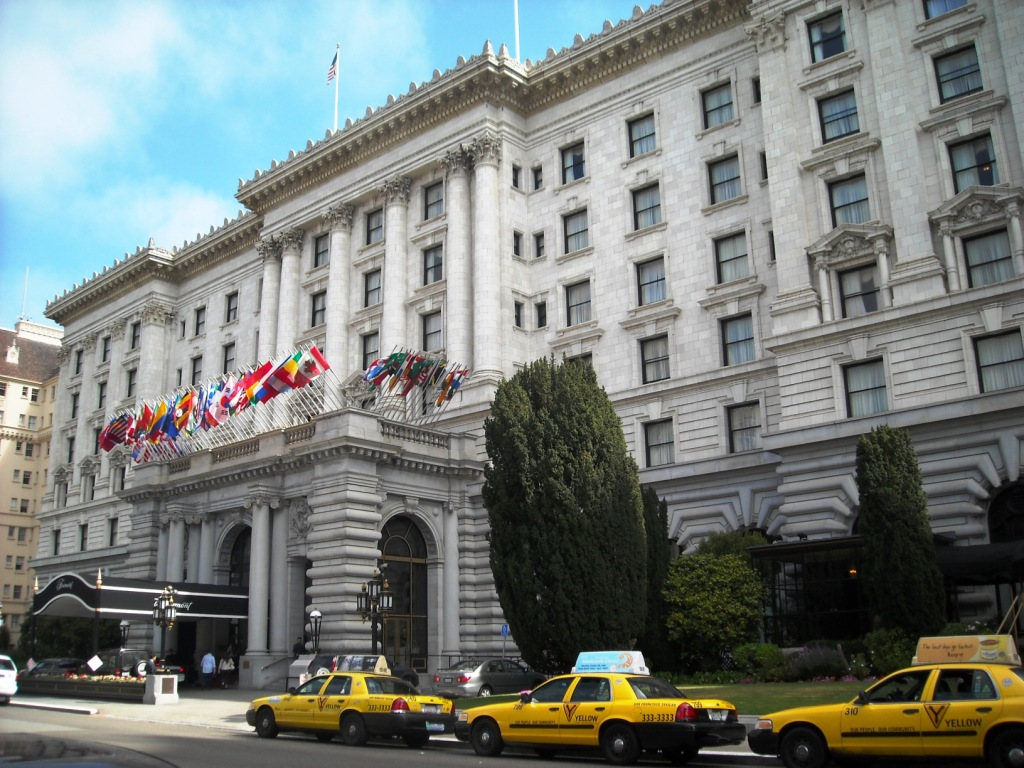
Fairmont San Francisco

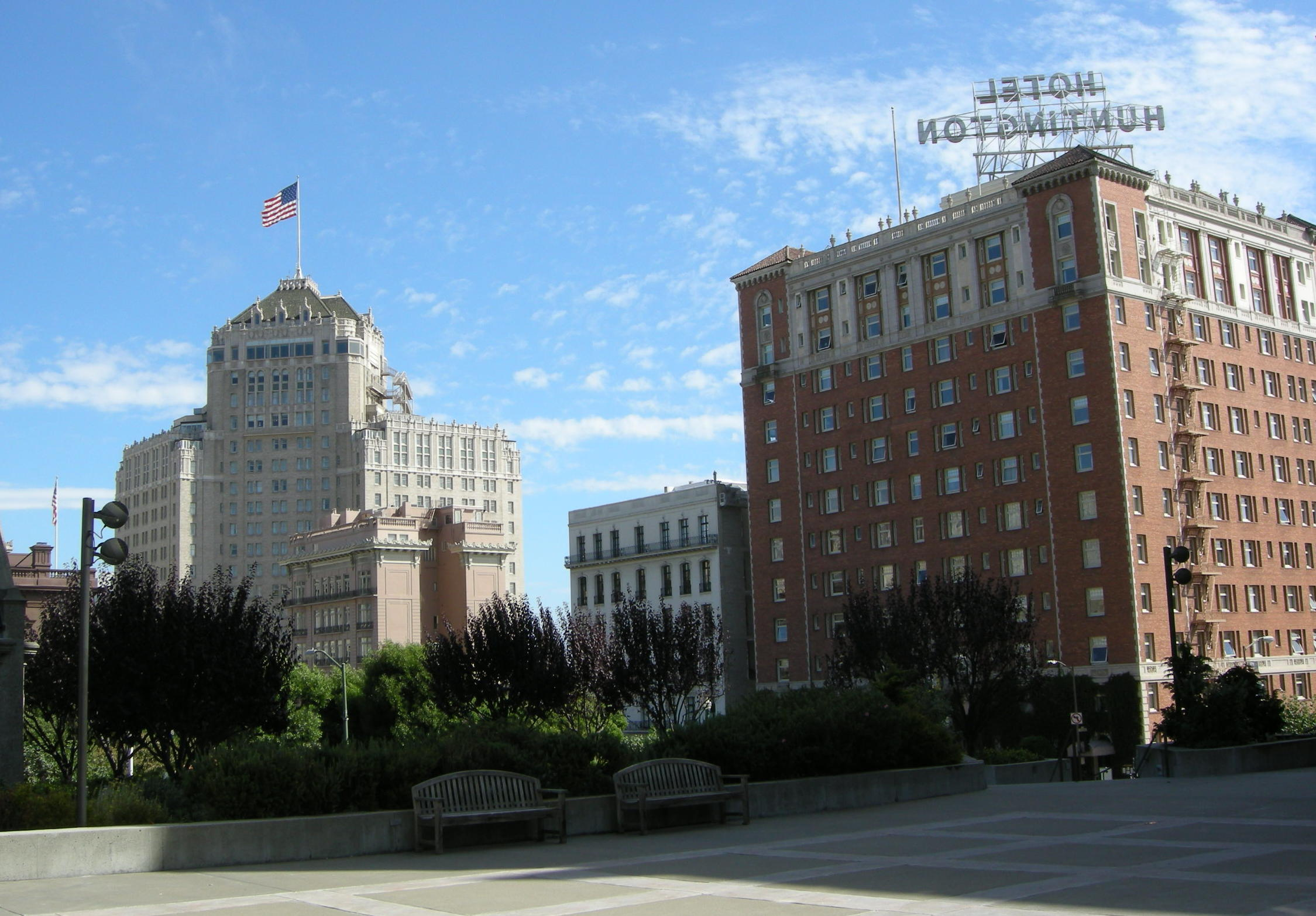
The Mark Hopkins Hotel and Huntington Hotel

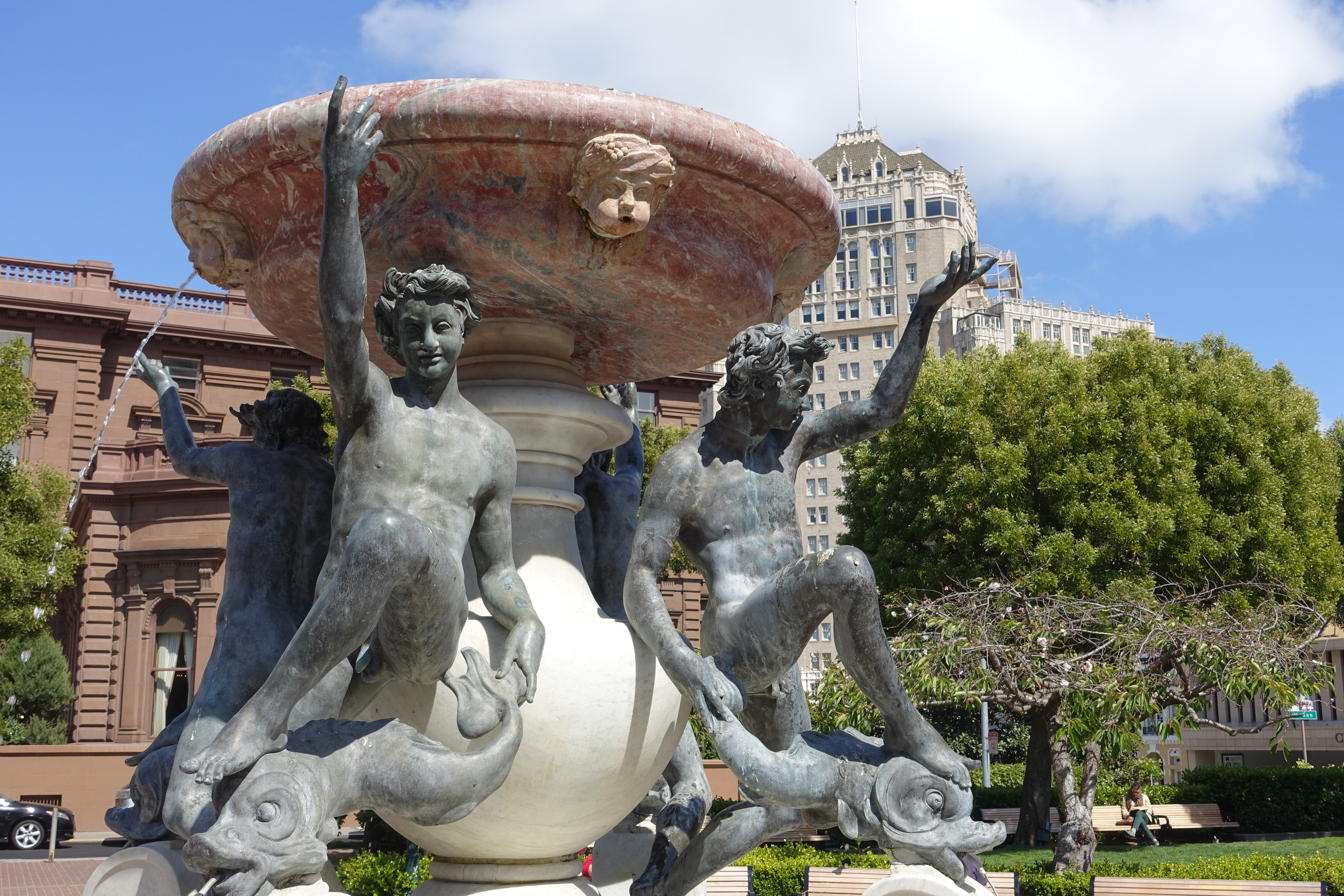
Fontana delle Tartarughe in Huntington Park

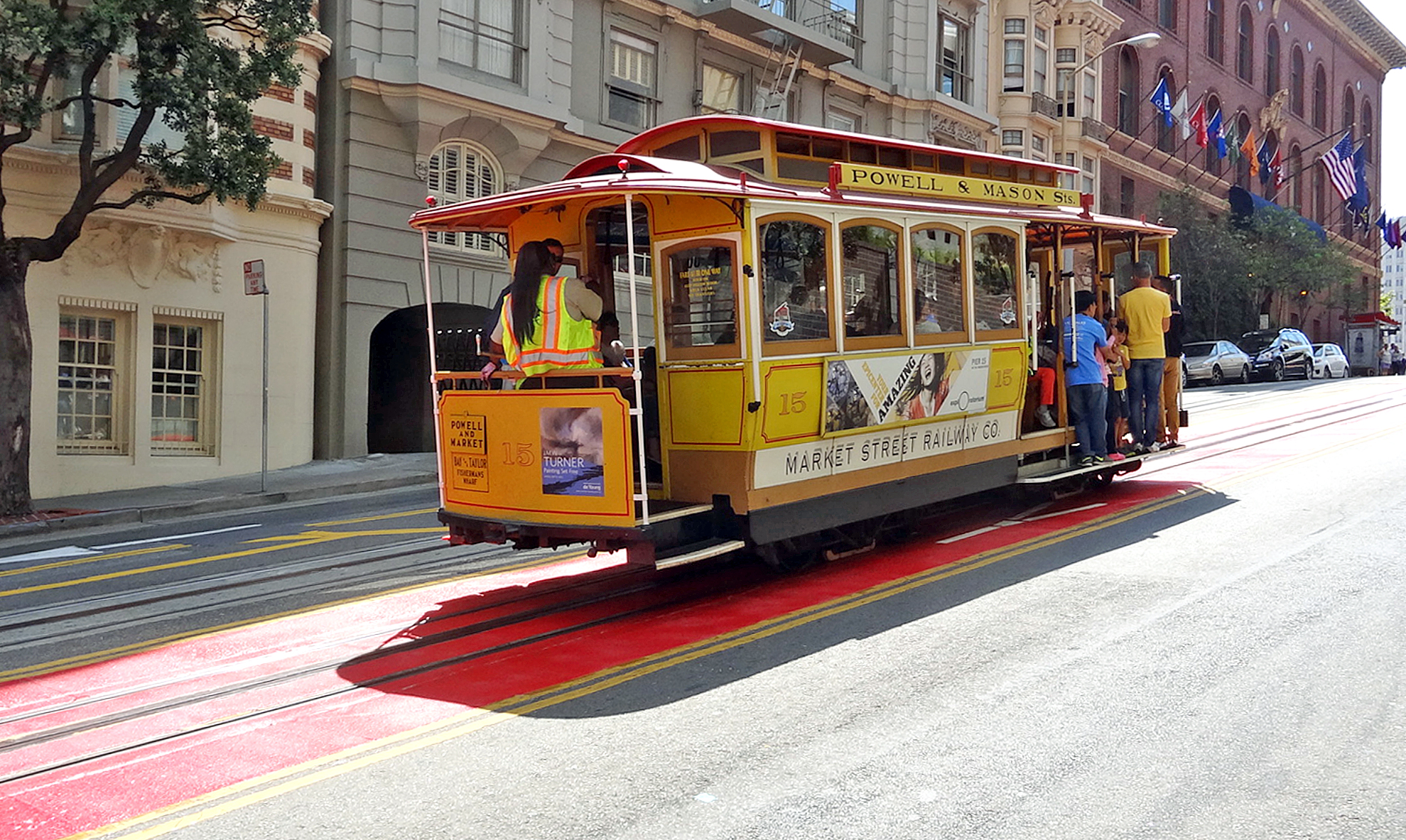
San Francisco cable car on Powell Street

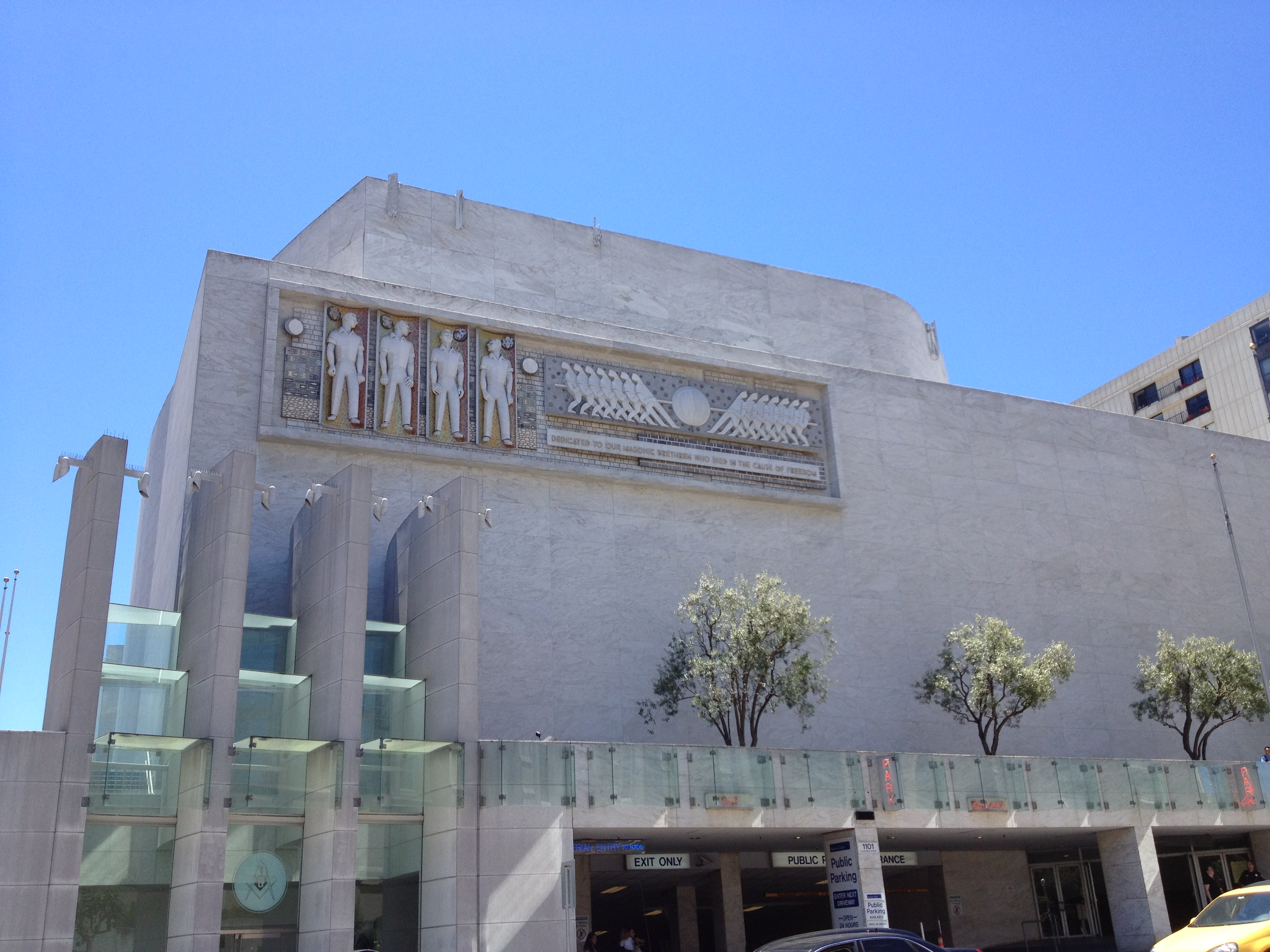
The Grand Lodge of California's Masonic Auditorium

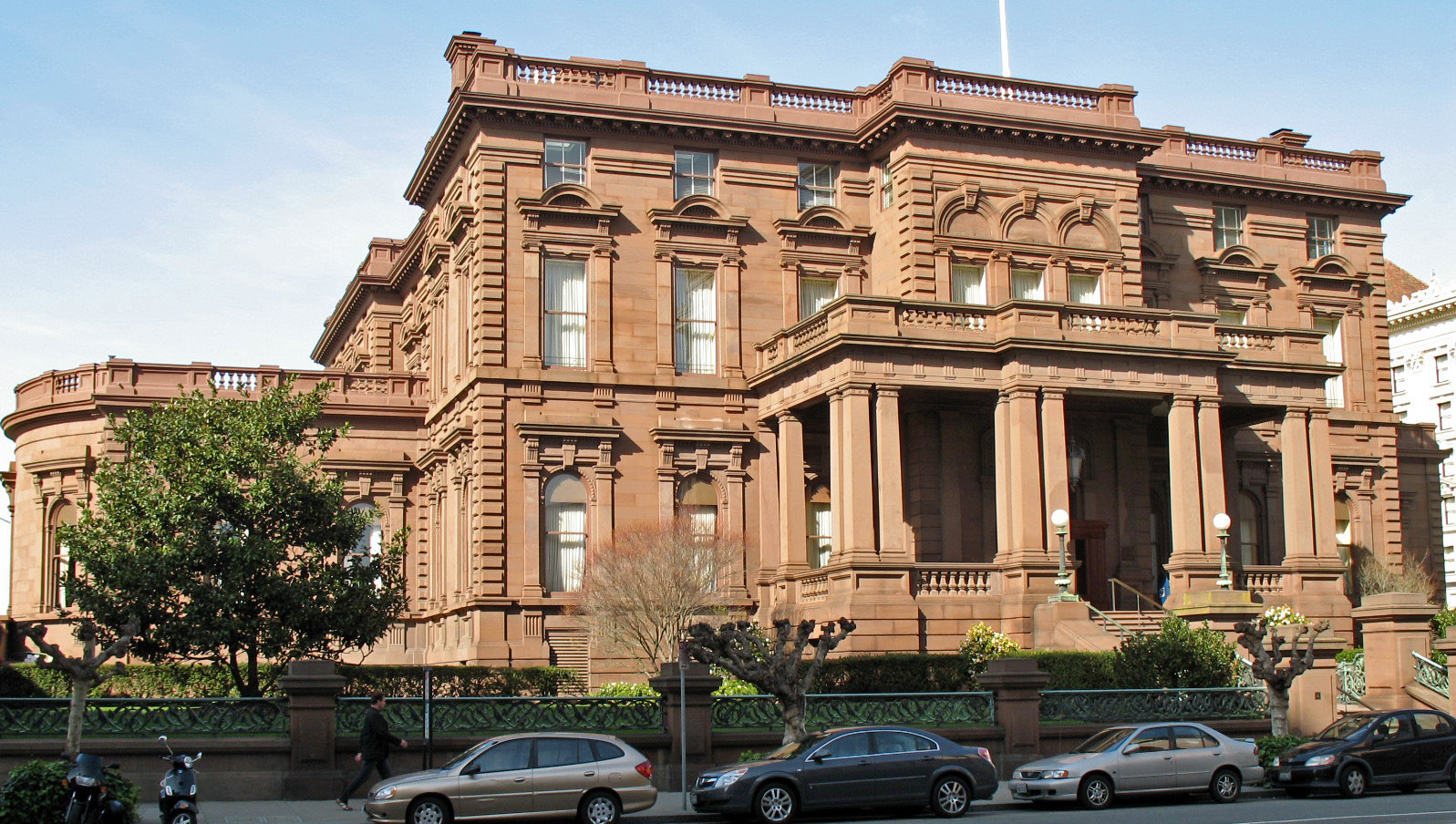
The Pacific-Union Club's Flood Mansion

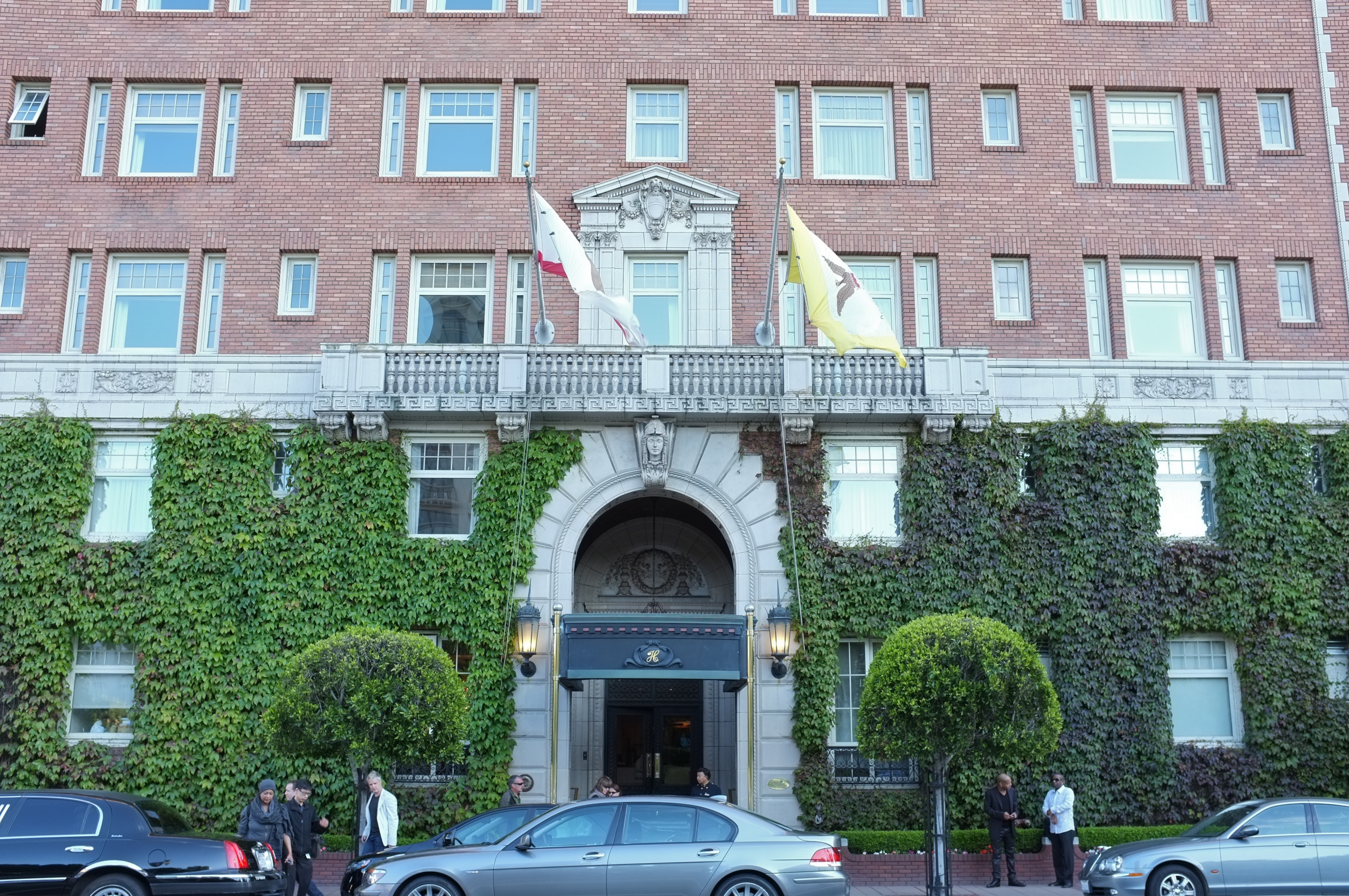
Huntington Hotel

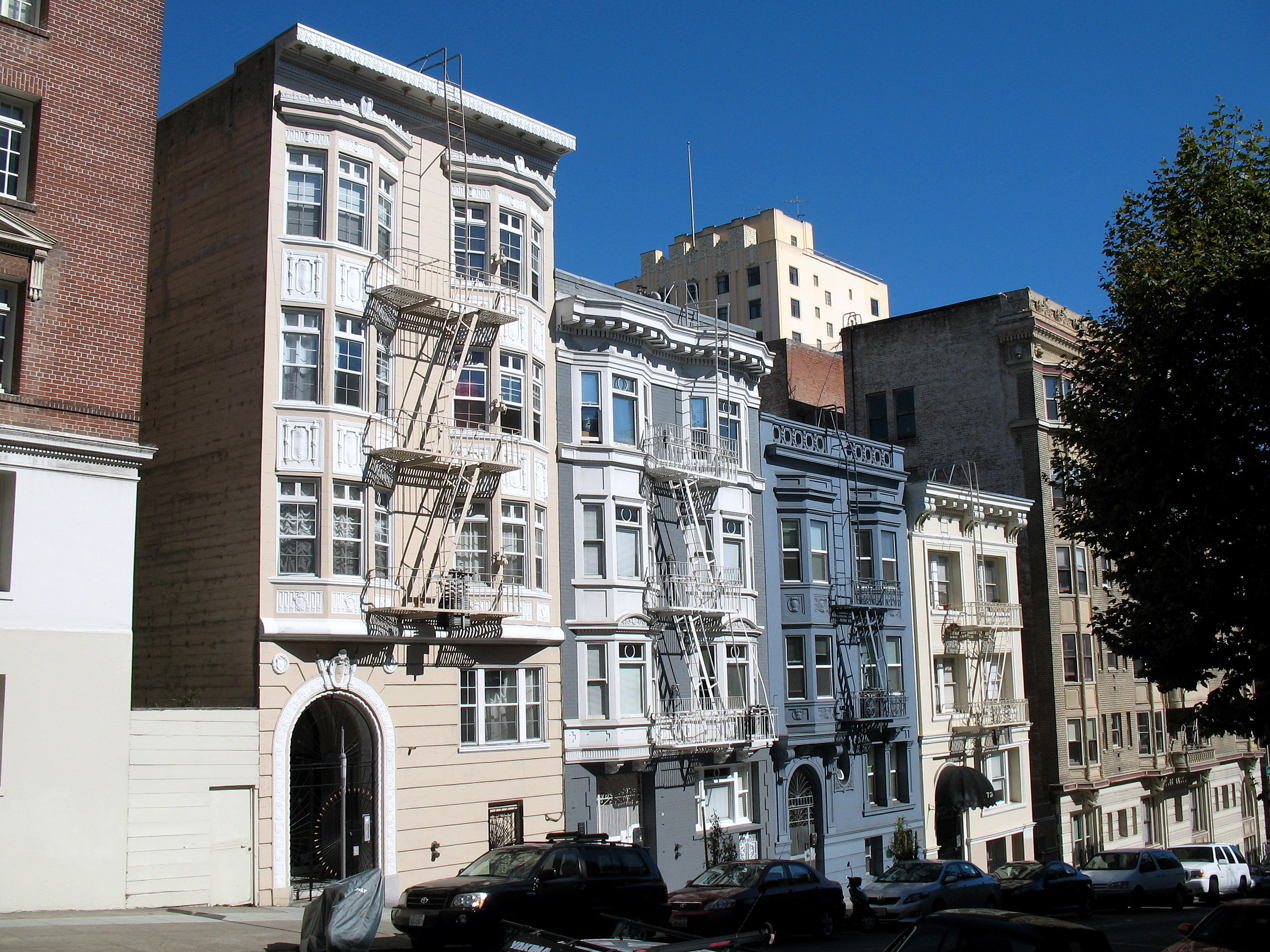
Lower Nob Hill Apartment Hotel Historic District

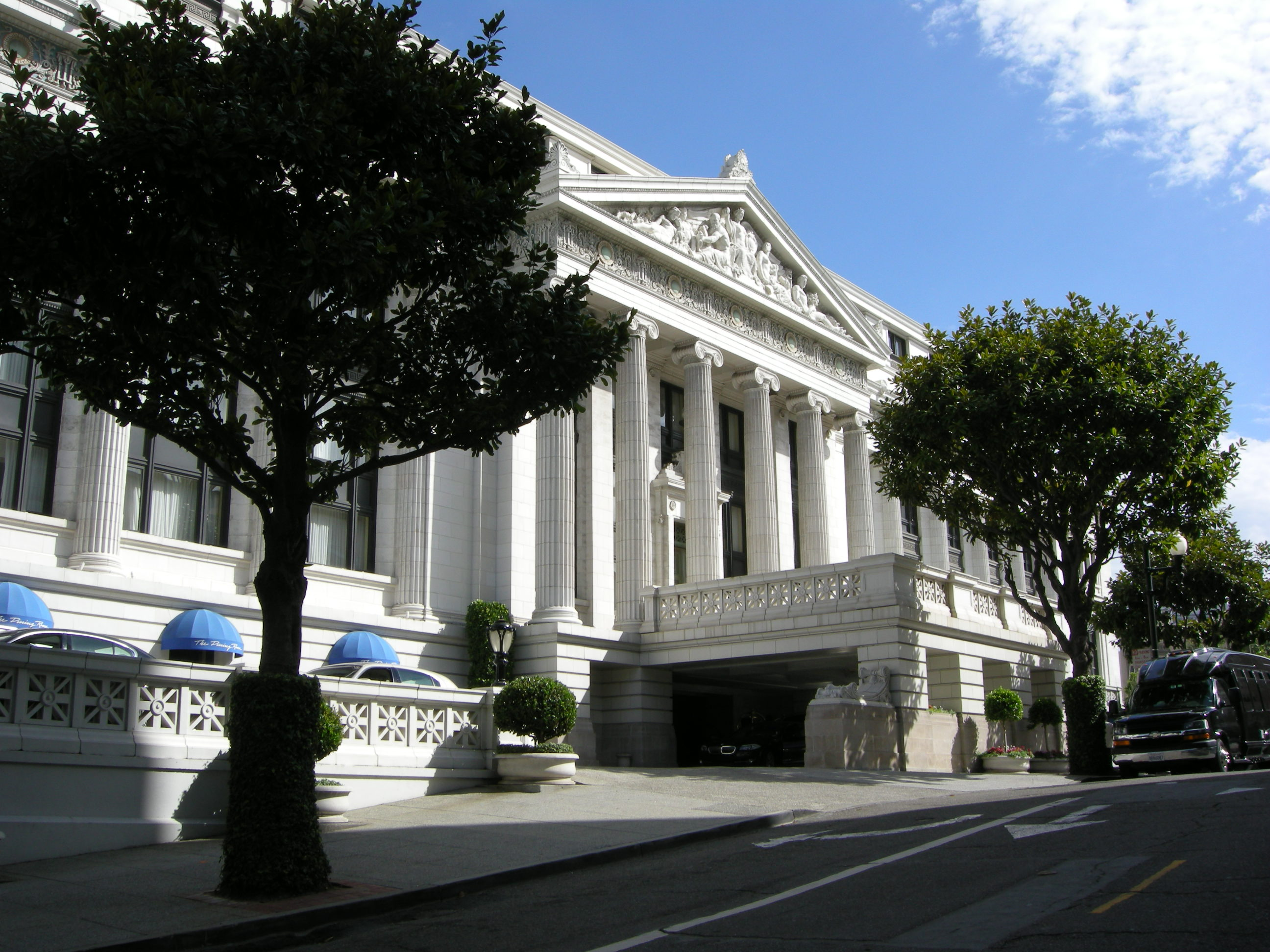
Ritz-Carlton Nob Hill

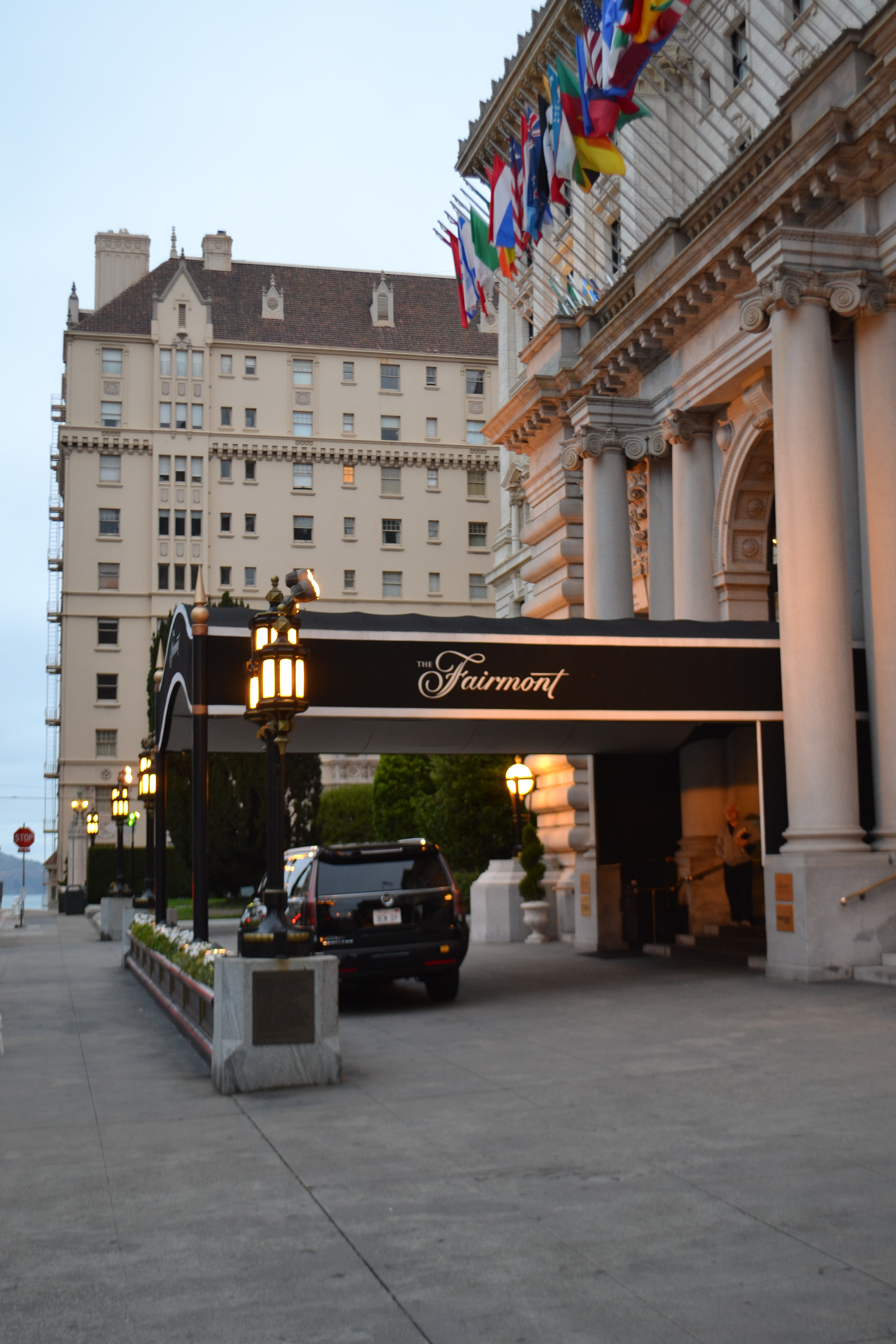
Fairmont San Francisco

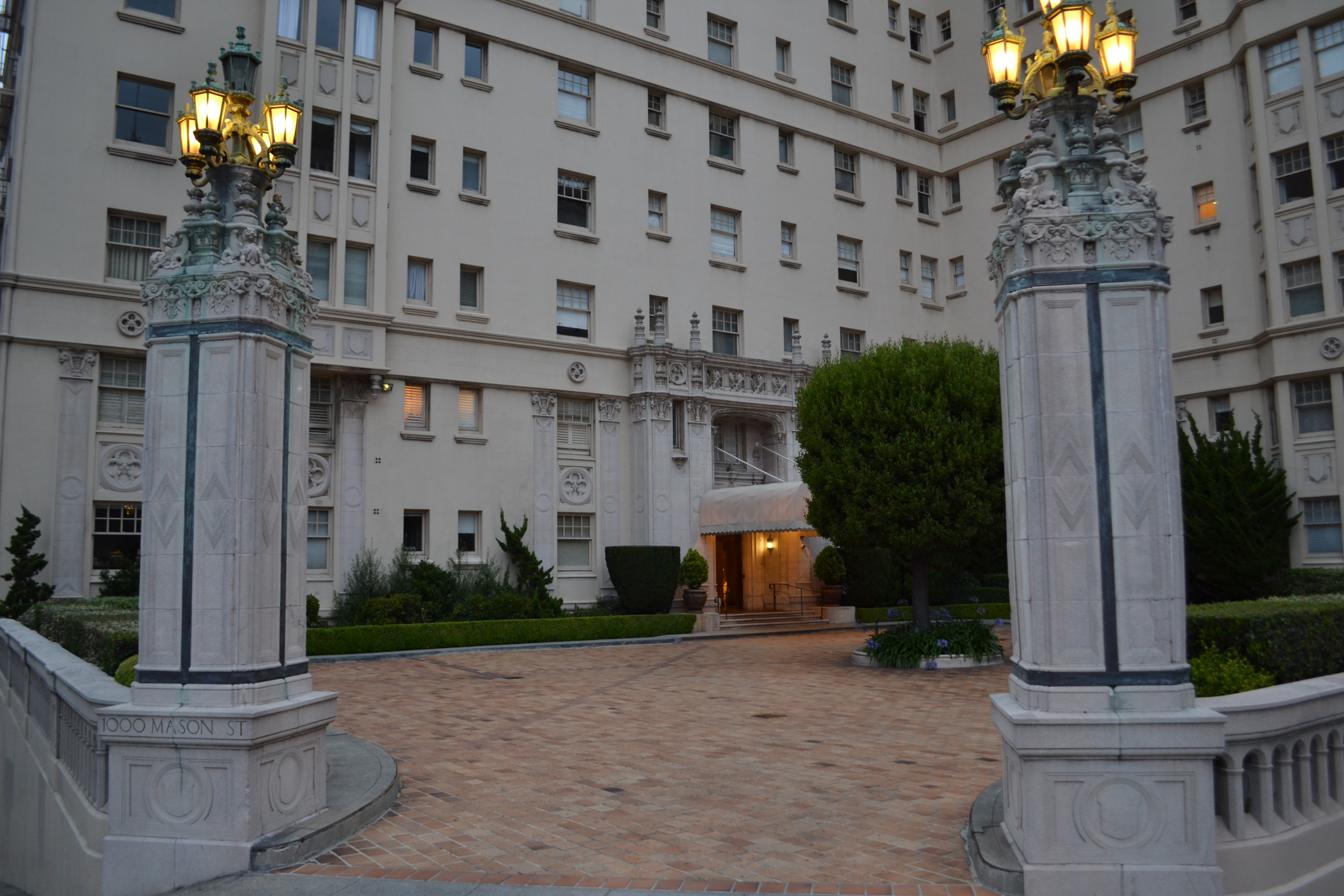
Brockelbank Apartments

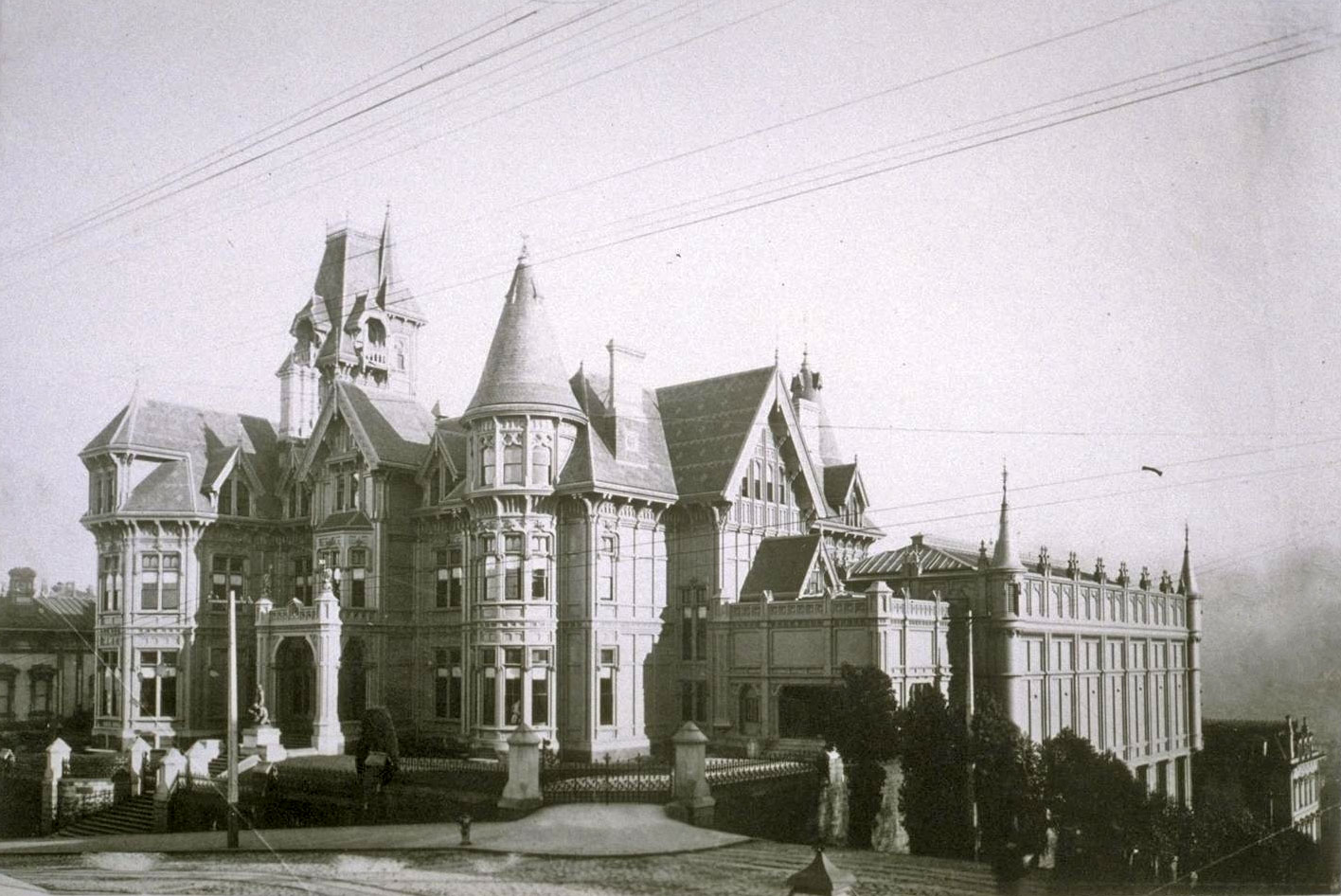
Mark Hopkins mansion.

== See also ==
- List of hills in San Francisco
- Nob Hill Gazette
