= Powell Street =

Street in San Francisco, beginning at Market Street, ending at Fisherman's Wharf

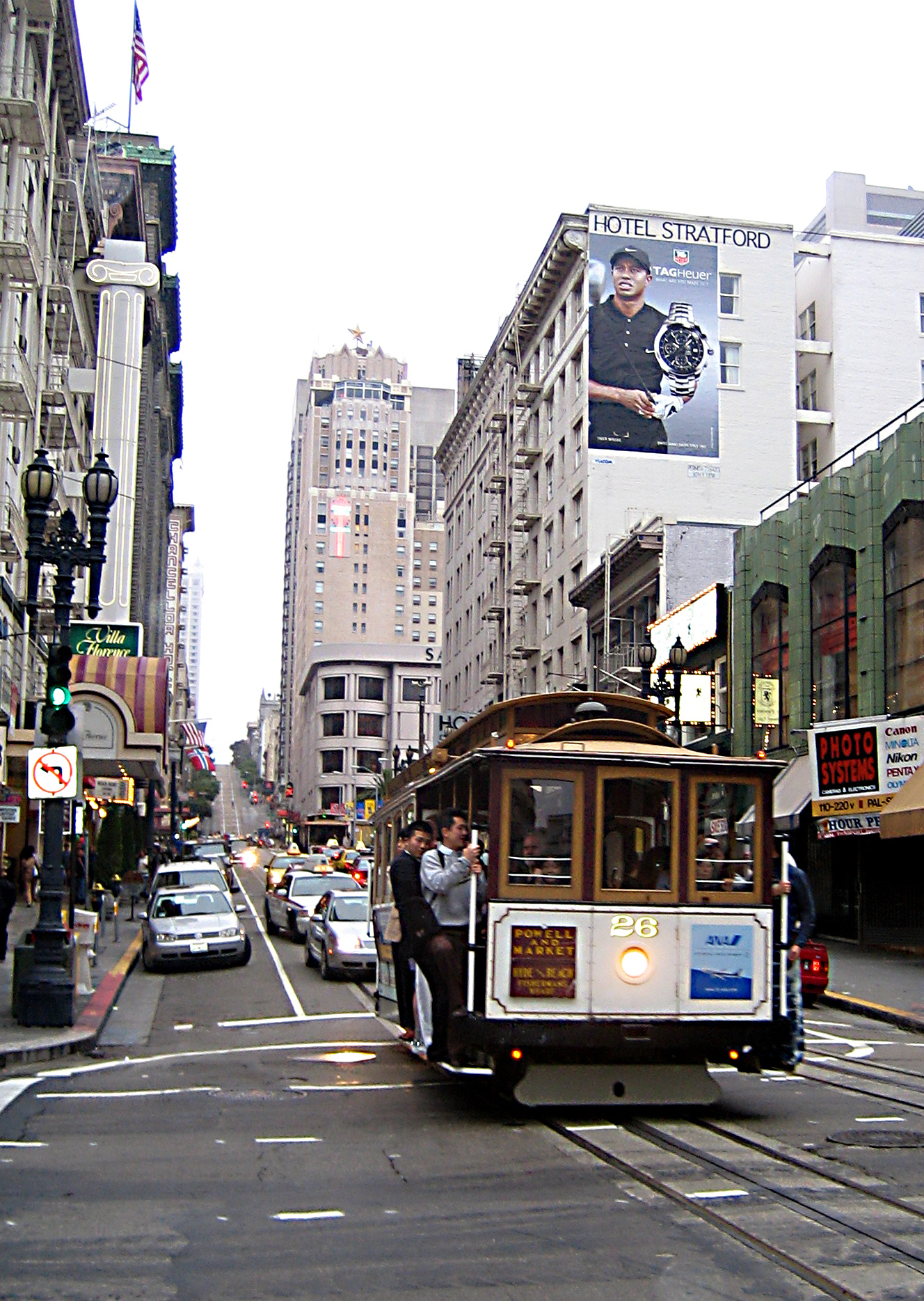
- Powell St
- Namesake: Dr. William J. Powell
- Location: San Francisco
- Nearest metro station: Powell Street station
- South end: Market Street
- North end: The Embarcadero and Jefferson Street at Fisherman's Wharf

Powell Street is a street in San Francisco, California. It connects from Market Street through Union Square, North Beach, Nob Hill, Russian Hill and ends at the Fisherman's Wharf.

The intersection of Powell Street with Market Street is the starting point of the Powell-Hyde Street terminal line of the San Francisco Cable Car. It ends on Hyde Street at the Aquatic Park Historic District.

The street was named for Dr. William J. Powell, surgeon of the U.S. sloop of war Warren, which was active during the conquest of California.
