= Bull Run Invitational Cross Country Meet =

Maryland Public Secondary School cross country invitational

Bull Run Invitational is a Maryland Public Secondary Schools Athletic Association (MPSSAA) sanctioned high school cross country invitational. The race is hosted by Hereford High School on their rural campus in northern Baltimore County. The invitational has become one of the east coast's largest and most popular cross country races, drawing over 125 schools annually and approximately 4500 runners. Features 13 races throughout the day. On the local level, the course has always been known for its challenging nature and slower than average times, but recent national media attention sealed the course's status as one of the top three most challenging cross country courses in the nation.

== History ==
The Hereford High School Cross site was originally designed as a two-mile-long championship cross country course in 1957. Over the years it has been altered and expanded to its current 3 mile length.

The Course record through all divisions was broken in 2026 by Baidy Ba in the reunion race. Baidy had just graduated from Kent State. He clocked a time of 15:05 shattering the previous record. Granted he isn’t in high school and is a sub 4 Miler

== Course ==
The race is run on Hereford High School's rural campus located in the northernmost section of Baltimore County, Parkton, Maryland.

"The "grueling" course is noted for its hills, twists, turns and a steep ravine known as "The Dip", all making for what has been called "The Toughest Three Miles in Cross-Country"

The course starts in a 500-600meter slanted incline and continues for the duration of the race to drive runners through rolling hills and around 90 degree bends.

The backhills: A mile of switchback trail that takes runners through woods and a former cornfield
The Dip: "The dip is the centerpiece of the Hereford strength test. The Dip is a deep ravine in the middle of the course. Runners tackle it twice; first, in the second mile, going down all the way to the bottom, where a small bridge crosses a creek, and then climbing all the way to the top on the other side. Then, after winding uphill, downhill, sidehill through woods and fields, the runners return for another crack at The Dip. Down to the bottom again and back up to the top -- this time with 2.5 miles under their belts."

Even though the course is only 3 miles, only a few boys have broken 16 minutes and few girls have broken 19 minutes. On ordinary courses the winning times can be up to a minute faster. The course is also home to the MD State Meet.

In 2003, after two weeks of postponement due to Hurricane Isabel, the Bull Run Invitational was ultimately canceled after the running of a JV boys race. The unusually rainy weather turned the courses largest hill into an impassable mudslide.

On days with rain, JV races go up a different hill and not the backside of “The Dip” so that they do not mess up course conditions for varsity runners. They go up the spectator and coaches hill which runs right along side the hill, but is more curved around.

== Race divisions ==
The race is divided into a number of divisions based on school size and team ability. There is an unconventional section, the reunion run, for coaches and the general public to compete. Divisions: Maroon Varsity Boys , Maroon Varsity Girls, Gold Varsity Boys, Gold Varsity Girls,Medium Varsity-Boys, Medium Varsity Girls, Small Varsity Boys, Small Varsity Girls, Reunion Run.

== Awards ==
Plaque’s are given to the top fifteen individuals in each race. Numbered ribbons are distributed to 16th-100th place and participant ribbons are given to the rest of the field. Team Awards are given out to the top three scoring teams.

== Media coverage ==
In 2002, the national running website, www.dyestat.com, showcased the Hereford High School course as "the toughest three miles in cross country."

In 2005, the Washington Post newspaper published an article, "Far From All Downhill," highlighting the challenging nature of the infamous Hereford cross country course.

Chasing the Standard records all races each year and takes pictures. They are posted on Instagram and YouTube.
