= Hereford High School (Parkton, Maryland) =

Public school in Maryland, United States

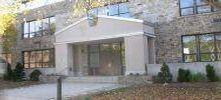

Location
- 17301 York Road; Parkton, Maryland 21120; United States; 39°35′56″N 76°39′36″W

Information
- Type: Public high school
- Established: 1953
- School district: Baltimore County Public Schools
- Principal: Robert Covert
- Teaching staff: 72
- Grades: 9-12
- Enrollment: 1,288 (2024)
- Colors: Maroon, gold, and white
- Nickname: Bulls
- Website: herefordhs.bcps.org

Hereford High School is a public high school located in Parkton, Maryland, United States, and is part of the Baltimore County Public Schools system. Established in 1953, the school serves students in grades 9 through 12 from the Hereford Zone in rural northern Baltimore County.

The Hereford Zone covers approximately 233 square miles (600 km^{2}) and comprises more than one third of Baltimore County by area.

Hereford High School is known for its agriscience program, one of the few agricultural education programs among the county's public high schools. Hereford's base feeder school, Hereford Middle School, located in Monkton, also has a smaller agricultural program.

In 2015, the school was recognized as a National Blue Ribbon School by the United States Department of Education.

== History ==
The Agricultural High School was opened by then rural Baltimore County in Sparks, Maryland in 1909 and had its first graduating class in 1912. The name was changed to Sparks High School around 1920, and it was converted into an elementary school in 1953. Hereford High School was established in nearby Parkton, Maryland to replace Sparks High School in 1953. It originally was home to a large population of farmers' children in northern Baltimore County due to the fact that at one time, Hereford's economy was almost entirely agriculture based. Since then, the disappearance of small farms and the growth of exurban housing development has caused the high school's agrarian roots to be carried on mostly by local tradition and its agricultural courses.

== Academics ==
Hereford High school received a 69.9 out of a possible 90 points (77%) on the 2018-2019 Maryland State Department of Education Report Card and received a 5 out of 5 star rating, ranking in the 88th percentile among all Maryland schools. The Maryland Department of Education certified Hereford High School as a Blue Ribbon School on December 15, 2015.

== Students ==
The 2019–2020 enrollment at Hereford High School was 1295 students.

== Departments ==
=== Music ===
The music programs of Hereford High include the following:

- Concert (freshman), Symphonic (upperclassman), and Chamber (by audition) Orchestra
- Concert Band (freshman) and Wind Ensemble (upperclassman)
- Chorus (men's, women's) (freshmen, upperclassman)
- Chamber Choir (for upperclassmen only)
- "Bulltones" (by audition, male choir)
- "Ladies Faire" (by audition, female choir)
- Jazz Ensemble
- Steel Band
- Guitar
- AP Music Theory
- various music technology courses
- Pep Band (for Basketball and Football games)
- Pit Orchestras (for the Spring musical)

Along with its counterpart female choral group, "Ladies Fare", the "Bulltones" perform at a variety of events, visiting schools in the vicinity as well as competing in notable locations such as Boston, Montreal, and Nashville.

In 2007, the Hereford High School Symphonic Band performed Chorus Angelorum by composer Samuel R. Hazo. The piece was commissioned for the Symphonic Winds section two years prior, after the death of Joey and Audrey Baseman (whose siblings and grandchildren were in the band).

=== Art ===
The National Art Honor Society chapter at H.H.S. provides services such as face-painting for the homecoming dance, sponsorship of Youth Art Month activities, assistance at after-school art programs in the area, a House of Ruth (shelter for abused women) art supply fund, and more. It also hosts the high school's annual art auction and show, which exhibits student work.

=== Theatre ===
Several levels of Theatre classes are available to schedule. The department usually produces two to three shows each school year. Previously, Hereford partook in the Cappies program in the Baltimore area, but left the program in the 2012–2013 season. Members of the theatre program as well as the program as a whole have won a number of awards at the All State Theatre Festival, held annually at Magruder High School in Montgomery County. Because of this continually evolving program, the actors have been able to perform songs on the stage at the landmark Hippodrome Theatre on Eutaw Street in downtown Baltimore. They have also won awards at the yearly trip to the Pennsylvania Renaissance Festival. Other theatre related extracurricular activities include the Improv Troupe and Drama Club.

== Athletics ==
The mascot of Hereford is Brutus the bull, due to the region's rich agrarian history.

Hereford High plays in the state league Maryland Public Secondary Schools Athletic Association (MPSSAA), and has won over 50 state athletic championships, more than any other school in Baltimore County. Hereford has also won the second most state championships in the Baltimore metro area, second only to Oakland Mills High in Columbia, Maryland in neighboring Howard County:

=== State championships ===
Girls Cross Country

- Class B 1978, 1979, 1980
- 2A 2004, 2005, 2013, 2015, 2016, 2017, 2018, 2021
- 3A 2010, 2011, 2015

Boys Cross Country

- Class B 1957, 1958, 1959, 1960, 1962, 1968, 1970, 1971, 1974, 1976, 1977, 1978
- 3A 2010, 2011, 2012
- Class 2A Sportsmanship Awards 2017

Field Hockey

- Class B 1979
- 1A 1998 TIE
- 2A 2001 TIE, 2004, 2006, 2014, 2015, 2016
- 3A 2009

Football

- 1A 1997
- 2A, 2001, 2002

Girls Soccer

- 2A 2000 TIE

Boys Soccer

- 1A 1987 TIE, 1988 TIE
- 2A 1989 TIE, 2013
- Steve Malone Sportsmanship Award 2009

Volleyball

- Combined Class AA/A/B/C 1975
- Class B 1979

Girls Indoor Track

- 3A 2012, 2013
- 2A 2016, 2017, 2019, 2020

Boys Indoor Track

- Class B-C 1980

Wrestling

- Combined Class 1970

Girls Lacrosse

- 2A-1A 2001, 2002, 2003
- Sportsmanship Award 2002

Boys Lacrosse

- 2A-1A 1996, 2003
- 3A-2A-1A 2000
- 3A-2A 2008, 2009, 2010, 2011, 2012, 2013, 2021

Softball

- Eugene Robertson Sportsmanship Award 2004 TIE, 2007

Girls Track and Field

- 2A 2019

=== Cross country ===
Hereford High is the host of the annual Bull Run Invitational Cross Country Meet, run in the end of September, which is one of the largest East Coast cross country running events, attracting over 100 schools from surrounding states. The course is noted for its hills, twists, turns and a steep ravine known as "The Dip", all making for what has been called "The Toughest Three Miles in Cross-Country" by John Dye of DyeStat.

=== Track and field ===
In May 2006, Hereford High School and Eastern Technical High School each initiated an appeal of an initial ruling at the Class 2A state championship in girls' track which led to the disqualification of Paralympic medalist Tatyana McFadden, a wheelchair athlete, and her teammate, Alison Smith, for McFadden's pacing of Smith. The consequential disqualification of McFadden and Smith by the Jury of Appeals of the State Games Committee cost defending champion Atholton High School the title.

== Notable alumni ==
- Jennifer S. Baker, director of athletics and recreation at Johns Hopkins University
- Anthony Casalena, founder of Squarespace
- Andrew DePaola, NFL long snapper and 2x Pro Bowl selection
- Suzanne Stettinius, modern pentathlete who represented the United States at the 2012 Summer Olympics
