= Greater Baltimore Medical Center =

- GBMC Healthcare
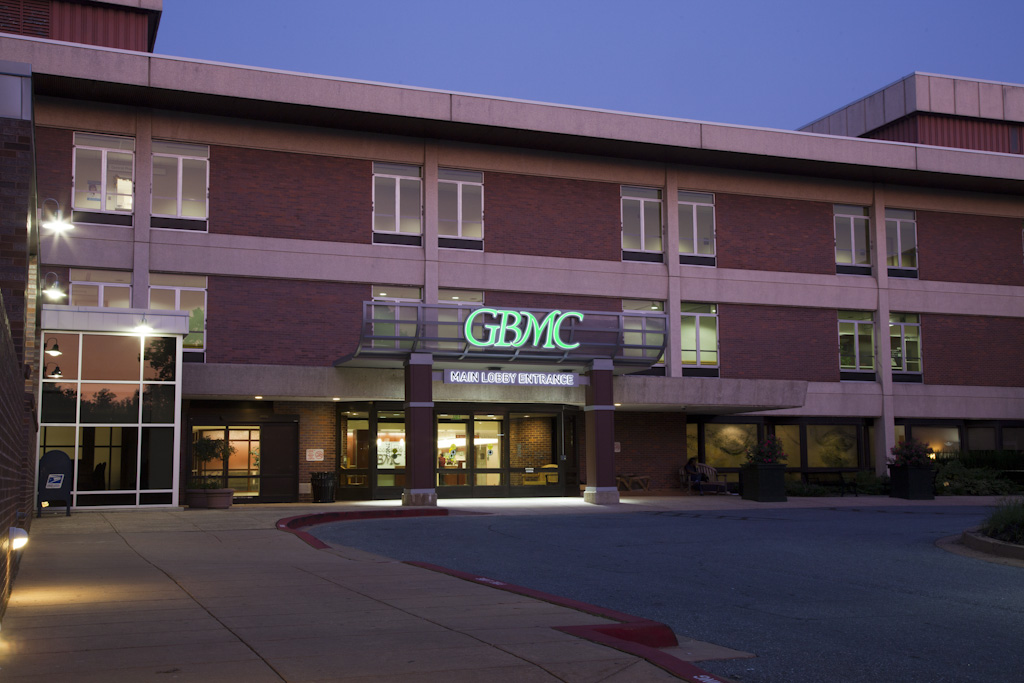
- Main Entrance Prior to 2021

Geography
- Location: 6701 North Charles St. Towson, Maryland, U.S.
- Coordinates: 39.3899°N 76.6194°W

Organisation
- Care system: Community Hospital
- Type: Private, not-for-profit

Services
- Emergency department: Yes
- Beds: 275

History
- Founded: 1965

Links
- Website: www.gbmc.org
- Lists: Hospitals in U.S.

Greater Baltimore Medical Center (GBMC) is a U.S. hospital located in the Baltimore suburb of Towson, Maryland. It was opened in 1965. GBMC serves more than 20,455 inpatient cases and approximately 52,000 emergency department visits annually. GBMC's main campus includes three medical office buildings—Physicians Pavilion East, Physicians Pavilion West, and Physicians Pavilion North I. In addition to its main campus located in Towson, GBMC has several facilities located throughout the community including in Hereford, Hunt Manor, Hunt Valley, Owings Mills, Perry Hall, Lutherville, Phoenix, and Timonium.

GBMC HealthCare is a private, not-for-profit corporation that owns and operates Greater Baltimore Medical Center. GBMC HealthCare also owns and operates Gilchrist Hospice Care (formerly known as Hospice of Baltimore and Gilchrist Center for Hospice Care), the largest not-for-profit hospice organization in the state of Maryland. The organization also includes the GBMC Foundation, which fundraises for GBMC. GBMC is a top 10 rated hospital in Baltimore as well as one of the 40 best employers in Maryland for 2023.

GBMC maintains a collaborative care agreement with Sheppard Pratt, a mental health services facility and system with which it shares adjacency on the Towson campus.

== History ==
Incorporated in 1960, GBMC HealthCare consolidated two specialty Baltimore hospitals: the Hospital for Women of Maryland in Baltimore City and Presbyterian Eye, Ear and Throat Charity Hospital. GBMC opened its doors in 1965 as a regional medical center, providing general acute and specific specialized services to the northern portion of Baltimore City, most of Baltimore County, and portions of Anne Arundel, Carroll, Harford, and Howard counties.

The Hospital for Women of Maryland in Baltimore City had opened in 1882 in Bolton Hill as the second women's hospital in the country (in 2001 the Hospital for Women was repurposed into the Meyerhoff House, a student housing facility for the Maryland Institute College of Art). The Presbyterian Eye, Ear and Throat Charity Hospital originated as a clinic in the Civil War surgeon's East Baltimore carriage house in 1887.

Since moving to Towson from Baltimore City, GBMC has shared adjacency to Towson University.

In 2020, GBMC was granted the Malcolm Baldridge National Quality Award as well as a 5-star rating from the Centers for Medicare and Medicaid Services.

GBMC underwent a major renovation and revitalization construction project starting in 2021 that included 60 new inpatient beds and a new cancer institute.

In March 2025, S&P Global Ratings downgraded the hospital's credit rating from A to A−, citing a string of operating losses. In the 2023 fiscal year, GBMC ran an operating loss of $44 million. A hospital spokeswoman tied the losses to COVID-19, labor costs and inflation and said recent infrastructure investments will help GBMC reverse its fortunes.

== Gilchrist Hospice Care ==
Gilchrist Hospice Care, a Medicare/Medicaid-certified hospice program, is the largest not-for-profit hospice organization in the state of Maryland. Since 1994, it has provided services to over 17,000 terminally ill individuals who reside in Baltimore City and Baltimore, Carroll, Harford, and Howard counties. Services include medical, nursing, social work, home health aid, spiritual and bereavement counseling/support, and volunteer assistance. Hospice services are most often provided in the patient's home. When more intensive medical care is required, there are inpatient hospice facilities in three locations:

- Towson - located on the campus of GBMC
- Columbia - 10 bed unit in Howard County
- Baltimore - adult and pediatric inpatient units located on site of the former Memorial Stadium

== GBMC Foundation ==
Founded in 1987, the GBMC Foundation is a 501(c)(3) nonprofit organization established to centralize and coordinate fundraising efforts to benefit GBMC HealthCare. The Foundation executes fundraising events, annual appeals, and capital campaigns and seeks gifts from patients, as well as grants from corporations and private foundations. The Foundation does not have any affiliation with federated funds or public agencies. The GBMC Foundation is registered with the state of Maryland as an approved charitable organization. Gifts to the GBMC Foundation support new facilities, equipment for GBMC physicians and staff, specialty programs, and technologies that combine to make GBMC the community hospital of choice for residents of Central Maryland.

== Johns Hopkins medicine affiliation ==
In 2007, GBMC and Johns Hopkins Medicine began a strategic clinical affiliation for several programs, beginning with cardiology, pediatric surgery, and oncology. Additional joint clinical practices, shared satellite healthcare centers, and collaboration on clinical research are possibilities for future expansion of this affiliation.

== 2020 Cyberattack ==
In late 2020, GBMC was targeted by a ransomware attack that left much of the health system isolated as information technology systems were taken offline to prevent unauthorized access to data. This attack followed many similar incidents among healthcare facilities and systems across the United States.
