= First Avenue Middle School =

School in Arcadia, California, US

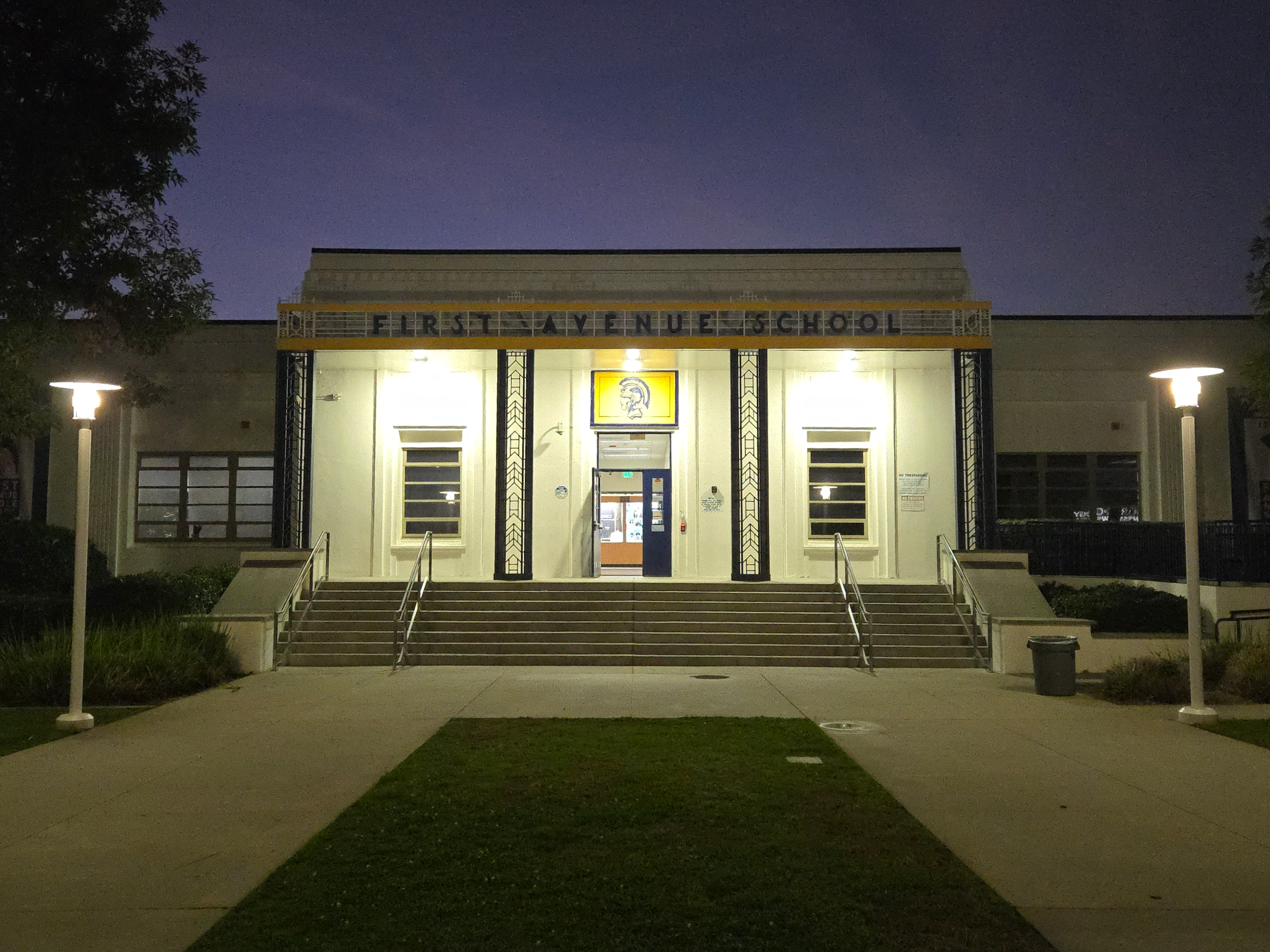
- Main entrance of First Avenue Middle School

Location
- 301 South First Avenue; Arcadia, Los Angeles County, California 91006; United States; 34°08′12″N 118°01′47″W

Information
- Former name: Arcadia Grammar School; First Avenue School; First Avenue Jr. High School
- School type: Public
- Motto: 'Let's Go, Spartans!'
- Opened: 1907
- Status: Operational
- School district: Arcadia Unified School District
- NCES District ID: 0602970
- NCES School ID: 060297000228
- Principal: Adam Eslami
- Grades: 6-8
- Student to teacher ratio: 23:1
- Mascot: Spartan
- Website: fa.ausd.net

First Avenue Middle School is a public middle school in Arcadia, California, United States. The school is a three-year program and teaches grades 6 to 8, although it had previously accounted for grades 9 to 12 as well. The school is part of the Arcadia Unified School District, along with two other middle schools. Students who graduate from First Avenue Middle School often continue their studies at Arcadia High School.

First Avenue Middle School was the first ever learning center to be opened within the city of Arcadia, first opening in 1907 as a schoolhouse. In 2024, First Avenue Middle School was recognized as a California Distinguished School by the California Department of Education. First Avenue Middle School also has a GreatSchools rating of 8 out of 10.

== History ==
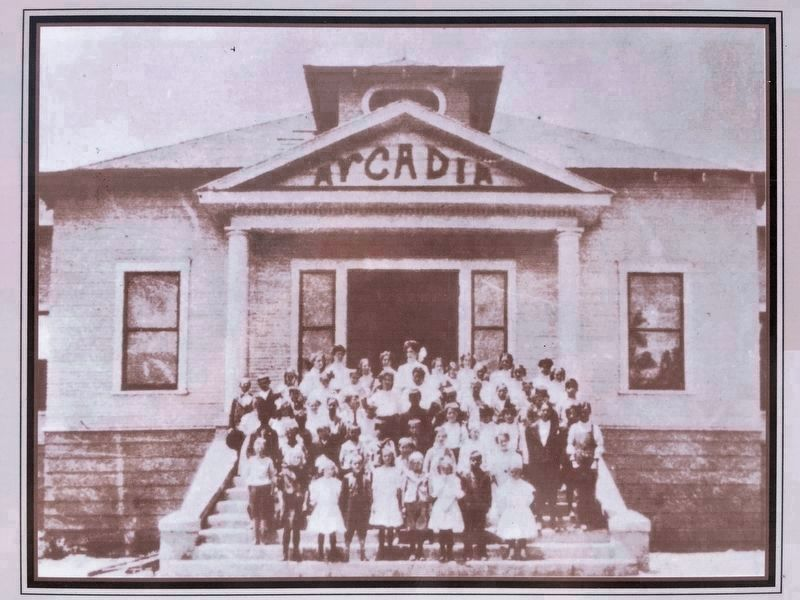
Arcadia Grammar School, 1907

In 1907, the original First Avenue schoolhouse, originally named as "Arcadia Grammar School", was built on the southwest corner of First Avenue and California Street. This schoolhouse had replaced temporary buildings, including a vacant saloon, which were used since Arcadia was incorporated in 1903. Originally, the schoolhouse consisted of two classrooms, each containing a teacher, which had grades 1-4 in one class, and 5-8 in another.

With the increasing population of Arcadia, the school made major expansions in 1919, which consisted of a building with eight classrooms, a library, and an assembly hall. The original school also consisted of a swimming pool. Other major expansions of the school were made in 1921 and 1939.

In 1933, in the aftermath of the Long Beach Earthquake, the school, now named, "First Avenue School", was severely damaged, and was in need of major reconstruction. Because the earthquake took place outside of school hours, no lives were recorded to be lost.

=== 1979 Fire ===
On May 28, 1979, a catastrophic fire was set ablaze within First Avenue Middle School, thus destroying the entire complex. Since the fire taking place on Memorial Day, being a federal holiday, no deaths occurred from the incident. Due to the fire, First Avenue Middle School suffered over $1 million in damages. Students who attended First Avenue at the time were sent to finish off the school year at Foothills Middle School or Richard Henry Dana Middle School.

Suspicions hinted towards the actions of unidentified arsonists that caused the fire to start. After investigations were made on the incident, it was ultimately determined that the fire was caused by an act of arson.

== Academic overview ==
As of 2025, First Avenue Middle School is recorded to have a total of 679 students, of who which 62% scored over the proficient level of mathematics, while 77% scored over the proficient level of reading. Although having a worse overall math score than other schools within its district, both math and reading scores are above the average percentile of students in California overall.

First Avenue is ranked #2-3 in overall academic performance within the Arcadia Unified School District, while it ranks #122 in California Middle Schools academically.

=== Population ===
The student population is close to half-and-half, with 48% of the students being female, while 52% are male. Majority of the student population are part of the minority group, making up 92% of the students who attend First Avenue. Over half of the students descend from Asian or Pacific Islander origin.

== Renovations and changes ==
In 1933, the school was reconstructed after the Long Beach Earthquake had hit southern California.

In the aftermath of the 1979 First Avenue Middle School fire, almost the entire building complex was destroyed. Although plans were discussed to demolish the building, many citizens suggested for its total reconstruction, which went through. The school would reopen on July 1, 1980, where it still remains in operation to this day.

In 1998, an elective-like program named the “Exploratory Wheel”, was added to First Avenue’s sixth grade curriculum as a way to provide students an idea of what electives they were interested in for future grades.

In 2019, the American television series Trading Spaces came to First Avenue Middle School and Holly Avenue Elementary School to completely renovate the teacher lounges.

In late 2025, the school added the addition of solar panels to the field.

New renovations on portable classes expected to be finished by 2030

== Accomplishments ==
In 2019, Karalee Nakatsuka, a history teacher for First Avenue Middle School, was officially declared as the 2019 California History Teacher of the Year, who had taught within the Arcadia Unified School District for over 30 years. As of late 2025, Ms. Nakatsuka is seen to still be teaching at First Avenue.

First Avenue Middle School has won four California Distinguished Schools awards from the California Department of Education; once in 1990, two more times in 1992 and 1996, and most recently in 2024.
