= Andrew DePaola =

American football player (born 1987)

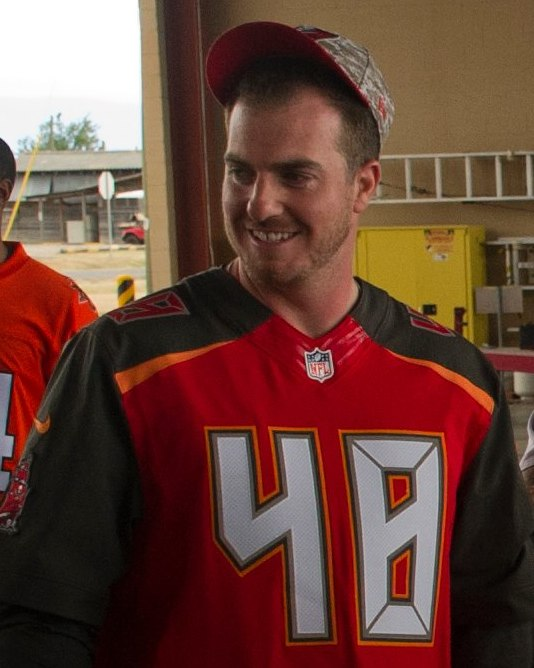
- DePaola with the Tampa Bay Buccaneers in 2016

No. 42 – Minnesota Vikings
- Position: Long snapper
- Roster status: Active

Personal information
- Born: July 28, 1987 (age 39); Parkton, Maryland, U.S.
- Listed height: 6 ft 1 in (1.85 m)
- Listed weight: 227 lb (103 kg)

Career information
- High school: Hereford (Parkton)
- College: Rutgers (2005–2009)
- NFL draft: 2010: undrafted

Career history
- Tampa Bay Buccaneers (2012–2016); Chicago Bears (2017); Oakland Raiders (2018); Carolina Panthers (2019)*; Minnesota Vikings (2020–present)
- * Offseason or practice squad member only

Awards and highlights
- 2× First-team All-Pro (2022, 2024); 2× Second-team All-Pro (2023, 2025); 3× Pro Bowl (2022–2024)

Career NFL statistics as of Week 10, 2026
- Games played: 162
- Total tackles: 25
- Fumble recoveries: 1
- Stats at Pro Football Reference

Andrew DePaola Jr. (dee-PAW-lə; born July 28, 1987) is an American professional football long snapper for the Minnesota Vikings of the National Football League (NFL). He made his NFL debut with the Tampa Bay Buccaneers on September 7, 2014. He played football and baseball in high school before playing college football for the Rutgers Scarlet Knights. He has also played in the NFL for the Chicago Bears, Oakland Raiders, and Carolina Panthers.

== Early life and college ==
DePaola was born in Sparks, Maryland, a town in Baltimore County. In 2001, DePaola entered Hereford High School in Parkton, Maryland, as a freshman with a passion for baseball, but soon shifted his focus to football. DePaola quickly became an integral part of the school's football team, the Bulls, and was promoted to the varsity squad his sophomore year. That same year, DePaola helped the Bulls win the 2A state championship in football. DePaola's success continued into his senior year, in which he again led the football team to the state championship but ultimately lost. As the team's quarterback, DePaola completed his senior year completing 68% of his passes, throwing 22 touchdowns, 2,092 passing yards, and allowing only 7 interceptions, leading his team to set a state record for single season scoring of 636 points. In addition to receiving the Baltimore County Offensive Player of the Year award from The Baltimore Sun, DePaola also received honors as an all-Metro and All-State player. The last football game DePaola would play during his high school career would be the Good Samaritan Bowl hosted at the Navy–Marine Corps Memorial Stadium in Annapolis, Maryland. While DePaola did make football his athletic focus during his high school career, he continued to play baseball earning all-Metro honors his senior year after batting .527 and posting a 3–1 record as a pitcher.

After high school, DePaola went on to Rutgers University and joined the football team as a walk-on. His first year, DePaola was redshirted, a technique in player management for college sports in which students may practice with the team while attending classes, but not play in any games. During his first two seasons on the team, including his redshirt season, DePaola served as the team's third string quarterback, helping the team prepare for games during practices. DePaola served as the team's holder on field goals during his third season, not once dropping the ball. It was during this season in 2007 when DePaola was featured on ESPN SportsCenter for a play in which DePaola received the ball for a field goal against the then #2 Ranked University of South Florida, but instead completed a fifteen-yard pass for a touchdown. DePaola began his fourth season with Rutgers as a wide receiver, but became the team's long snapper when the starting long snapper Jeremy Branch sustained a leg injury. During the final four games of that season and for the entirety of his fifth season, DePaola served as the team's starting long snapper, playing in every game that final season. DePaola went undrafted by a professional team after completing college.

== Professional career ==
Pre-draft measurables
Height	Weight	40-yard dash	10-yard split	20-yard split	20-yard shuttle	Three-cone drill	Vertical jump	Broad jump	Bench press
6 ft 0 5/8 in (1.84 m)	215 lb (98 kg)	4.72 s	1.67 s	2.68 s	4.28 s	6.88 s	33.0 in (0.84 m)	9 ft 1 in (2.77 m)	20 reps
All values from Pro Day

=== Tampa Bay Buccaneers ===
DePaola was not immediately signed after college, and he would spend the next two years after graduation working as a bartender and other odd jobs before he'd get his break on an NFL roster. DePaola first signed with the Tampa Bay Buccaneers as an undrafted free agent in early August 2012 during training camp, but after three weeks he was waived on August 27, 2012. On Thursday January 3, 2013, DePaola was signed to a future contract by the Buccaneers, meaning that at the start of the upcoming season DePaola would sign with the Buccaneers and be added to the active roster. DePaola was one of the final cuts in training camp in favor of long snapper Andrew Economos. DePaola secured a starting role on May 14, 2014, signing full-time with the Buccaneers under a two-year contract. DePaola made his on-field debut against the Carolina Panthers on September 7, 2014, with two snaps on successful extra point attempts and one tackle assist. He went on to be the long snapper for the Buccaneers for three seasons from 2014 to 2016.

On August 22, 2017, DePaola re-signed with the Buccaneers, only to be released on September 1, 2017, during final roster cuts.

=== Chicago Bears ===
On September 3, 2017, DePaola was claimed off waivers by the Chicago Bears.

=== Oakland Raiders ===
On March 16, 2018, DePaola signed a four-year contract with the Oakland Raiders. In Week 1, DePaola suffered a torn ACL and was placed on injured reserve on September 12, 2018.

On August 25, 2019, DePaola was released by the Raiders.

=== Carolina Panthers ===
On August 28, 2019, DePaola was signed by the Carolina Panthers. He was released during final roster cuts on August 30, 2019.

After sitting out the 2019 NFL season, DePaola had a tryout with the Houston Texans on August 20, 2020.

=== Minnesota Vikings ===
On November 21, 2020, DePaola was signed to the practice squad of the Minnesota Vikings. He was elevated to the active roster on November 21 and November 28 for the team's weeks 11 and 12 games against the Dallas Cowboys and Panthers, and reverted to the practice squad after each game. He was promoted to the active roster on December 2, 2020. DePaola earned both a Pro Bowl selection and first-team All-Pro nomination as long snapper with the Vikings for the 2022 season.

On March 14, 2023, DePaola signed a three-year contract extension with the Vikings. He was awarded his second consecutive Pro Bowl selection and a second-team All-Pro nomination for the 2023 season.

On November 4, 2024, it was announced that DePaola would undergo surgery to repair a hand injury. Despite a shortened season, DePaola was named first-team All-Pro and earned Pro Bowl honors once again, becoming the first long snapper to earn three consecutive Pro Bowl selections.

On March 10, 2026, DePaola re-signed with the Vikings on a one-year, $1.725 million contract.
