= Renée Chen =

Renee Chen
- 陳嘉唯
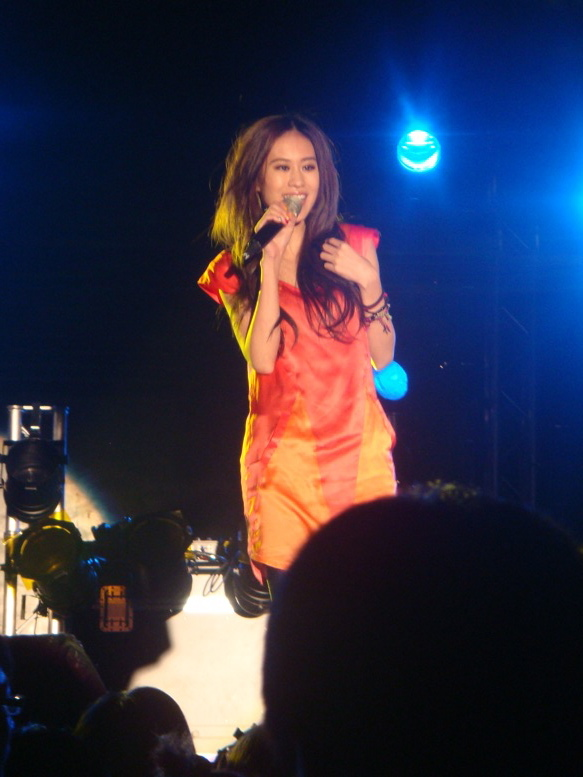
- Born: 2 July 1985 (age 41); Taipei, Taiwan
- Occupations: Singer, songwriter
- Years active: 2003–present

Chinese name
- Traditional Chinese: 陳嘉唯
- Simplified Chinese: 陈嘉唯
Transcriptions
Standard Mandarin
- Hanyu Pinyin: Chén Jiāwéi
- Musical career
- Origin: Taiwan
- Genres: Pop, hip hop, soul, R&B
- Instrument: Piano / cello / guitar / drums
- Labels: Warner Music (2003–2008); Sony Music Entertainment/Sony BMG (2008–present)

Renee "Jia-Wei" Chen (Traditional Chinese: 陳嘉唯; born 2 July 1985) is a Taiwanese singer and songwriter. Renee first gained recognition when she won fourth place in the 2001 New Talent Singing Awards. Although she ultimately did not win the competition, record companies noticed that Renee's voice stood out aside from being the only contestant to sing, dance and choreograph her own performance with fellow stage performers. Given her young age (15 at the time) combined with an evident talent for performing, an artist management agency approached her the following day with a contract, which eventually led to her debut release, through Warner Music in November 2003.

Renee's music has been influenced by genres ranging from pop, hip-hop, soul, and R'n'B. She is renowned for her East-meets-West style and mostly known for her third single, which continues to be a popular selection at KTV venues and singing competitions. In November 2008, after a five-year absence, Renee released her long-awaited second album titled, which simultaneously ended an idol-like era in her career and opened new doors for her as an individual artist.

Renee currently resides in Taipei, Taiwan and tours throughout Asia. Aside from her musical endeavors, she is an active online community member through websites like YouTube, Facebook, Twitter and Pixnet, which hosts her weekly radio show. She is also a vegetarian and a spokesperson for animal rights in Taiwan.

== Early life ==
Born in Taipei, Renee is the youngest of two children. She has one elder brother, Gary, who is also a musician. Her parents divorced when she was young, and Renee moved at the age of five with her mother and brother to Los Angeles. She went through school while experimenting with her singing voice, and followed her passion for music by entering several local singing contests. She attended Arcadia High School in Arcadia, California. Later on during her junior year, Renee was scouted by an artist management agency after placing fourth in the 2001 New Talent Singing Awards. Following negotiations with her mother, she made the ultimate decision to drop out of Arcadia High and committed to preparing for her debut, as proposed by her management, under the condition that also required her to attend home school, which is how she eventually obtained her high school degree at the age of seventeen.

== Album debut ==
Renee moved to Taiwan in 2002 which proved to be a unique experience after being away for 12 years. Her company arranged a rigorous training schedule which she followed for one year before her debut. She was forced to sleep in the management conference room for over a year before earning enough money to pay for her own apartment. She was often asked to perform background harmonies and choreograph dance routines for fellow artists.

Renee eventually signed a record deal with Warner Music. She made her debut on November 6, 2003, with "Who's Renee". To accompany her debut were endorsements with Far East Tone, a major phone carrier in Taiwan, which launched a campaign together with her first single, "Feel Good". Her debut received critical acclaim and Warner Music continued to release singles from the album, attracting endorsements from Nike, DaDa, Niessing Jewelry, Kiehl's and many others including collaborations with the Department of Public Transportation. Her first public performance was at the Beijing Warner Music 10th anniversary concert in front 80,000 people. "Who's Renee" was an up-tempo, Hip-Hop/RnB album that displayed Renee's versatility both as a singer and dancer, but also helped introduce a new generation of westernized pop to the Chinese market. Renee was nominated for Best New Artist in the 2004 Golden Melody Awards, the youngest artist (18 years old) in the history of the awards to be nominated in that category, which was won by JJ Lin.

== Absence and Comeback ==
Following the success of "Who's Renee", her management quickly arranged for a second release. This sparked a difference in opinion between Renee and her company on the direction of her music career. Although the album was eventually completed, it was never released and Renee returned to Los Angeles to wait the remainder of her contract, ending the relationship with both Warner Music and her management.

Following a 3-year absence, Renee returned to Taiwan in 2006 to restart her music career. She appeared as a guest in Leehom Wang's music video "Cockney Girl" which caught the attention of Sony Music Entertainment. Sony executives later arranged for a meeting where she revealed over forty demos compiled over the course of her absence. They immediately drafted a contract and signed her on the same day.

"Miracle" was released on November 6, 2008, which was also the 5th anniversary to the release of "Who's Renee". It was met with mostly positive reviews and ultimately helped revive her image as a capable artist. Far East Tone launched a follow-up campaign together with her first single from the album "愛的奇蹟" which was followed by "幸福導航" and "Shopping" with much fanfare.

== Discography ==
Warner Music releases

- November 2003: "Who's Renee"
- January 2004: Warner 10th Anniversary Concert (CD+DVD)
- October 2004: "鬥魚 II" Original Soundtrack
- August 2007: "幸福的天空" (VA)

Sony Music releases

- November 2008: "Miracle"
