= Suzanne Stettinius =

American modern pentathlete (born 1988)

Personal information
- Born: January 22, 1988 (age 38) Virginia Beach, Virginia, U.S.
- Height: 5 ft 10 in (1.78 m)
- Weight: 134 lb (61 kg)

Sport
- Country: United States
- Sport: Modern Pentathlon
- Coached by: Jeff Hiestand

Suzanne Stettinius (born January 22, 1988, in Virginia Beach, Virginia) is an American modern pentathlete, who represented the United States at the 2012 Summer Olympics in the modern pentathlon.

== Education ==
Stettinius attended Hereford High School in Parkton, Maryland. Stettinius graduated from McDaniel College in Westminster, Maryland, after spending one year at Bethany College in Bethany, West Virginia.

== National and international competition ==
Stettinius earned a silver medal at the NORCECA (North and Central America and Caribbean) Open that functioned as the Olympic qualifying event. Stettinius was awarded her spot in the Olympics when the UIPM announced the 2nd Round Olympic Allocations. Stettinius took seventh in the modern pentathlon of the 2011 Pan American Games, won the 2011 NORCECA Championships, finished 2nd at the 2009 NORCECA Championships, and is a two-time national runner-up.
