= Prettyboy Reservoir =

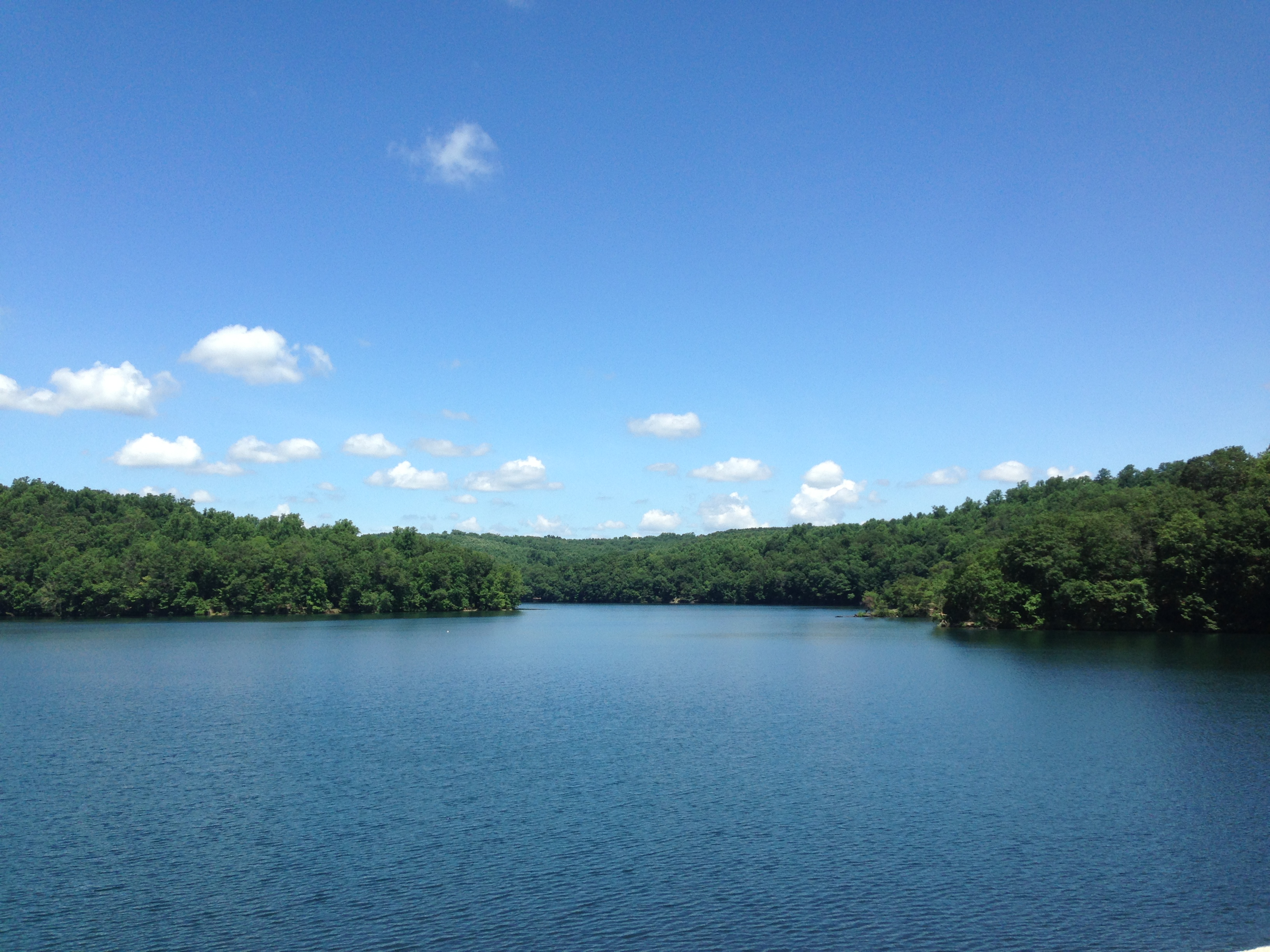

- Location within Maryland Location within the United States
- Location: Baltimore County, Maryland
- Coordinates: 39°38′36″N 76°44′27″W
- Type: reservoir
- Primary inflows: Gunpowder River
- Primary outflows: Loch Raven Reservoir
- Basin countries: United States
- Surface area: 1,500 acres (610 ha)
- Average depth: 29 ft (8.8 m)
- Max. depth: 128.6 ft (39.2 m)
- Water volume: 19 billion US gallons (72 hm^{3})
- Surface elevation: 518 ft (158 m)

Prettyboy Reservoir is a 1,500-acre (610 ha) reservoir in the Hereford Zone of northern Baltimore County, Maryland. While the reservoir is in Baltimore County, the independent city of Baltimore owns the reservoir and the surrounding land. The reservoir is one of three reservoirs created to supply the municipal water system for Baltimore City, Baltimore County, and northern Anne Arundel County constructed by the Baltimore City Department of Public Works. Prettyboy Reservoir, along with Loch Raven Reservoir further down the Big Gunpowder Falls, provide about 61% of the drinking water for the Baltimore metropolitan area system; for this reason, the Prettyboy is considered a "source water" or drinking water watershed. The reservoir contains about 19 billion US gallons (72,000,000 m^{3}) of water on average.

The water from Prettyboy Reservoir is transferred to Loch Raven via Gunpowder Falls rather than directly to Baltimore. It is then transferred via tunnel from Loch Raven to the Montebello Filtration Plants in Baltimore for treatment and distribution. Prettyboy Dam, completed in 1932, impounds the Gunpowder Falls to create the Reservoir. The dam has a spillway crest elevation of 520 ft (160 m) above mean sea level and covers about 1,500 acres (6.1 km^{2}).

According to tradition, the reservoir was named after a settler's horse, Pretty Boy, who drowned in a nearby creek.

Parts of the Gunpowder River watershed also serve as Gunpowder Falls State Park. The reservoir area serves as land for hiking, mountain biking, road cycling, fishing, and boating. Hunting is also permitted, though limited to archery with a special permit. Swimming in the reservoir is prohibited. Sport bike riders and sports car enthusiasts also use the roads in the parklands that surround the reservoir.

Kayak and tubing enthusiasts float or paddle the Lower Gunpowder Falls from the dam down to Falls Road or Masemore Road. The river between those two points contains mainly Flatwater to class II rapids, but one section contains a class III when the water level is normal or higher. Heavy spring rains mean that both gates at the dam may be opened to allow excess water through. Increased water levels make for excellent kayaking because of the narrow width of Gunpowder Falls' valley.

Officers of the Special Department of Public Works, and occasionally Baltimore Police Department officers, patrol all three of the metropolitan area's watersheds.

On June 23, 2008, Prettyboy Reservoir became the site of the first rescue performed by the Baltimore County Fire Department using a helicopter with rescuers dangling from a rope. The victim was a 30-year-old woman who had injured herself while walking her dog. The department had just been trained in the rescue two weeks prior to the incident.

== Gallery ==
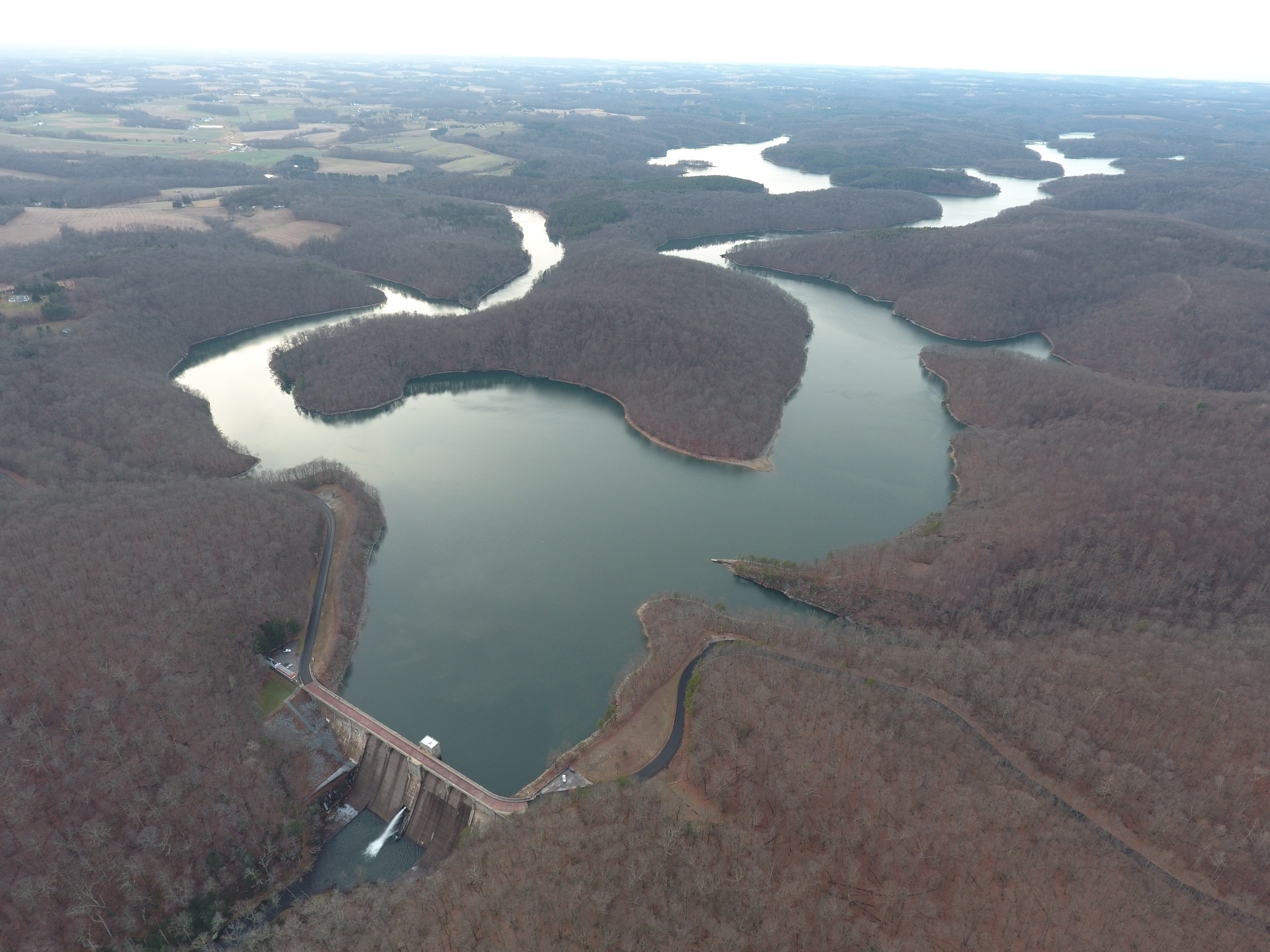
Aerial view

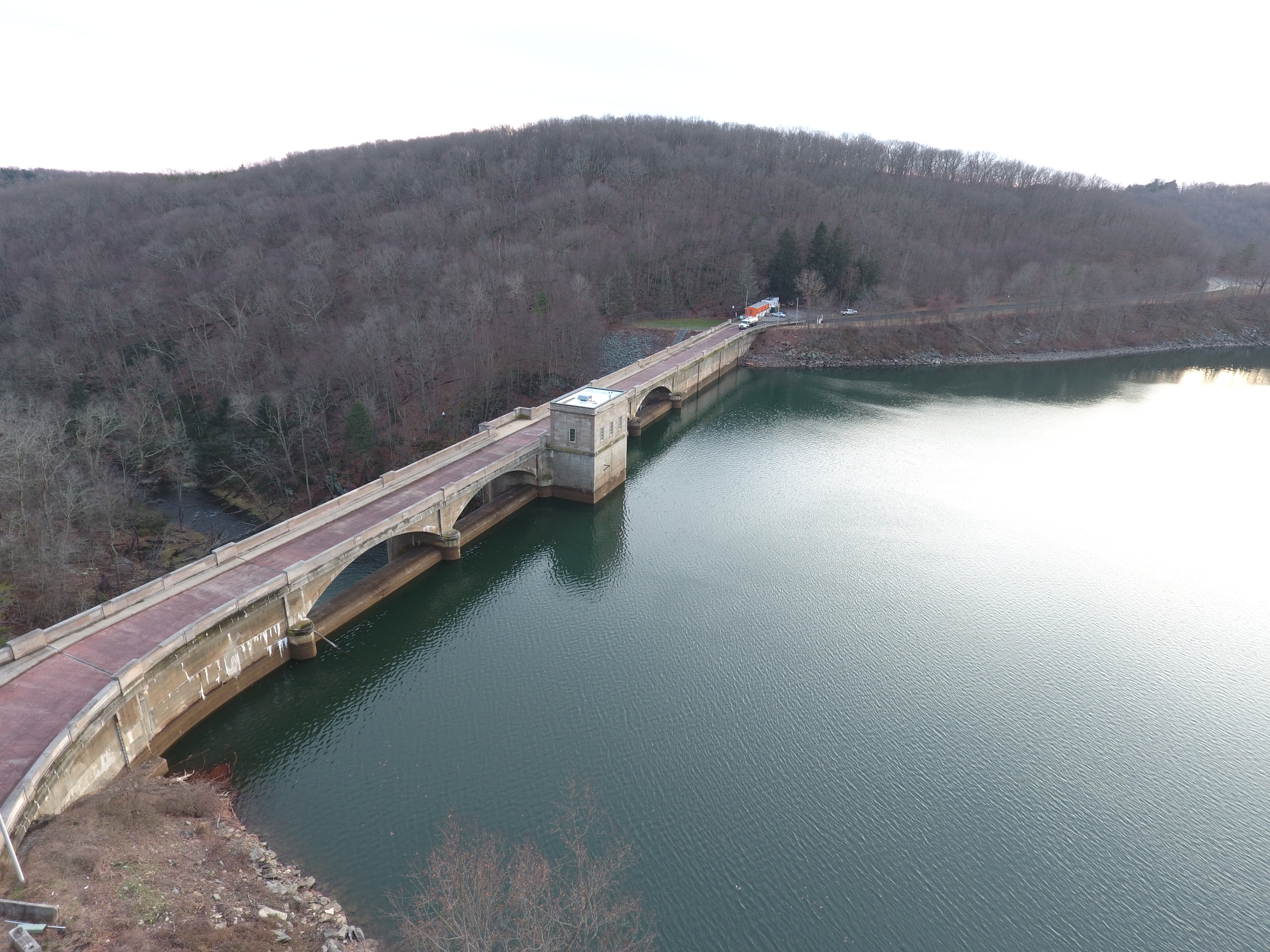
Prettyboy Dam

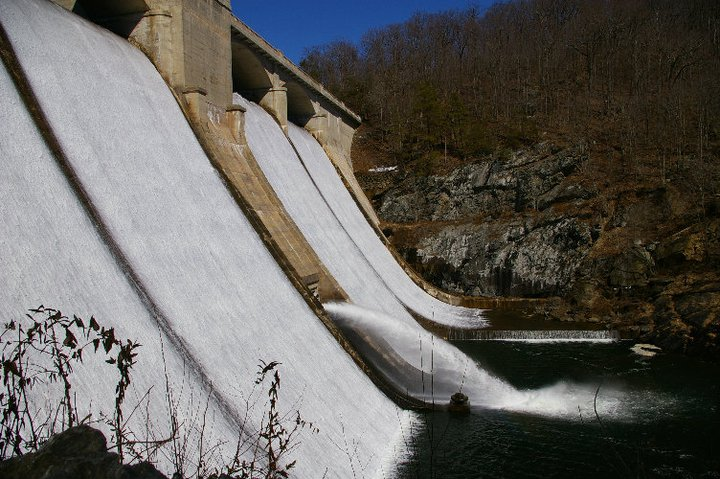
Dam spillway

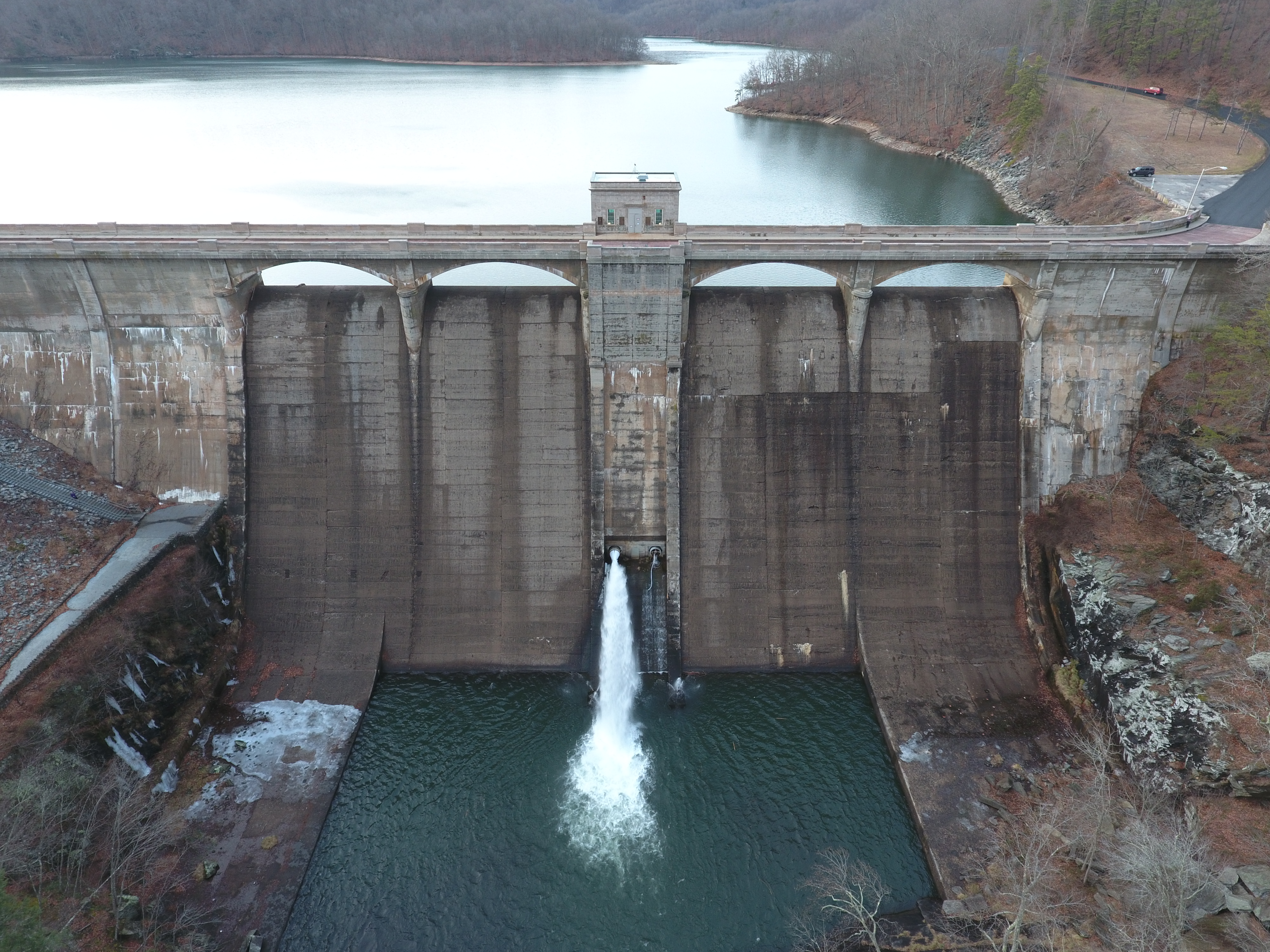
Prettyboy Dam
