= Doug Speck =

Douglas Gary Speck (October 16, 1947 – March 4, 2010) was a high school teacher and track and field enthusiast. He carried his love of the sport into becoming a major promoter and source of information. Starting in 1968, he joined Doug Smith in the creation of the Arcadia Invitational. Speck oversaw the growth of the meet, from a local spectacle to the premiere in-season nationwide invitational now called the "Home of national records."

He was an innovator. He was thinking of things before others. He really helped in the explosion of our sport.

— Rich Gonzalez

From his office at Arcadia High School, Speck became the ultimate researcher of the best track athletes around the United States. In order to attract the best athletes to the Invitational, he had to know who they were, so Speck tracked performances and statistics, writing columns for running publications like California Track and Running News. In the infancy of the internet, he joined Gonzalez in starting a website providing the most in depth coverage of high school track and field athletes in California. Merging with John Dye's similar site in North Carolina, they created the nationwide Dyestat site self-described as "The Internet Home of High School Track & Field." The California version was known as Dyestatcal.

Speck's fountain of information was not limited to print. He was the P.A. announcer at many of the top high school track and field meets including the Sunkist Invitational, the National Scholastic Indoor Championships, the Foot Locker Cross Country Championships, the Junior National Championships and the series of championship meets that led to the CIF California State Meet. He worked on the advisory committees for the State Championships for both track and field and cross country. It has been suggested the enthusiasm he instilled in the crowd encouraged many national records to happen.

Following his untimely death to brain cancer, the National Scholastic Athletics Foundation created an annual award "The Doug Speck Award for Excellence & Innovation."
