= Jennifer S. Baker =

American academic

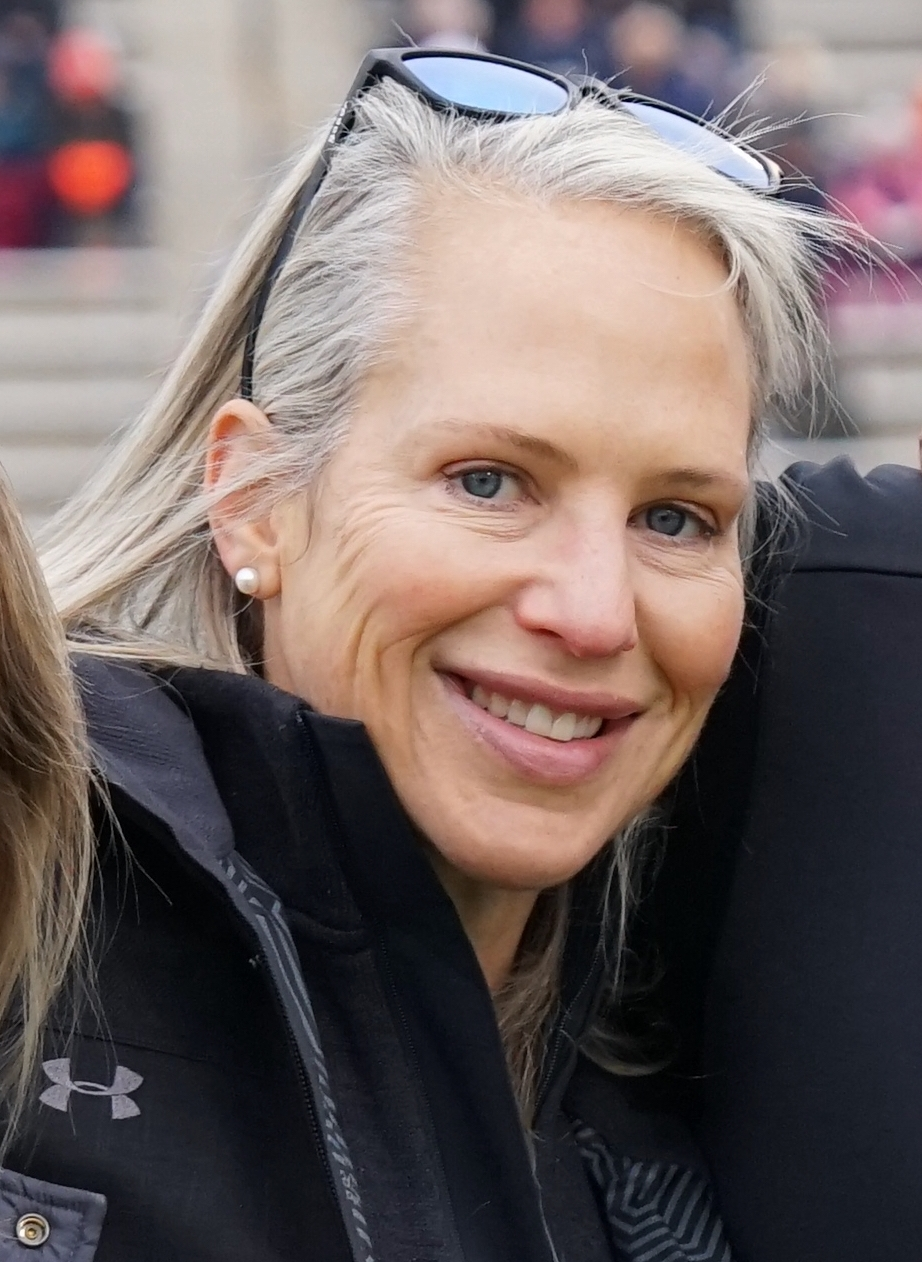
- Baker in 2025

Biographical details
- Education: United States Naval Academy

Administrative career (AD unless noted)
- 2019–: Johns Hopkins

Jennifer S. Baker is the fifth director of athletics and recreation at Johns Hopkins University for the Johns Hopkins Blue Jays.

== Early life and education ==
Baker was born and raised in Lutherville, Maryland, and Monkton, Maryland, where she attended Hereford High School. After graduating from high school, she enrolled at the United States Naval Academy and became a trained pilot before being medically disqualified. Baker served seven years on active duty in the Navy, as a pilot and as a Civil Engineer Corps Officer. After finishing her service commitment, Baker went into private business before moving into teaching and coaching lacrosse full-time at Cape Henry Collegiate School. While serving in this role, Baker enrolled at Cornell University to pursue an MBA in 2010. She then started to research ways to combine sports and leadership and convinced Cornell athletic director Andy Noel to create the Big Red Athletic Leadership Institute.

== Career ==
During her time at Cornell, Baker designed and developed the Big Red Leadership Institute which oversaw over 500 student-athletes across all 37 varsity athletic teams at the school. She also co-founded Athletics Leadership Consulting which aims to "make leadership development accessible to all athletes, coaches and organizational support staff." Baker eventually left Cornell for Under Armour in 2016 to move closer to friends and family in the Baltimore area. A year later, she left her position as senior manager of corporate real estate, facilities and operations and joined the Johns Hopkins University athletics department as their senior associate director of athletics. In 2019, Baker became the fifth director of athletics and recreation at Johns Hopkins University.
