= Arcadia Unified School District =

School district in California, United States

- 150 S. 3rd Ave. Arcadia, California, 91006

District information
- Type: Public
- Grades: K–12
- NCES District ID: 0602970

Students and staff
- Students: 8,946
- Teachers: 370.67
- Staff: 415.61
- Student–teacher ratio: 24.13

Other information
- Website: www.ausd.net

The Arcadia Unified School District (AUSD) is a school district located in Arcadia, California. The district consists of six elementary schools: Holly Avenue, Longley Way, Baldwin Stocker, Camino Grove, Highland Oaks, and Hugo Reid; three middle schools: Richard Henry Dana Middle School, Foothills Middle School, and First Avenue Middle School; and one high school: Arcadia High School.

== History ==
Arcadia Unified School District was founded in 1952. Prior to 1952, students were part of the Arcadia/Monrovia/Duarte School District. Arcadia Unified School District offices were next to Arcadia High School on Campus Drive until July 1, 2013, when it moved to a two-floor office building located on 150 South Third Avenue in Arcadia.

In 2015, the district began a policy allowing transgender students to use facilities for the genders which they identify. Arcadia USD implemented the policy after it reached a settlement with the Office of Civil Rights of the U.S. Department of Education and the U.S. Department of Justice regarding the cabin assignment of a transgender boy who went on a district-organized camping trip.

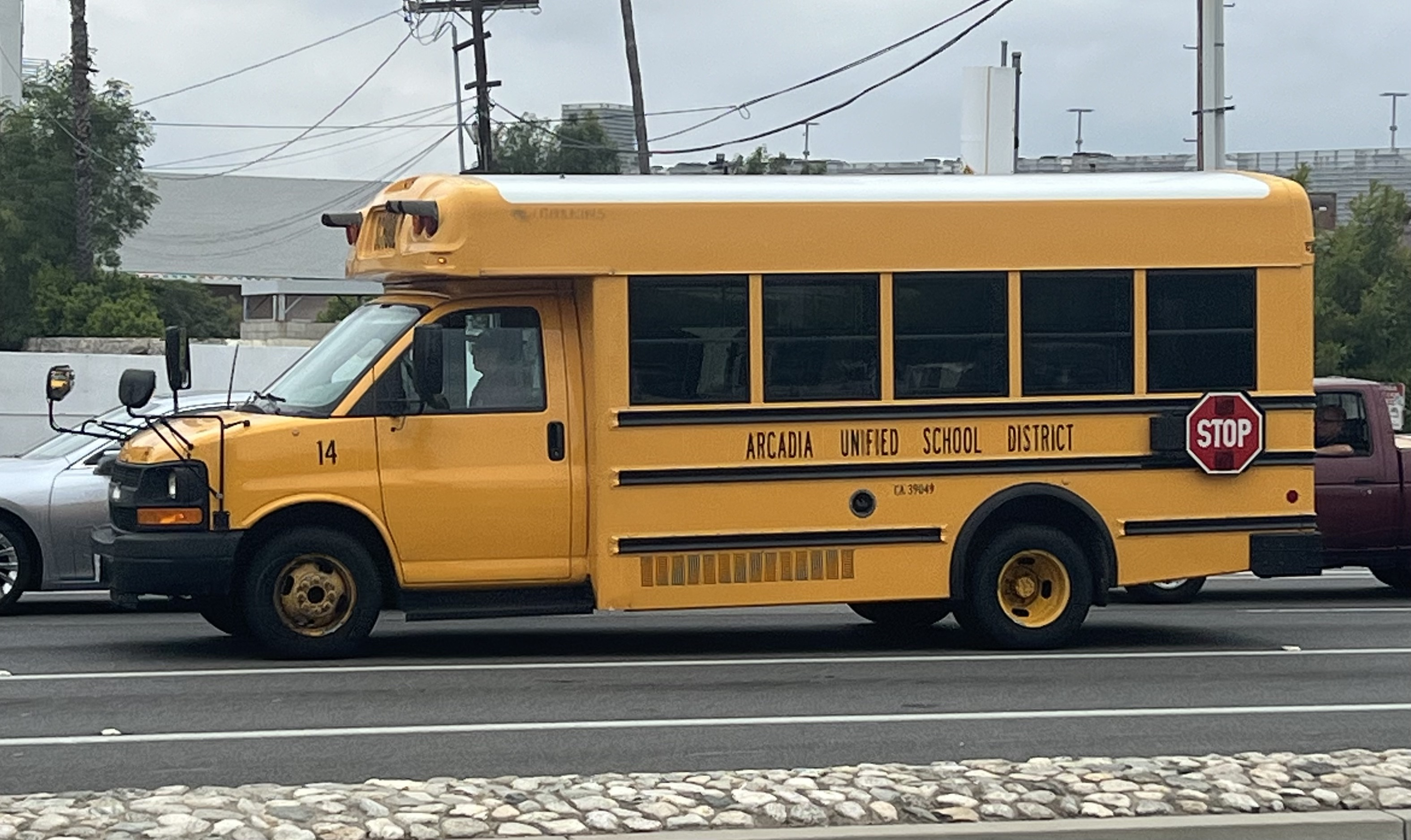
A Chevrolet Express school bus belonging to the Arcadia Unified School District.

== Board of Education ==
The Arcadia Unified School District Board of Education members are elected at-large and composed of five members elected to a four-year term. The elections are held on the third Tuesday in April of odd-numbered years. Starting with the 2020 California Primary election, the Board of Education elections were held on the first Tuesday after the first Monday in March of even-numbered years.

== Schools ==
Middle schools cover grades 6 through 8, and feed into Arcadia High School. There are three Title 1 schools that receive federal funds for high percentages of low-income students: Longley Way Elementary School, Holly Avenue Elementary School, and Camino Grove Elementary School.*

=== Foothills Middle School ===
Foothills Middle School

Location
- 171 E. Sycamore Ave. Arcadia, California 91006; United States; 34.15345°N 118.02605°W

Information
- Type: Middle school
- Motto: "Nothing great was ever achieved without enthusiasm." –Ralph Waldo Emerson
- Established: 1952
- School district: Arcadia Unified School District
- Principal: Benjamin Acker
- Faculty: 33
- Grades: 6-8
- Enrollment: 771 (2012-2013)
- Mascot: Scottie dog
- Website: fh.ausd.net

Feeder elementary schools to this student body population of 764 are primarily Highland Oaks Elementary and Hugo Reid Elementary.

==== Academic performance ====
For 2012–2013, Foothills attained an API of 977. More than 90% of students scored in the advanced proficient category for English and Language Arts, Math, and Science. In the 2007–2008 school year, Foothills Middle School scored second in terms of API in all of the public school systems in California and was the 7th best middle school in California.

==== Improvement works ====
In the summer of 2006, the city passed Measure I, a school bond measure. A portion of the collected revenues will fund improvements at Foothills Middle School, which include converting classrooms to science labs, expanding the music building, upgrading the multipurpose room, the library, and the computer lab facilities. However, construction was not able to start because an inspection test revealed that the school was built on a large fault. Remodeling, however, will continue.

=== Richard Henry Dana Middle School ===
Richard Henry Dana Middle School is located at 1401 First Ave. Arcadia CA, 91006. Mainly, elementary schools that feed into this middle school include Camino Grove Elementary School and Longley Way Elementary School. The school was a 2013 California Distinguished School and was a 1997-1998 Blue Ribbon School of Excellence.
