= Arcadia High School (California) =

Location
- 180 Campus Drive; Arcadia, California 91006; United States; 34°07′50″N 118°02′13″W

Information
- Type: Public
- Motto: A Symbol of Honor and Pride
- Established: 1952
- School district: Arcadia Unified School District
- Principal: Jorge Muñoz
- Faculty: 108.00 (FTE)
- Grades: 9–12
- Enrollment: 3,004 (2023-2024)
- Student to teacher ratio: 27.81
- Colors: Cardinal and gold
- Athletics: CIF Southern Section
- Athletics conference: Pacific League
- Website: ahs.ausd.net

Arcadia High School is a four-year comprehensive secondary school located in Arcadia, California, United States. It is part of the Arcadia Unified School District.

The high school was opened in 1952. The incoming freshman classes consist of students that feed in from Arcadia's three middle schools: First Avenue Middle School, Richard Henry Dana Middle School, and Foothills Middle School.

The school has a teaching staff of 108. Arcadia High School has been accredited by the Western Association of Schools and Colleges—for the first time in 1964 and most recently in 2023, for a fixed term after each evaluation.

== History ==
During 1952, Arcadia High School was opened. 2012 was the planned launch of the 40,000-square-foot (3,700 m^{2}) Arcadia High School Performing Arts Center.

== Controversies ==
=== Native American symbols in branding ===
Before 1997, Arcadia High School had used several Native American symbols in its branding, including an "Apache Joe" mascot, the Pow Wow school newspaper, the "Apache News" television program, the "Smoke Signals" news bulletin boards, the school's auxiliary team's marching "Apache Princesses" and opposing football team fans' "Scalp the Apaches".

In September 1997, the L.A. School Board banned the use of offensive Native American branding from its schools following criticism from several Native American groups. Members of the groups then advocated the same for Arcadia. The school consulted with Native American groups and made some concessions, including the removal of the "Apache Joe" mascot, the "Apache Princesses", and some other portrayals of Native Americans. The student newspaper Pow Wow was renamed to Arcadia Quill in 2021. The news show Apache News retained its name.

Arcadia High School has established a relationship with the White Mountain Apaches through the Student Council Apache Commission (SCAC). The commission holds fundraisers and drives for the White Mountain Apache Tribe in Cibecue, Arizona, and monitors the school's use of Native American motifs.

In July 2020, following several petitions to change the school's nickname, AUSD Superintendent David Vannasdall announced that the administration will consider possible options after schools resume in-class sessions due to the COVID-19 pandemic.

In July 2026, after when California Assembly Bill 3074 went into effect, Arcadia High School retired the Apaches mascot. The news show Apache News was renamed to Arcadia Public Network.

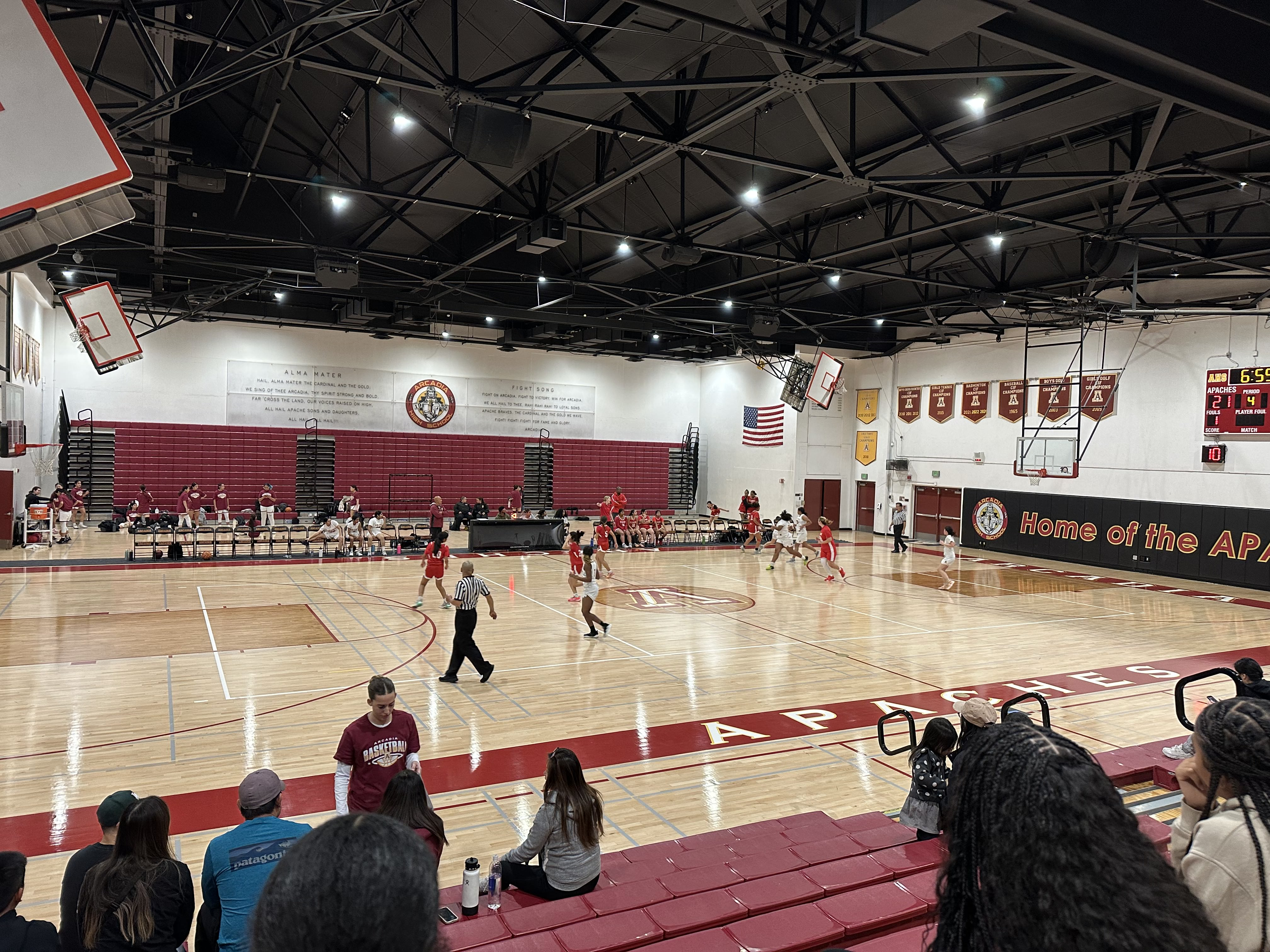
The gym at Arcadia High School.

== Athletics ==
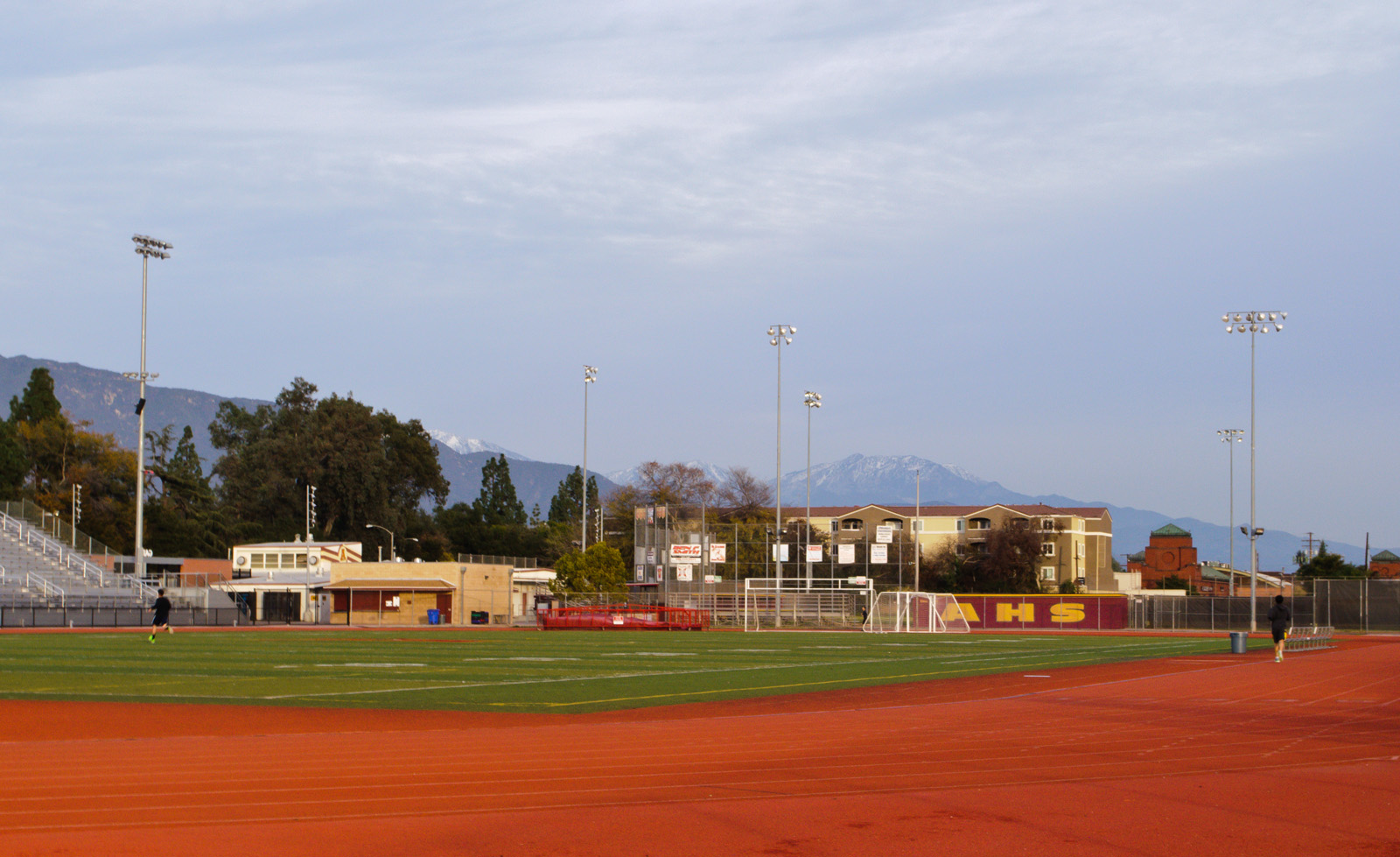
The track at Arcadia High School.

Arcadia High School competes in the California Interscholastic Federation (CIF) Southern Section as a member of the Pacific League. Its teams' colors are cardinal and gold. Boys’ sports include Baseball, Basketball, cross country, football, Golf, soccer, swimming, Tennis, Track and field, Volleyball, Water polo, and Badminton. Girls’ sports include Basketball, cross country, Golf, soccer, Softball, swimming, Tennis, Track and field, Volleyball, Badminton, and Water polo. The school also has a pep squad with Song, Cheer, and Pep Flags.

=== Cross country, and track and field ===
The boys' cross country team earned CIF Division I state championships in 2010 and 2012. Arcadia also won the national title at the Nike Cross Nationals in both 2010 and 2012.

In 2010, the team took first place at Nike Team Nationals and set a new record for the lowest team time in history. The team remained undefeated the entire season and broke the California state record.

In 2012, the boys cross country team won another state championship, led by Estevan De La Rosa. They went on to win the Nike Cross National Championships.

Coach Doug Speck was inducted into the Cross Country Coaches Association Hall of Fame at Mt. San Antonio College in 2009.

Arcadia hosts the annual Arcadia Invitational, considered the largest high school track meet in the United States. The event has featured national high school record holders and future Olympians, including Quincy Watts, Steve Lewis, Danny Everett, Valerie Brisco-Hooks, Gail Devers, Mike Powell, Michael Marsh, Marion Jones, Allyson Felix, Monique Henderson, Deena Kastor, Michelle Perry, Alan Webb, Cathy Freeman from Australia, Bryshon Nellum and other athletic stars such as USC and Los Angeles Rams wide receiver Robert Woods, USC wide receiver Marqise Lee, George Farmer, De'Anthony Thomas, George Atkins III, and Remontay McClain.

== Academic teams ==
Arcadia is home to several academic teams, including the Constitution Team, Quiz Bowl, Destination Imagination, Mathematics Team, Physics Team, Science Olympiad, National Science Bowl, National Ocean Sciences Bowl, Mock Trial Team, Speech and Debate Team, Solar Cup, Academic Decathlon, and National History Bowl.

Recent achievements:

- In 2011 the school won first place at the National Science Bowl, JPL Regional Competition.
- In 2010 the school won first place at the National Science Bowl, JPL Regional Competition.
- In 2013 Arcadia High School won first place at the National Ocean Sciences Bowl Regional Competition at JPL, and first place in the National Ocean Sciences Bowl competition at Milwaukee, Wisconsin.
- In 2010 Arcadia High School won first place at the National Ocean Sciences Bowl Regional Competition
- In 2010 Arcadia High School Constitution Team earned the California State Championship title. In April 2010, Arcadia High School's Constitution Team was declared the national champion of the We the People competition.

== Performing arts ==
Arcadia has a drama program, a dance/prop production program (Colorguard) that has placed third in the nation twice as well as second in 2024. A dance program, an advanced dance company (Orchesis), four choirs, and a large instrumental music program. The Arcadia High School Theatre Department won first place in the High School Intermediate Category for its ensemble performance of Oklahoma!. Competing with schools from all over the United States, they secured the first-place trophy in February 2012. In 2013, the Arcadia High School Theatre Department took home the Drama Teachers Association of Southern California (DTASC) Sweepstakes Trophy. Out of 66 schools throughout Southern California, Arcadia High School won the most first-place awards ranking them in first place for the overall sweepstakes award. The Arcadia High School Marching Band and Color Guard has performed at various events such as the nationally televised 2019 Disney Parks Magical Christmas Day Parade, the Super Bowl, and two Presidential Inauguration Day parades for presidents Dwight D. Eisenhower and George W. Bush. The band has also made 18 appearances in the Rose Parade, which is held in nearby Pasadena, California every New Year's Day, more than any other high school marching band in the country. The Arcadia High School Marching Band and Color Guard is one of the most decorated high school marching bands in the United States.

== Notable alumni ==
- Chris Arnold, former MLB player
- Stevan J. Arnold, American Evolutionary Biologist
- Ryan Bergara, of Watcher and formerly BuzzFeed Unsolved
- Bruce Bochte, former MLB player 1974–86
- Joe Comeau, hard rock and metal musician
- Stacie Chan, voice of Jade in the animated television series Jackie Chan Adventures
- Ian Chen, actor
- David Chapple, NFL football player, artist
- Renee Chen, Taiwanese singer and songwriter signed by Warner Music
- Hal Finney, computer scientist, first person to receive a Bitcoin transaction, key software developer for Pretty Good Privacy and Bitcoin
- Marianne Gravatte, model/actress and 1983 Playmate of the Year
- Dave Hostetler, professional baseball player 1981–88
- Steve Kemp, professional baseball player 1977–88
- Mike Lansford, professional NFL placekicker for Los Angeles Rams 1980–90
- Marlene Longenecker, president of National Women's Studies Association, 1989-1991
- Bruce Matthews played football at Arcadia High and at USC; played in the NFL for Houston Oilers/Tennessee Titans; a first-year (inducted in the first year of eligibility) Hall of Famer of 2007.
- Clay Matthews played football at Arcadia High and at USC; played in the NFL for the Cleveland Browns and the Atlanta Falcons; a 4-time Pro Bowler.
- Mirai Nagasu, national champion and Olympic figure skater, attended Arcadia High School for two years.
- Stevie Nicks, member of the pop-rock band Fleetwood Mac, inducted in Rock and Roll Hall of Fame; attended Arcadia High School.
- Brian Ralston, film/TV composer; member of the Arcadia High School Marching Band while in high school.
- Mike Saxon, professional football player.
- Bill Seinsoth, played baseball and holds records at Arcadia High and at USC; Los Angeles Dodgers first-round draft pick; killed in an auto crash shortly thereafter in 1969.
- Mark Smith, former MLB player
- Tracy Smith, distance runner; member, 1968 U.S. Olympic team, 10,000 meters; world-record holder, 3-mile; 6-time AAU national champion; 1963 CIF state champion, mile
- Michael Anthony Sobolewski, bassist and founding member of the hard rock band Van Halen
- John Schuhmacher, former professional football player
- John Speraw, UCLA men's volleyball head coach; only individual in men's volleyball history to win an NCAA Championship as a head coach, assistant coach (2007, 2009, 2012) and player (1995); MPSF Coach of the Year, 2006. U.S. National Indoor Team assistant coach; gold medal, 2008 Beijing Olympics{}
- David Tao, Taiwanese singer
- Mark Tuan, singer, dancer, rapper; member of South Korean boy group Got7
- Debbie Turner, actress, played role of Marta Von Trapp in the film The Sound of Music
- Rena Wang, badminton player; invited by World Badminton Federation to compete at the 2012 Olympics in women's singles
- Angel Yin, pro golfer; youngest player in the 2017 Solheim Cup
