= Pacific League (California) =

High school athletic conference

The Pacific League is a high school athletic conference in Los Angeles County, California affiliated with the CIF Southern Section. Members include two high schools in the Burbank Unified School District, three in the Glendale Unified School District, two in the Pasadena Unified School District, and one in Arcadia.

== Schools ==
As of 2019, the schools in the league are:

- Arcadia High School, since 1962
- Burbank High School, since 2006
- Burroughs High School (Burbank, California), since 2006
- Crescenta Valley High School (La Crescenta, California), since 1962
- Glendale High School, since 1982
- Hoover High School (Glendale, California), since 1982
- Muir High School (Pasadena, California), since 1972
- Pasadena High School, since 1972
