= Hereford Zone, Maryland =

Coordinates: 39°35′20″N 76°39′50″W

The Hereford Zone is an area in Northern Baltimore County, Maryland, United States, constituting 20% of all of the land in Baltimore County. It includes Hereford, Parkton, Monkton, Freeland, Sparks, White Hall, Hampstead, Upperco, Manchester, and Phoenix.

It is by far one of the most sparsely populated areas in Baltimore County. Strict zoning laws prohibit most planned communities from developing, with large single-family housing lots and agricultural activity predominating.

Because of its higher elevation and microclimate, the weather of The Hereford Zone is slightly different from that of the rest of the county. It is not unusual in the winter for schools in the surrounding areas to be 2 hours late, while the Hereford Zone is closed due to inclement weather. The climate remains hot-summer humid continental (Dfa) while the remainder of the county has a humid subtropical climate (Cfa). The hardiness zone of the area is 7a.

Near the most northern part of the zone in the topmost strip where Baltimore County meets south central Pennsylvania, numerous mini tornadoes and wind storms zip through the fields unfettered by buildings or natural land changes to halt their progress. The air quality in the area is markedly different from that of the suburbs of Baltimore City to the south. Both the land elevation as it climbs from sea level to 966' at the Mason-Dixon Line near Stiltz, Pa., on Middletown Rd and the absence of smokestack manufacturing combine with the prevailing westerly winds to eliminate the yellow haze associated with low levels of pollution on even the most humid summer days.

In the Hereford Zone, Prettyboy Reservoir covers an area of about 207 sq/km behind the scenic Prettyboy Dam on the Gunpowder River.

Hereford High School is the host of the annual "Bull Run" Cross Country Invitational, run in the end of September, which is one of the largest East Coast cross country running events, attracting over 100 schools from surrounding states. The "grueling" course is noted for its hills, twists, turns, and a steep ravine known as "The Dip", all making for what has been called "The Toughest Three Miles in Cross-Country" by John Dye of DyeStat.
