= DyeStat =

American sport website

DyeStat was a website self-described as "The Internet Home of High School Track & Field". It was founded in 1998 by John Dye, and featured his wife (Donna Dye) as the features editor, senior editor Steve Underwood, assistant editor Dave Devine, two California co-editors (Rich Gonzalez, Doug Speck) and one business/marketing manager (Kirsten Leetch). The site listed many of the best times for both Cross Country and Track & Field on the high school level, while also covering most state and national championships. It was often used as a source for ranking and other statistics by journalists. DyeStat also featured forums for athletes to discuss running.

ESPN acquired DyeStat in 2008, but later shut it down when it got rid of its high school division in 2012.

== The First 10 Years ==
DyeStat was founded by John Dye in 1995 and was aimed at high school coaches in western Maryland and served to compile results and rankings. Initially run as an amateur site, the expenses became too high. Sponsors such as Rivals and then Nike provided funds to maintain the sites activities, along with the National Scholastic Sports Foundation (NSSF).

An integral part of the site was the different forums for each state. DyeStat was recommended by both the NSSF and USATF. As of 30 July 2007, the forums had approximately 16,500 members, ranging from high school to international level athletes.

DyeStat also hosted videos and photos from some of the major high school cross country and track & field meets around the country.

== ESPN ==
On June 12, 2008 ESPN announced that it has reached an agreement to acquire Student Sports Inc., which included DyeStat, to become part of the network's new high school initiative ESPN RISE. The purchase of Dyestat by ESPN was generally opposed by the forum members and the ESPN Rise forums remain inactive. ESPN Rise Track & XC Forums. Most former Dyestat members have either stopped posting or migrated to Tracktalk.net On March 8, 2011, Steve Underwood begged for the return of his members back to the ESPN Rise Dyestat corporation.

== Rankings ==
DyeStat compiled Elite lists, which chronicled the best high school athletes in the nation as well as high school rankings. The ranking in most events had a depth of about 100 athletes allowing high school athletes to compare themselves to their peers throughout the United States.

== RunnerSpace ==
In 2012 RunnerSpace.com partnered up with John Dye and is the new owner of DyeStat. It was announced December 7, 2012 by RunnerSpace president Ross Krempley and DyeStat founder John Dye.

The new dyestat.com site hosted by RunnerSpace features the TFX performance ranking system and archives of DyeStat coverage since 1999.
