= Arcadia, California =

City in California, United States

- City
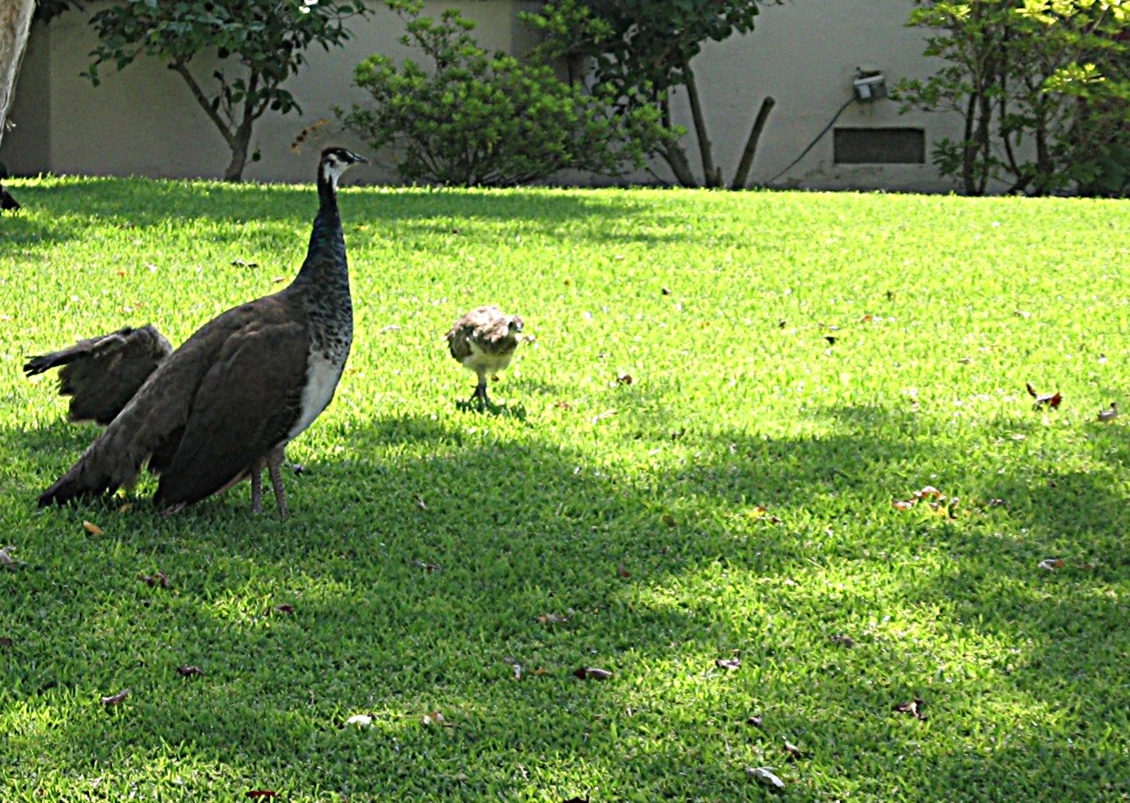
- Peafowl, a symbol of Arcadia, walking on a lawn in the city

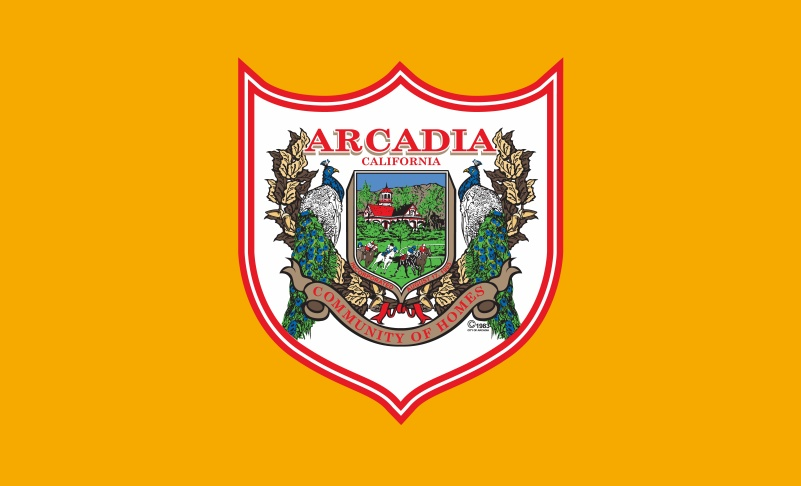
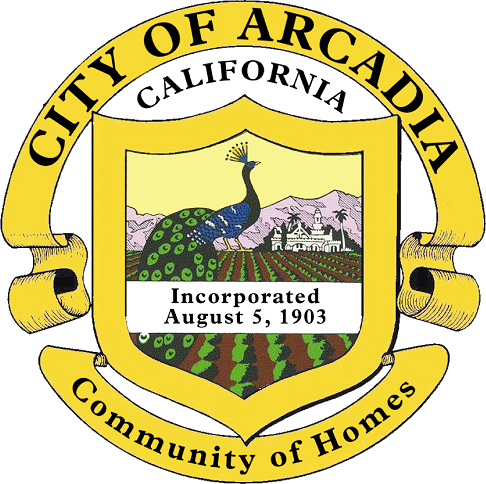
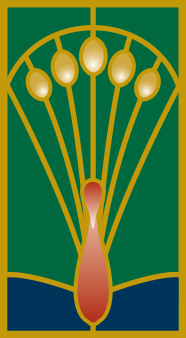
- Flag Seal Logo
- Motto: Community of Homes
- Interactive map of Arcadia, California
- Location in California Arcadia (the United States) Arcadia (North America)
- Coordinates: 34°7′58″N 118°2′11″W
- Country: United States
- State: California
- County: Los Angeles
- Incorporated: August 5, 1903
- Named for: Arcadia, Greece

Government
  - Type: Council–manager
  - Mayor: Paul P. Cheng
  - Mayor Pro Tem: David Fu
  - City Council: Michael Cao; Jon Hahn; Sharon Kwan
  - City Manager: Dominic Lazzaretto

Area
  - Total: 11.14 sq mi (28.84 km^{2})
  - Land: 10.93 sq mi (28.30 km^{2})
  - Water: 0.21 sq mi (0.54 km^{2}) 1.87%
- Elevation: 482 ft (147 m)

Population (2020)
  - Total: 56,681
  - Density: 5,187.3/sq mi (2,002.81/km^{2})
- Time zone: UTC−8 (Pacific)
  - Summer (DST): UTC−7 (PDT)
- ZIP Codes: 91006–91007, 91066, 91077
- Area code: 626
- FIPS code: 06-02462
- GNIS feature IDs: 1652664, 2409722
- Website: www.arcadiaca.gov

Arcadia is a city in Los Angeles County, California, United States, located about 13 miles (21 km) northeast of downtown Los Angeles in the San Gabriel Valley and at the base of the San Gabriel Mountains. It contains a series of adjacent parks consisting of the Santa Anita Park racetrack, the Los Angeles County Arboretum and Botanic Garden, and Arcadia County Park. The city had a population of 56,681 at the 2020 census. The city is named after Arcadia, Greece.

== History ==
=== Native American ===
For over 8,000 years, the site of Arcadia was part of the homeland of the Tongva people ("Gabrieleño" tribe), a Californian Native American tribe whose territory spanned the greater Los Angeles Basin, and the San Gabriel and San Fernando Valleys. Their fluid borders stretched between the Santa Susana Mountains, San Bernardino Mountains, and San Gabriel Mountains in the north; the Santa Monica Mountains and Simi Hills in the west; the San Jacinto Mountains and Santa Ana Mountains in the east; and the coast and Catalina Island (Pimu) in the south. A Tongva settlement site within present-day Arcadia was known as Alyeupkigna (or Aluupkenga).

=== Rancho period ===
The town's site became part of the Spanish Mission San Gabriel Arcángel lands in 1771. After Indian Reductions to become Mission Indians, the Tongva were known as the Gabrieleños, after the name of the Mission under whose control they worked during the mission period in California. Currently there are 1,700 people self-identifying as members of the Tongva or Gabrieleño tribe.

The Mexican land grant for Rancho Santa Anita was issued to Perfecto Hugo Reid and his Tongva wife, Victoria Bartolomea Comicrabit, in 1845. It was named after a family relation, Anita Cota, on his wife's side. Reid documented the Gabrieleño Native Americans in a series of letters written in 1852, and served as a delegate to the 1849 California Constitutional Convention. In 1847, Reid sold Rancho Santa Anita to his Rancho Azusa neighbor, Henry Dalton.

=== Lucky Baldwin ===
The rancho changed owners several times before being acquired by Gold Rush immigrant, businessman, and major regional land owner Elias Jackson "Lucky" Baldwin in 1875. Baldwin purchased 8,000 acres (32 km^{2}) of Rancho Santa Anita for $200,000. Upon seeing the area, he gasped "By Gads! This is paradise!" Upon buying the land, Baldwin chose to make the area his home and immediately started erecting buildings and cultivating the land for farming, orchards, and ranches. Baldwin built the Queen Anne Cottage for his fourth wife and himself in 1885–1886, now preserved within the Arboretum. In 1885, the main line of the Los Angeles and San Gabriel Valley Railroad, in which Baldwin was a stockholder, was opened through the ranch, making subdivision of part of the land into a town site practical. Later, this rail line became a Santa Fe Railroad line. In 1889, on a site just north of the corner of First Avenue and St. Joseph Street, adjacent to the Santa Fe tracks, Baldwin opened the 35-room Hotel Oakwood to be the centerpiece of his new town. In 1890, the extant Rancho Santa Anita Depot was built.

=== 20th century until World War II ===
By the turn of the 20th century, Arcadia had a population nearing 500 and an economy that was coming to be based on entertainment, sporting, hospitality, and gambling opportunities, the latter including an early version of the Santa Anita race track. Baldwin oversaw the incorporation of Arcadia into a city in 1903, and was its first mayor.

==== Anoakia ====
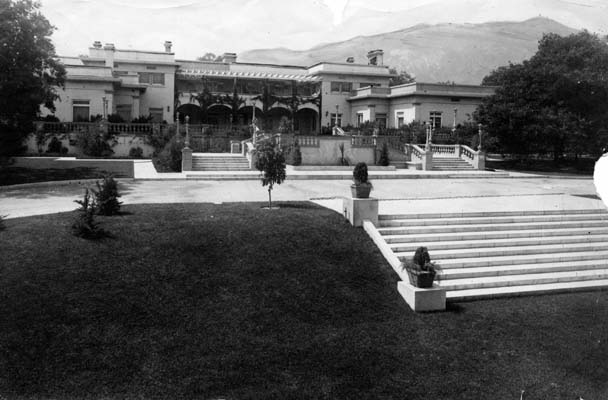
Anita Baldwin's "Anoakia" mansion and gardens in 1915

In 1913, Anita Baldwin, Lucky's daughter, built a 50-room mansion on 19 acres (77,000 m^{2}) of the Baldwin Ranch she inherited from him, and named it "Anoakia" (a portmanteau of Anita and oak). The 17,000-square-foot (1,600 m^{2}) residence was in the Italian Renaissance Revival style, with murals by Maynard Dixon. The estate had a significant Greek Revival-style colonnaded "Parthenon" bathhouse/gymnasium beside a large pool, an apiary and aviaries, kennels and stables, tennis courts and pergolas, and preserved the native oak woodlands.

After her death in 1939, the estate became the Anoakia School for Girls, which became the coeducational Anoakia School in 1967, then moved to Duarte in 1990 as the Anita Oaks School. The school owner's efforts to develop the property into a village of homes with the old mansion as its centerpiece were rejected by the city. Despite efforts by local citizens and regional preservationists to preserve the historic main house, the city council voted in 1999 to approve demolition by new owners for a real estate development. The "Anoakia" mansion, all other significant estate structures and outbuildings, garden features, and numerous California sycamore and Coast live oak trees were demolished for 31 luxury home sites in 2000. Some of the mansion's architectural elements were salvaged and removed. The gatehouse, on the estate's former southeast corner at Foothill and Baldwin, and the perimeter walls remained after the "Anoakia Estates" development was built. The bas-relief fountain was moved to just inside the new gated entrance.

==== Inter-war decades ====
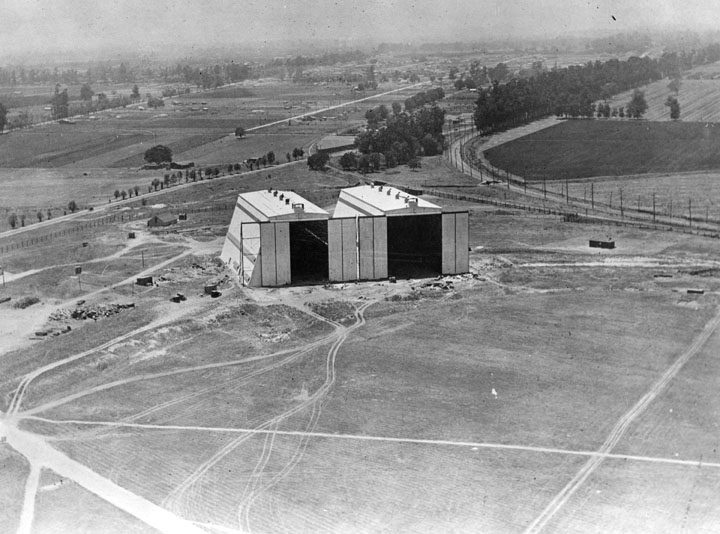
U.S. Army's Ross Field Balloon School hangars

During World War I, Arcadia was home to the U.S. Army's Ross Field Balloon School, at the present-day Santa Anita Park site. Army observers were trained here in techniques to observe enemy activity from hot air balloons.

After World War I, Arcadia's population grew and local businesses included many chicken ranches and other agricultural activities. During the 1920s and 1930s, Arcadia began its transition to the residential city that it is today, as small farms and chicken ranches gave way to homes and numerous civic improvements, including a city library and a city hall. Scenes of many of Arcadia's interesting older sites can be viewed in a series of historic watercolors painted by local artists Edna Lenz and Justine Wishek. The city was on historic U.S. Route 66, present-day Colorado Boulevard, with businesses serving travelers on it.

Thoroughbred horse racing had flourished briefly under Lucky Baldwin, who founded a racetrack adjacent to the present site, until it was outlawed by the state of California in 1909. It returned to Arcadia when racing was legalized again, with the opening of Santa Anita Park in December 1934. Architect Gordon Kaufmann designed its various buildings in a combination of Colonial Revival and Streamline Moderne styles.

=== Santa Anita Assembly Center ===
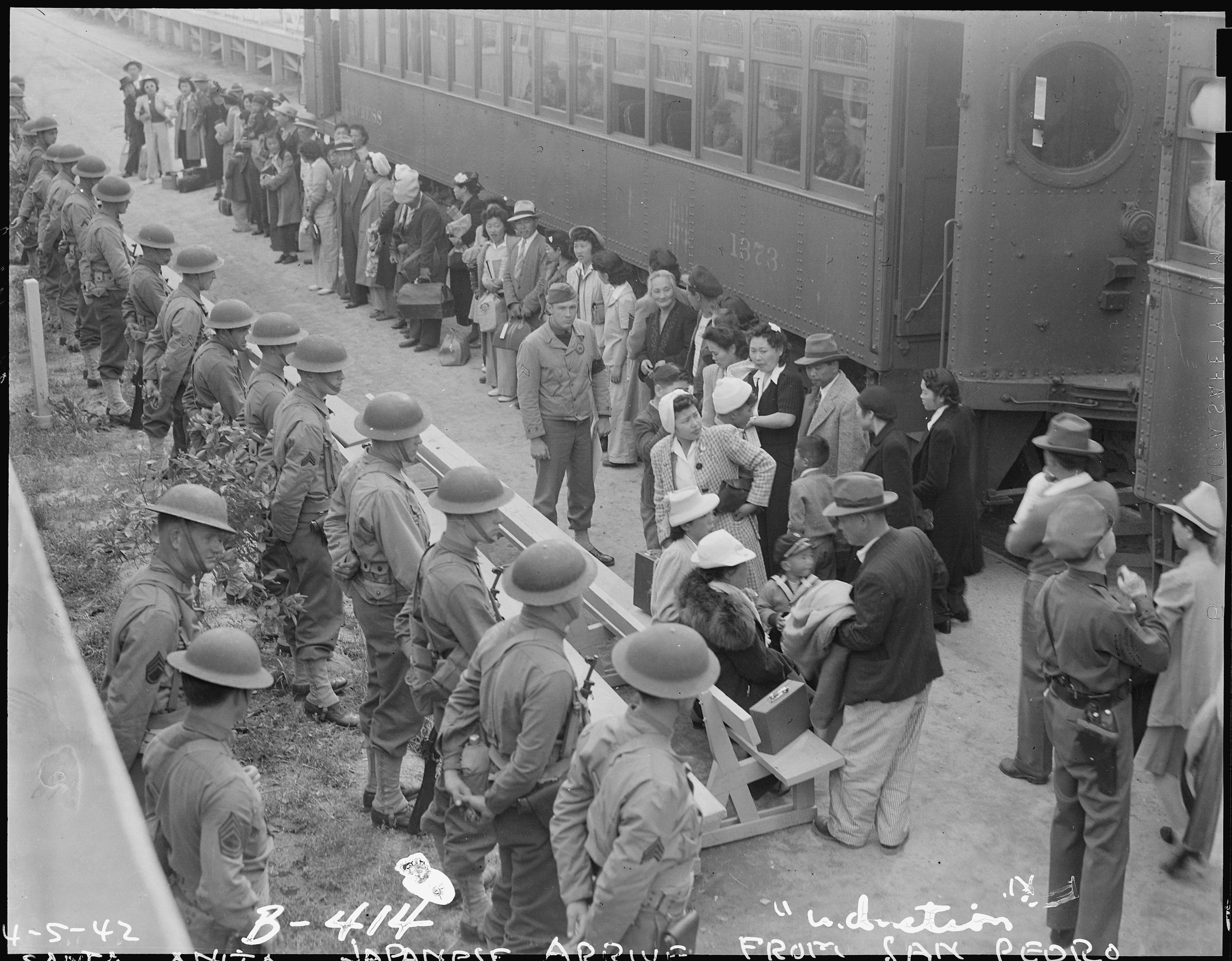
Japanese American citizens arrive in Arcadia, relocated to the Santa Anita Assembly Center.

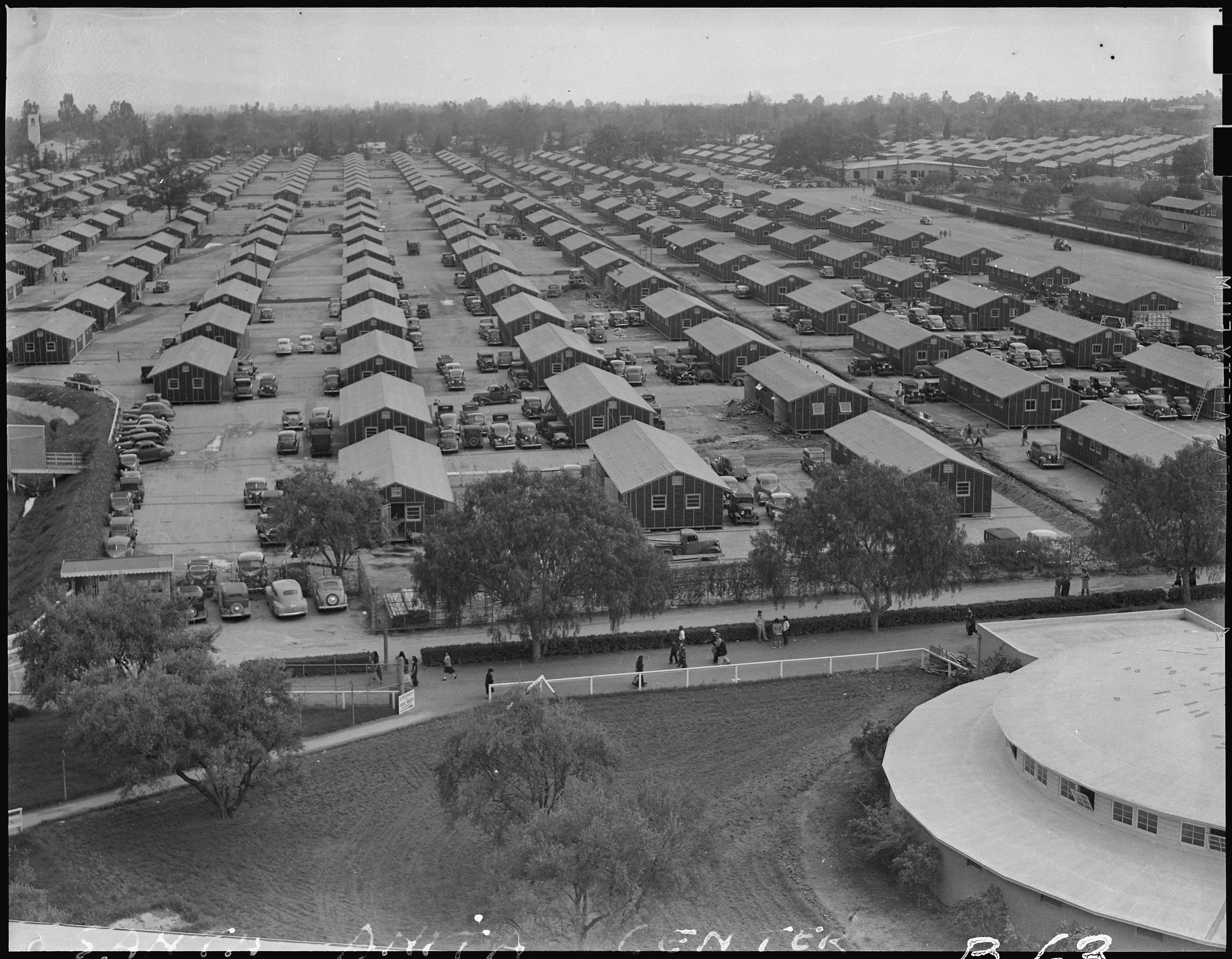
Santa Anita Assembly Center tarpaper barracks, at the Santa Anita Park racetrack

The Santa Anita Assembly Center site is California Historical Landmark #934. In 1942 during World War II, the racetrack grounds were used as a processing and holding site for Japanese Americans who had been removed from their homes and communities for forced relocation and internment under President Franklin Roosevelt's Executive Order 9066. The Civilian Assembly Center at the racetrack became the largest and longest operating one of the eighteen, holding citizens until the Relocation Center camps were completed in interior areas of California and other states. More than 18,000 persons resided at the racetrack in primitive conditions. Four hundred temporary tarpaper barracks were constructed on the racetrack grounds to house many of the detainees, where they lived three families per unit. 8,500 detainees lived in converted horse stalls. Bachelors were housed in the grandstand building. They had group showers, non-private bathrooms, and 24-hour armed surveillance. Each resident was given an "Army manufacture bed, one blanket and one straw tick." The Assembly Center held people from late March through the end of October 1942, when the internees were relocated inland to permanent internment camps at Manzanar and Tule Lake in California, and eight others in Western states and Arkansas.

In November 1942 the center was turned over to the United States Army Ordnance Corps for training purposes and was officially renamed Camp Santa Anita. Later in the war it served as a prisoner of war—POW camp, holding several thousand of Rommel's German Afrika Korps soldiers.

=== Postwar period ===
Arcadia largely grew up as the well-to-do suburb of neighboring Pasadena, with many early residents being the sons and daughters of long-established Southern California families. A large tract of estate homes was developed by Harry Chandler, the scion of the Los Angeles Times, who lived in adjacent Sierra Madre, California. The city became the residence of choice for many corporate chief executives, including those in the aerospace, horse-racing, and finance industries.

The postwar boom saw Arcadia grow rapidly into a suburban residential community, with many of the chicken ranches being subdivided into home lots. Between 1940 and 1950, the population grew by more than two and a half times. The housing boom continued through the 1950s and 1960s and along with that growth came the necessary infrastructure of schools, commercial buildings, and expanded city services.

During the postwar boom, a modern commercial district developed along Baldwin Avenue south of Huntington Drive in west Arcadia. In 1951 this strip, called the West Arcadia Hub, was anchored by a new, locally owned Hinshaw's department store. This was the first large department store to be built in Arcadia, and the largest in the western San Gabriel Valley outside the city of Pasadena. This development marked the beginning of Arcadia's gradual transformation into one of the leading shopping districts of the San Gabriel Valley.

In 1947, 111 acres (0.45 km^{2}) that comprised the heart of the Baldwin Ranch were deeded to the State of California and the County of Los Angeles, and developed into Los Angeles County Arboretum and Botanic Garden.

In October 1975, the Santa Anita Fashion Park was opened to the public on the corner of Baldwin Avenue and Huntington Drive, on part of the former Santa Anita Assembly Center site. The center court featured a very large "Blue head" by artist Roy Lichtenstein, which was later removed. The mall expanded in 2004 and was renamed Westfield Santa Anita. It was affected by the Great Recession of the late 2000s.

James Dobson, a former Arcadia resident, founded the nonprofit Christian ministry Focus on the Family in the city in 1977. Focus on the Family is now based in Colorado Springs, Colorado, but still has thousands of members in Arcadia.

In the 1980s, the Asian population in Arcadia began to grow. The city had remained 99% white until the late 1970s, but in 1985, the Los Angeles Times reported that the Asian population had grown from 4% in 1980 to an estimated 9%, overtaking Latinos, who accounted for roughly 7% of the population. By the 2020 census, Asians consisted of 64.56% of the population.

== Geography ==
According to the United States Census Bureau, the city has a total area of 11.1 square miles (29 km^{2}), of which 10.9 square miles (28 km^{2}) is land and 0.2 square miles (0.52 km^{2}) (1.87%) is water.

== Demographics ==
Historical population
Census	Pop.	Note	%±
1910	696		—
1920	2,239		221.7%
1930	5,216		133.0%
1940	9,122		74.9%
1950	23,066		152.9%
1960	41,005		77.8%
1970	45,138		10.1%
1980	45,993		1.9%
1990	48,290		5.0%
2000	53,054		9.9%
2010	56,364		6.2%
2020	56,681		0.6%
U.S. Decennial Census; 1860–1870 1880–1890; 1900 1910 1920; 1930 1940 1950; 1960 1970 1980; 1990 2000 2010; 2020

Arcadia first appeared as a city in the 1910 U.S. census.

=== Racial and ethnic composition ===
Arcadia city, California– Racial and ethnic composition Note: the US Census treats Hispanic/Latino as an ethnic category. This table excludes Latinos from the racial categories and assigns them to a separate category. Hispanics/Latinos may be of any race.
Race / Ethnicity (NH = Non-Hispanic)	Pop 1980	Pop 1990	Pop 2000	Pop 2010	Pop 2020	% 1980	% 1990	% 2000	% 2010	% 2020
White alone (NH)	40,707	31,409	21,259	14,467	9,968	88.50%	65.04%	40.07%	25.67%	17.59%
Black or African American alone (NH)	91	354	574	628	868	0.20%	0.73%	1.08%	1.11%	1.53%
Native American or Alaska Native alone (NH)	216	132	65	73	53	0.47%	0.27%	0.12%	0.13%	0.09%
Asian alone (NH)	1,748	11,175	24,018	33,224	36,608	3.80%	23.14%	45.27%	58.95%	64.59%
Native Hawaiian or Pacific Islander alone (NH)	1,748	11,175	29	15	40	3.80%	23.14%	0.04%	0.03%	0.07%
Other race alone (NH)	75	74	96	90	239	0.16%	0.15%	0.18%	0.16%	0.42%
Mixed race or Multiracial (NH)	x	x	1,384	1,068	1,504	x	x	2.61%	1.89%	2.65%
Hispanic or Latino (any race)	3,157	5,146	5,629	6,799	7,401	6.86%	10.66%	10.61%	12.06%	13.06%
Total	45,994	48,290	53,054	56,364	56,681	100.00%	100.00%	100.00%	100.00%	100.00%

=== 2020 census ===
As of the 2020 census, Arcadia had a population of 56,681. The population density was 5,187.2 people per square mile. The median age was 44.1 years. 20.0% of residents were under the age of 18 and 19.7% of residents were 65 years of age or older. For every 100 females there were 91.4 males, and for every 100 females age 18 and over there were 88.3 males age 18 and over.

100.0% of residents lived in urban areas, while 0.0% lived in rural areas.

There were 19,377 households in Arcadia, of which 35.4% had children under the age of 18 living in them. Of all households, 58.0% were married-couple households, 13.3% were households with a male householder and no spouse or partner present, and 25.4% were households with a female householder and no spouse or partner present. About 17.8% of all households were made up of individuals and 8.5% had someone living alone who was 65 years of age or older.

There were 20,511 housing units, of which 5.5% were vacant. The homeowner vacancy rate was 1.5% and the rental vacancy rate was 4.1%. Arcadia had 19,377 occupied units; 11,372 (58.7%) were owner-occupied and 8,005 (41.3%) were renter-occupied. Of the vacant units, 347 (1.7% of total) were for rent, 51 (0.2%) were rented but not occupied, 169 (0.8%) were for sale only, 94 (0.5%) were sold but not occupied, 146 (0.7%) were for seasonal, recreational, or occasional use, and 327 (1.6%) were otherwise vacant.

Racial composition as of the 2020 census
Race	Number	Percent
White	11,378	20.1%
Black or African American	959	1.7%
American Indian and Alaska Native	233	0.4%
Asian	36,772	64.9%
Native Hawaiian and Other Pacific Islander	46	0.1%
Some other race	3,158	5.6%
Two or more races	4,135	7.3%
Hispanic or Latino (of any race)	7,401	13.1%

Including all responses for people of two or more races, 38,078 (67.2% of population) were Asian alone or in combination with one or more other races, 15,068 (26.6%) were White alone or in combination with one or more other races, 1,386 (2.4%) were Black or African American alone or in combination, 578 (1.0%) were American Indian and Alaska Native alone or in combination, 173 (0.3%) were Native Hawaiian and Other Pacific Islander alone or in combination, and 5,852 (10.3%) were some other race alone or in combination with one or more other races.

7,401 (13.1%) were Hispanic or Latino of any race. Of those, 1,410 (2.5% of total population) were white alone, 91 (0.2%) were Black or African American alone, 180 (0.3%) were American Indian and Alaska Native alone, 164 (0.3%) were Asian alone, 6 (0.0%) were Native Hawaiian and Other Pacific Islander alone, 2,919 (5.1%) were some other race alone, and 2,631 (4.6%) were two or more races.

The median household income between 2017 and 2021 was $99,588 (2021 dollars), with 8.9% of people living in poverty. 96.7% of households had a computer between 2017 and 2021, and 94.0% had a broadband internet subscription.

=== 2010 census ===
The 2010 United States census reported that Arcadia had a population of 56,364. The population density was 5,062.5 inhabitants per square mile (1,954.6/km^{2}). The racial makeup of Arcadia was 33,353 (59.2%) Asian, 18,191 (32.3%) White, (25.7% Non-Hispanic White), 681 (1.2%) African American, 186 (0.3%) Native American, 16 (0.03%) Pacific Islander, 2,352 (4.2%) from other races, and 1,585 (2.8%) from two or more races. Hispanic or Latino of any race were 6,799 persons (12.1%).

The census reported that 55,502 people (98.5% of the population) lived in households, 639 (1.1%) lived in non-institutionalized group quarters, and 223 (0.4%) were institutionalized. There were 19,592 households, out of which 7,336 (37.4%) had children under the age of 18 living in them, 11,703 (59.7%) were opposite-sex married couples living together, 2,437 (12.4%) had a female householder with no husband present, 865 (4.4%) had a male householder with no wife present. There were 469 (2.4%) unmarried opposite-sex partnerships, and 92 (0.5%) same-sex married couples or partnerships. 3,855 households (19.7%) were made up of individuals, and 1,926 (9.8%) had someone living alone who was 65 years of age or older. The average household size was 2.83. There were 15,005 families (76.6% of all households); the average family size was 3.26.

The population was spread out, with 12,290 people (21.8%) under the age of 18, 4,102 people (7.3%) aged 18 to 24, 13,409 people (23.8%) aged 25 to 44, 17,349 people (30.8%) aged 45 to 64, and 9,214 people (16.3%) who were 65 years of age or older. The median age was 43.1 years. For every 100 females, there were 91.2 males. For every 100 females age 18 and over, there were 87.7 males according to the census.

There were 20,686 housing units at an average density of 1,858.0 per square mile (717.4/km^{2}), of which 12,371 (63.1%) were owner-occupied, and 7,221 (36.9%) were occupied by renters. The homeowner vacancy rate was 1.1%; the rental vacancy rate was 6.7%. 37,000 people (65.6% of the population) lived in owner-occupied housing units and 18,502 people (32.8%) lived in rental housing units.

== Economy ==
Arcadia's economy is driven by wholesale trade, retail trade, manufacturing, health care and social assistance, arts, entertainment, and recreation. Revenue from the Santa Anita Racetrack has long supported capital improvements for the City of Arcadia, resulting in the city having very little bonded indebtedness.

The Shops at Santa Anita mall (formerly Westfield Santa Anita, formerly the Santa Anita Fashion Park) is a major shopping center in the city. In 2005, the Westfield Santa Anita completed its first phase of expansion, featuring a new food court, numerous smaller retailers, various full-service eateries in an area known as Restaurant Square, and a 16-screen AMC Theatres megaplex. In 2008, expansion of the mall continued as the Promenade outdoor structure was completed, with new high-end retailers.

In 2004, citing success from regional shopping malls such as The Grove and The Americana, Caruso Affiliated and Magna Entertainment (the owners of the Santa Anita Park racetrack) proposed to build a second large shopping mall adjacent to Westfield Santa Anita on the grounds of the Santa Anita Park south parking lot, which would have made Arcadia the largest retail shopping district in Los Angeles County. The controversial project, known as "The Shops at Santa Anita", originally included retail, restaurants, condominium projects, a decorative water display, and a horse-drawn trolley. Arcadia City Council unanimously approved the project in 2007 after much heated debate between some residents in the community and corporate interests, which included ballot initiatives such as free parking for Arcadia residents, prevention of retail signage installations, and downsizing the project by the removal of condominiums from the project. Magna Entertainment filed for Chapter 11 bankruptcy during the Great Recession in 2009 and dissolved the partnership with Caruso Affiliated, with Caruso Affiliated a filing a $21 million bankruptcy claim in 2010 to cover damages Caruso Affiliated incurred as a result of the inability to complete the project. The plan to build "The Shops at Santa Anita" was ultimately terminated on May 20, 2011.

=== Top employers ===
According to the city's 2024 Comprehensive Annual Financial Report, the top private employers in the city are:

#	Employer	# of Employees
1	Atlas Assembly	740
2	FedEx Ground Package System, Inc.	588
3	Nordstrom Inc.	386
4	Macy's	289
5	Din Tai Fung	265
6	Optum	232
7	Glenair, Inc.	220
8	Arcadia Care Center	187
9	The Cheesecake Factory Restaurants, Inc.	180
10	Dave & Buster's	145

=== Tourism ===
The Los Angeles County Arboretum and Botanic Garden is located in Arcadia across from the Santa Anita mall and racetrack. The peafowl that roam free on the grounds and in the neighborhoods near the arboretum are a remainder of the former Baldwin ranch. When the peafowl were brought from India, they helped control snakes and snails on his farm. They are considered an attraction to some residents and a nuisance to others due to their loud cries and the droppings they leave on residents' properties.

== Government ==
=== Local government ===
Effective with the 2018 elections, Arcadia voters elect a City Council member by geographical district instead of at-large.

Following Eileen Wang's resignation on federal charges of acting as an illegal agent of a foreign government, the City Council appointed Paul P. Cheng to fill the vacancy of Mayor. He will serve the remainder of Wang's term until December 2026.

==== List of mayors ====
Mayors of Arcadia:

- 1927–1930 A. N. Multer
- 1930–1931 John M. Walshe
- 1931–1932 Harry A. Link
- 1932 John J. Bottema
- 1932 Earl Busse
- 1932–1936 Richard Krebs, Jr.
- 1936–1937 Grant W. Corby
- 1937–1938 J. R. Griffitts
- 1938–1939 A. F. Malin
- 1939–1940 J. F. Griffitts
- 1940–1942 A. H. Perkins
- 1942–1948 M. H. Ormsby
- 1948–1950 C. Loree Russell
- 1950–1952 Thomas C. Sullivan
- 1952–1954 John A. Schmocker
- 1954 Raymond M. Kennett
- 1954–1955 Robert Dow
- 1955–1956 Dwight L. Hulse
- 1956–1957 Donald S. Camphouse
- 1957–1958 Robert F. Dennis
- 1958–1959 Elton D. Phillips
- 1959–1960 Conrad T. Reibold
- 1960–1961 Donald S. Camphouse
- 1961–1962 Jesse Balser
- 1962–1963 Edward L. Butterworth
- 1963–1964 Elton D. Phillips
- 1964–1965 Dale E. Turner
- 1965–1966 Conrad T. Reibold
- 1966–1967 George Forman
- 1967–1968 Robert J. Considine
- 1968–1969 Don W. Hage
- 1969–1970 C. Robert Arth
- 1970–1971 Edward L. Butterworth
- 1971–1972 James R. Helms
- 1972–1973 Don W. Hage
- 1973–1974 C. Robert Arth
- 1974–1975 Alton E. Scott
- 1975–1976 Charles E. Gilb
- 1976–1977 Floretta K. Lauber – First woman mayor of Arcadia.
- 1977–1978 Jack Saelid
- 1978–1979 David E. Parry
- 1979–1980 Robert G. Margett
- 1980–1981 Donald D. Pellegrino
- 1981–1982 Charles E. Gilb
- 1982–1983 Donald D. Pellegrino
- 1983–1984 Dennis A. Lojeski
- 1984–1985 David S. Hannah
- 1985–1986 Donald D. Pellegrino
- 1986–1987 Mary B. Young
- 1987–1988 Charles E. Gilb
- 1988–1989 Robert C. Harbricht
- 1989–1990 Roger Chandler
- 1990–1991 Mary B. Young
- 1991–1992 Charles E. Gilb
- 1992–1993 George Faching
- 1993–1994 Joseph Ciraulo
- 1994–1995 Mary B. Young
- 1995–1996 Dennis A. Lojeski
- 1996–1997 Barbara D. Kuhn
- 1997–1998 Robert C. Harbricht
- 1998–1999 Gary A. Kovacic
- 1999–2000 Roger Chandler
- 2000–2001 Gary A. Kovacic
- 2001–2002 Mickey Segal
- 2002–2003 Gail A. Marshall
- 2003 Sheng Chang
- 2003 Gary A. Kovacic
- 2003–2004 John Wuo
- 2004 Mickey Segal
- 2004–2005 Gary A. Kovacic
- 2005–2006 John Wuo
- 2006–2007 Roger Chandler
- 2007–2008 Mickey Segal
- 2008–2009 Robert C. Harbricht
- 2010 Peter Amundson
- 2011–2012 Gary A. Kovacic
- 2015–2016 Gary A. Kovacic
- 2016–2017 Tom Beck
- 2017–2018 Peter Amudson
- 2018–2019 Sho Tay
- 2019–2020 April Verlato
- 2020–2021 Rodger Chandler
- 2021–2022 Sho Tay
- 2022–2023 Paul P. Cheng
- 2023–2024 April Verlato
- 2024–2025 Michael Cao
- 2025–2026 Sharon Kwan – First female Asian-American mayor of Arcadia.
- 2026–2026 Eileen Wang
- 2026–Present Paul P. Cheng

=== County government ===
In the Los Angeles County Board of Supervisors, Arcadia is in the Fifth District, represented by Kathryn Barger.

The Los Angeles County Department of Health Services operates the Monrovia Health Center in Monrovia, serving Arcadia.

=== State and federal representation ===
In the California State Legislature, Arcadia is in the 25th senatorial district, represented by Democrat Sasha Renée Pérez, and in the 49th Assembly district, represented by Democrat Mike Fong.

In the United States House of Representatives, Arcadia is in California's 28th congressional district, represented by Democrat Judy Chu.

== Education ==
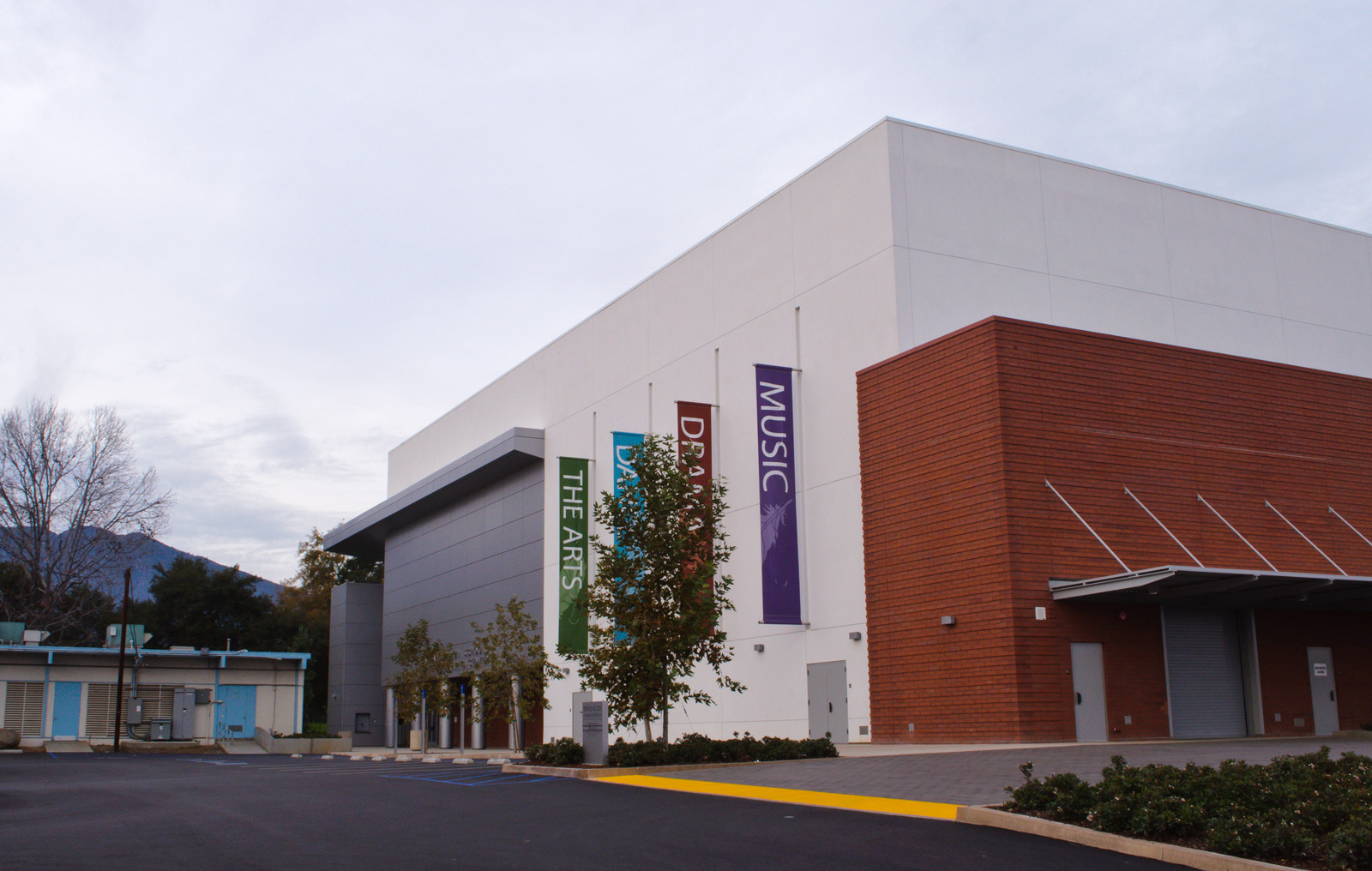
Arcadia High School Performing Arts Center

For primary and secondary education the city is served by the Arcadia Unified School District.

=== Elementary schools ===
- Baldwin Stocker Elementary
- Camino Grove Elementary
- Highland Oaks Elementary
- Holly Avenue Elementary
- Longley Way Elementary
- Reid (Hugo) Elementary

=== Middle schools ===
- Dana (Richard Henry) Middle
- First Avenue Middle
- Foothills Middle

=== High school ===
- Arcadia High School

== Media ==
=== Filming locations ===
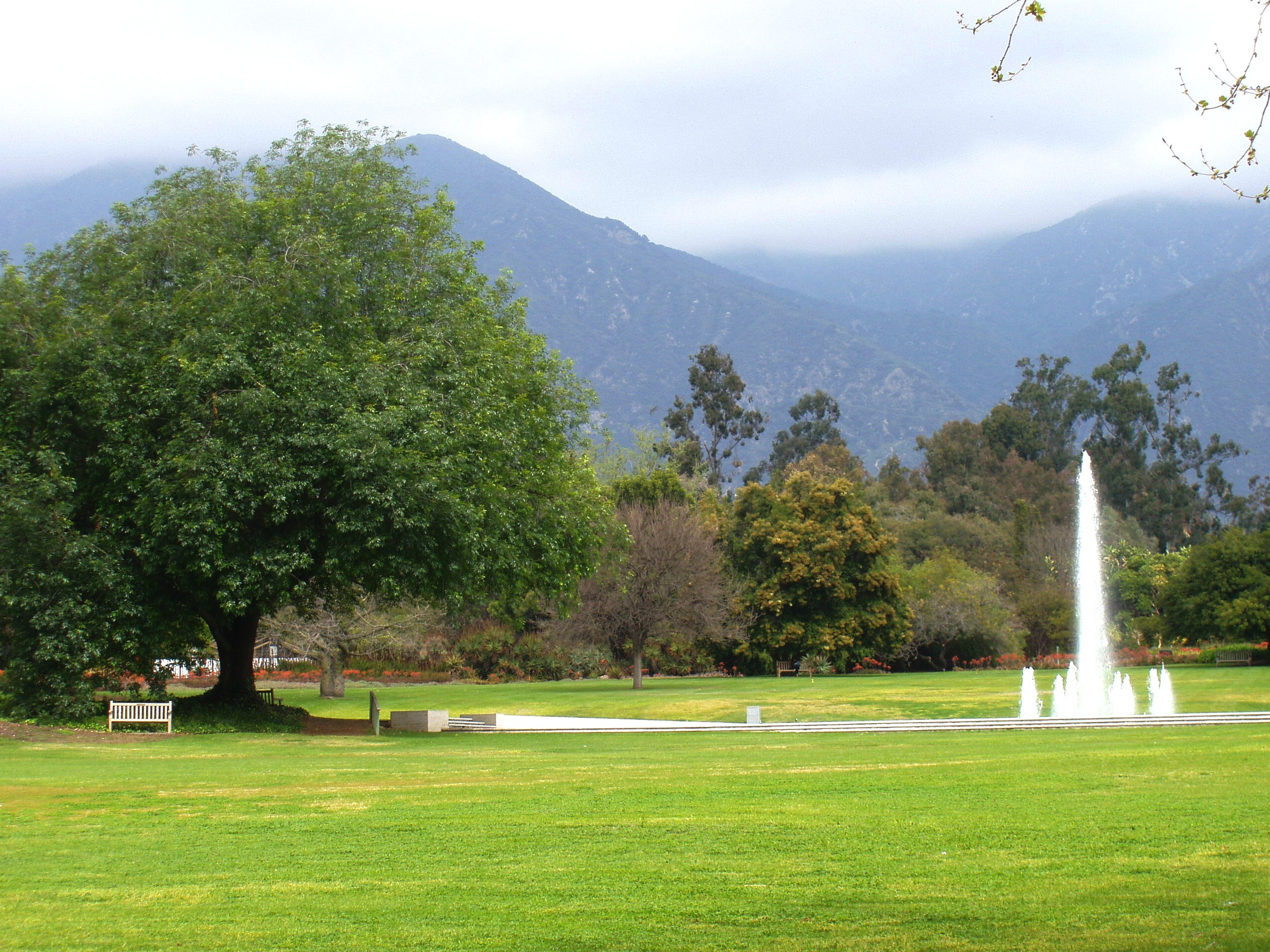
Los Angeles County Arboretum is located on Baldwin Ave.

Location shooting has taken place on the grounds of the Los Angeles County Arboretum and Botanic Garden in Arcadia for many films, including Tarzan and the Bing Crosby On the Road movies, and television series, most notably Fantasy Island. A popular site for fan visits is the house with the bell tower where Tattoo rang the bell, which is the Queen Anne Cottage. The "arrival" of the plane with the guests was filmed in the lagoon behind the Queen Anne Cottage. Outdoor scenes and commercials are still occasionally filmed at the Arboretum.

The Santa Anita Park Racetrack is another popular filming location. The true story film Seabiscuit (2003) takes place at the racetrack and was filmed there. A commercial for Claritin allergy medicine, a Lexus commercial, and three episodes of Grey's Anatomy ("Walk on Water", "Drowning on Dry Land" and "Some Kind of Miracle") have used it as a location.

Arcadia was one of the filming locations for Columbia Pictures' comedy film North (1994).

The fantasy-comedy film Matilda was shot here in 1996.

A scene from Step Brothers (2008) was shot at the nearby Derby restaurant.

Scenes from Mission: Impossible III (2006) were shot at Methodist Hospital.

In the 2008 film Cloverfield, the scene in which the survivors walk inside Bloomingdale's was actually filmed inside a Robinsons-May store under reconstruction inside the Westfield Santa Anita in Arcadia. The film Eagle Eye (2008) was also filmed in this location.

Scenes from Kicking & Screaming (2005) were shot at Foothill Middle School and in Arcadia homes.

Train scenes for the 2013 film The Lone Ranger were filmed at the Santa Anita Race Track parking lot by building an elevated roller coaster-like track.

The comedy film Deal of a Lifetime (1999) was filmed entirely at Arcadia High School.

Moxie (2021) was filmed at Arcadia High School's North Gym and Salter Stadium.

== Infrastructure ==
=== Police and fire ===
The Arcadia Police Department and Arcadia Fire Department serve the city.

=== Transportation ===
Notable roads include Foothill Boulevard, Huntington Drive, and Foothill Freeway (I-210).

==== Transit ====
Arcadia operates three fixed route services, as well as a Dial-A-Ride.

In 2016, Metro opened Arcadia Station, an at-grade light rail station served by the Metro A Line.

=== Healthcare ===
USC Arcadia Hospital sits on 22 acres (89,000 m^{2}) of land. The 460-bed hospital opened in Arcadia in 1957, after moving from downtown Los Angeles. USC Arcadia Hospital was the state's first community hospital to have a psychiatric unit. Its nursery school was one of the first corporate daycare facilities in the U.S. It was an official hospital of the 1984 Olympic Games. The hospital operated its own nursing school from 1915 to 1958.

=== Water and sewer ===
The City of Arcadia provides services for water and sewer to its residents. The city operates its own water distribution system via the Public Works Services Department. Arcadia's water supply comes from groundwater from municipal owned water pumps from the Main San Gabriel Basin and the Raymond Basin, both which are replenished with local rainwater and imported water.

=== Animal services ===
As of 2026 the Pasadena Humane Society contracts with the City of Arcadia for animal services.

== Notable people ==
- Michael Anthony, bassist of the band Van Halen, graduated from Arcadia High School in 1972
- Lauren Barnes, soccer player
- Marty Barrett (born 1958), baseball player
- Ryan Bergara, cohost on Buzzfeed Unsolved and cofounder of Watcher Entertainment
- Harold Budd, music composer and poet
- Tracy Caldwell Dyson, astronaut. Born in Arcadia.
- Jason Chen, singer
- David Cohen (born 1984), jockey
- Jimmy Conrad, soccer player who represented the United States national team
- Sven Davidson, tennis player who won the French Open and Wimbledon
- Genie, a feral child
- John Grabow, major league baseball pitcher
- Jeff Grosso (1968–2020), professional skateboarder
- Phil Hendrie, radio personality, grew up in Arcadia and graduated from Arcadia High School in 1970
- Hua Wenyi (1941-2022), Kunqu performer
- Colleen Kay Hutchins, Miss America 1952, was raised in Arcadia
- Maren Jensen, actress, was born in Arcadia
- Brittany Klein, soccer player
- Rudy Kurniawan, wine swindler
- Jimmy Lambert, baseball player
- Ted Leonard of band Enchant was born in Arcadia
- Jet Li, international film star and martial artist, resided in Arcadia with his wife, a former Miss China
- Johnny Lindell, Major League Baseball player
- Bruce McNall, owned NHL's Los Angeles Kings, was born in Arcadia
- Mirai Nagasu, Olympic figure skater, 6-time medalist in U.S. championships
- Lindsay Price, actress and wife of Curtis Stone
- Jason Robertson, professional hockey player
- Nick Robertson, professional hockey player
- John Speraw, Head Coach US Men's Olympic Volleyball Team
- Mark Tuan, member of South Korean boy-band GOT7, attended Arcadia High School
- Rena Wang, badminton player
- Steve Westly, politician and venture capitalist
- Wil Wheaton, actor, Star Trek: The Next Generation
- George Woolf, horse jockey, owner of The Derby restaurant in Arcadia and rider of Seabiscuit
- Tim Worrell, professional baseball pitcher
- Todd Worrell, professional baseball relief pitcher
- Erica Wu, table tennis Olympian

== Sister cities ==
Arcadia has one sister city (Newcastle, Australia), as designated by Sister Cities International. Consequently, Newcastle Park can be found on Colorado Boulevard. There is also an Arcadia Park in Newcastle.

== See also ==
- Arcadia Invitational
- Hugo Reid Adobe, 1839 California Historic Landmark
- Chinese enclaves in the San Gabriel Valley
