= Parkton, Maryland =

Unincorporated community in Maryland, United States

- Unincorporated community
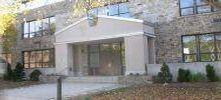
- Hereford High School, in 2004.

- Location within the State of Maryland Parkton (the United States)
- Coordinates: 39°38′27″N 76°39′33″W
- Country: United States
- State: Maryland
- County: Baltimore
- Time zone: UTC−5 (Eastern (EST))
  - Summer (DST): UTC−4 (EDT)
- ZIP Code: 21120
- Area codes: 410, 443, and 667

Parkton is an agrarian unincorporated area in the northern part of Baltimore County, Maryland, United States. It borders southern York County, Pennsylvania, which forms part of the Mason–Dixon line. The area is mostly agricultural in nature with corn, soy beans, and other industrial use crops being the major plants grown.

Approximately 6,600 people live within ZIP Code 21120.

== Notable events ==
It was the location for the filming of the movie Guarding Tess (1994).

The Torrey C. Brown Rail Trail that passes through Parkton used to be the Northern Central Railway that Abraham Lincoln once traveled to Baltimore.

== Schools ==
- Hereford High School
- Our Lady of Grace School
- Seventh District Elementary School

== Transportation ==
=== Highways ===
- I-83
- MD 45

== Climate ==
The climate in this area is characterized by hot, humid summers and generally mild to cool winters. According to the Köppen Climate Classification system, Parkton has a humid subtropical climate, abbreviated "Cfa" on climate maps.
