= Alyeupkigna, California =

Alyeupkigna
- Former settlement
- Location in California
- Coordinates: 34°08′44″N 118°02′59″W
- Country: United States
- State: California
- County: Los Angeles County
- Elevation: 560 ft (170 m)

Alyeupkigna (also, Aleupkigna and Almpquig-na) is a former Tongva-Gabrieleño Native American settlement in Los Angeles County, California.

It was located at Santa Anita, in the San Gabriel Valley, at the base of Little Santa Anita Canyon.

Alyeupkigna Rancheria was established in 1800 as an agricultural outpost of Mission San Gabriel Arcángel. Hugo Reid built an adobe residence beside spring fed Baldwin Lake on the site in 1839–40, and received the full Mexican land grant for Rancho Santa Anita in 1845.

The site is within the present day Los Angeles County Arboretum and Botanic Garden and city of Arcadia.

== See also ==
- Yaanga
- Tongva populated places
  - Tongva language
