= Baldwin Lake (Los Angeles County, California) =

Lake in United States of America

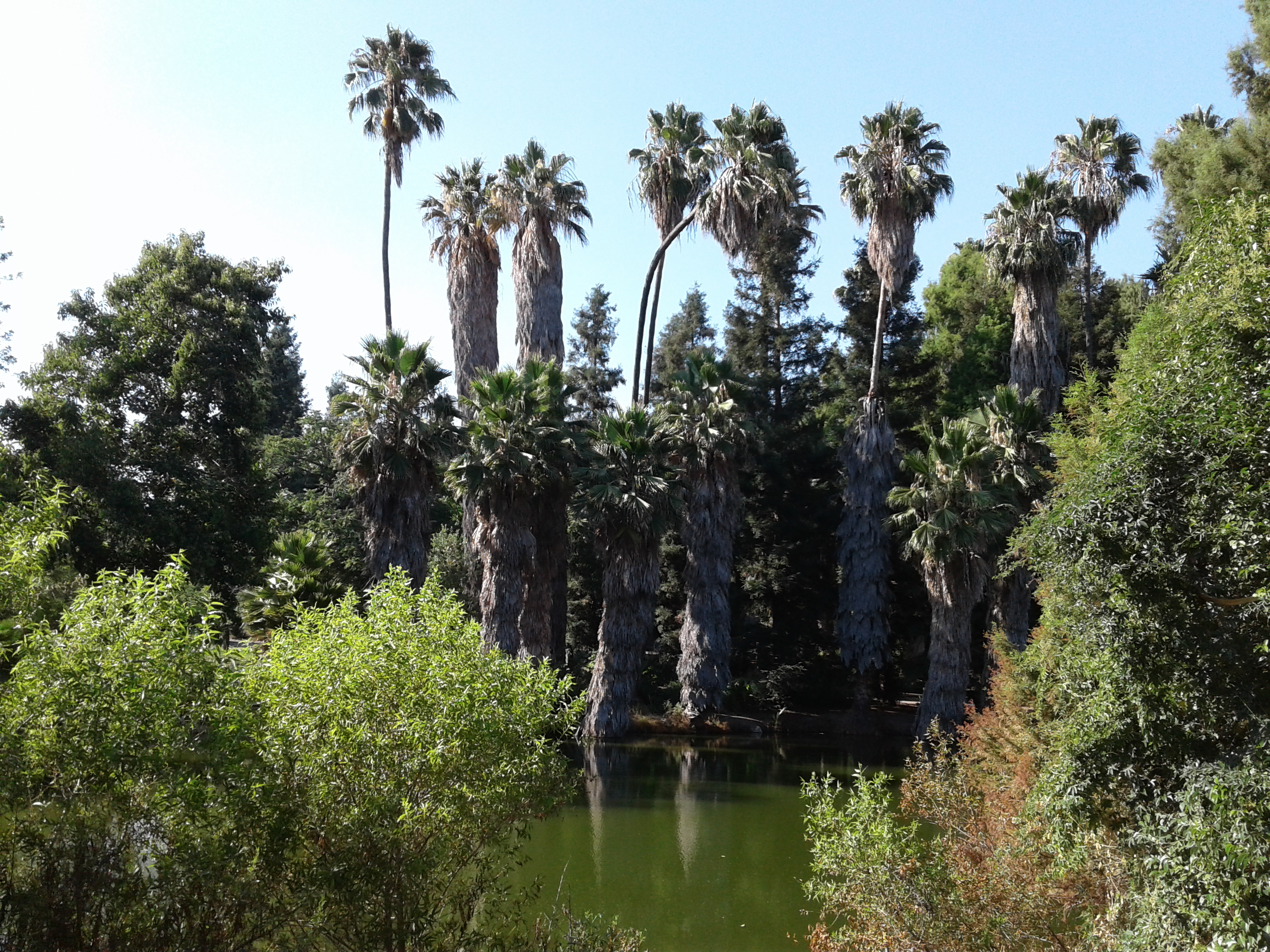
- Looking north across Baldwin Lake from near the Queen Anne Cottage at the Los Angeles County Arboretum and Botanic Garden. California native fan palm trees (Washingtonia filifera) and Mexican fan palm trees (Washingtonia robusta) line the north shore.

- Location within California Location within the United States
- Location: Arcadia, California
- Coordinates: 34°08′31″N 118°03′15″W
- Type: Sag pond
- Primary inflows: Natural springs; Stormwater runoff
- Primary outflows: Aquifer recharge
- Basin countries: United States
- Average depth: 2 feet (0.61 m)
- Max. depth: 30 inches (760 mm) formerly 18 feet (5.5 m)

Baldwin Lake is a sag pond in the Los Angeles County Arboretum and Botanic Garden, which is in the San Gabriel Valley of Southern California, south of the San Gabriel Mountains. The pond, arboretum, and botanic garden are all within the city of Arcadia.

The pond is fed by stormwater and natural springs; water flows out of the pond to the aquifer at Raymond Fault, and on to the Rio Hondo. Baldwin Lake is part of the Los Angeles River watershed.

The area of the pond is about 4 acres (1.6 ha). Silt and pollutants embedded in the pond by surface runoff have reduced its depth from about 12 feet (3.7 m) to 30 inches (760 mm).

== History ==
For hundreds of years before the Spanish colonization of Alta California displaced them in the late 18th century, Tongva people lived near the pond in a settlement called Alyeupkigna. The Spanish forced the Tongva to move to a reduction at the Mission San Gabriel Arcángel. At the site of the Tongva settlement, the Spanish established Alyeupkigna Rancheria in 1800, as an agricultural outpost of the mission.

The Hugo Reid Adobe was built by Scottish−Mexican Hugo Reid on the shore of the pond in 1840. Reid received the full Mexican land grant for Rancho Santa Anita in 1845, with included 'Baldwin Lake' and numerous other artesian sag ponds and springs within its 3 square leagues (13,319 acres).

Elias Jackson "Lucky" Baldwin purchased Rancho Santa Anita in 1875. Baldwin Lake served as a holding reservoir for ranch irrigation projects. It was dredged and deepened, perhaps by 12–15 feet (3.7–4.6 m), by Baldwin in the late 1880s, and a retaining wall capped by granite boulders was built around the shoreline.

Baldwin built the elaborate Coach Barn near the pond in 1879, and the Queen Anne style 'Baldwin's Belvedere' or Santa Anita Ranch Guest Cottage on a peninsula surrounded by the waters in 1885−1886. The Queen Anne Cottage and Coach Barn are listed on the National Register of Historic Places and California Historical Landmarks. The Reid-Baldwin Adobe, remodeled and enlarged by Lucky Baldwin into his main ranch residence, is a California Historical Landmark.

In 1947 the state and county acquired the land to create an arboretum around the pond and historic Baldwin structures.

== Wildlife ==
Baldwin Lake is the home for many different forms of wildlife including numerous ducks, Canada geese and turtles. There are also occasional egrets and great blue herons.

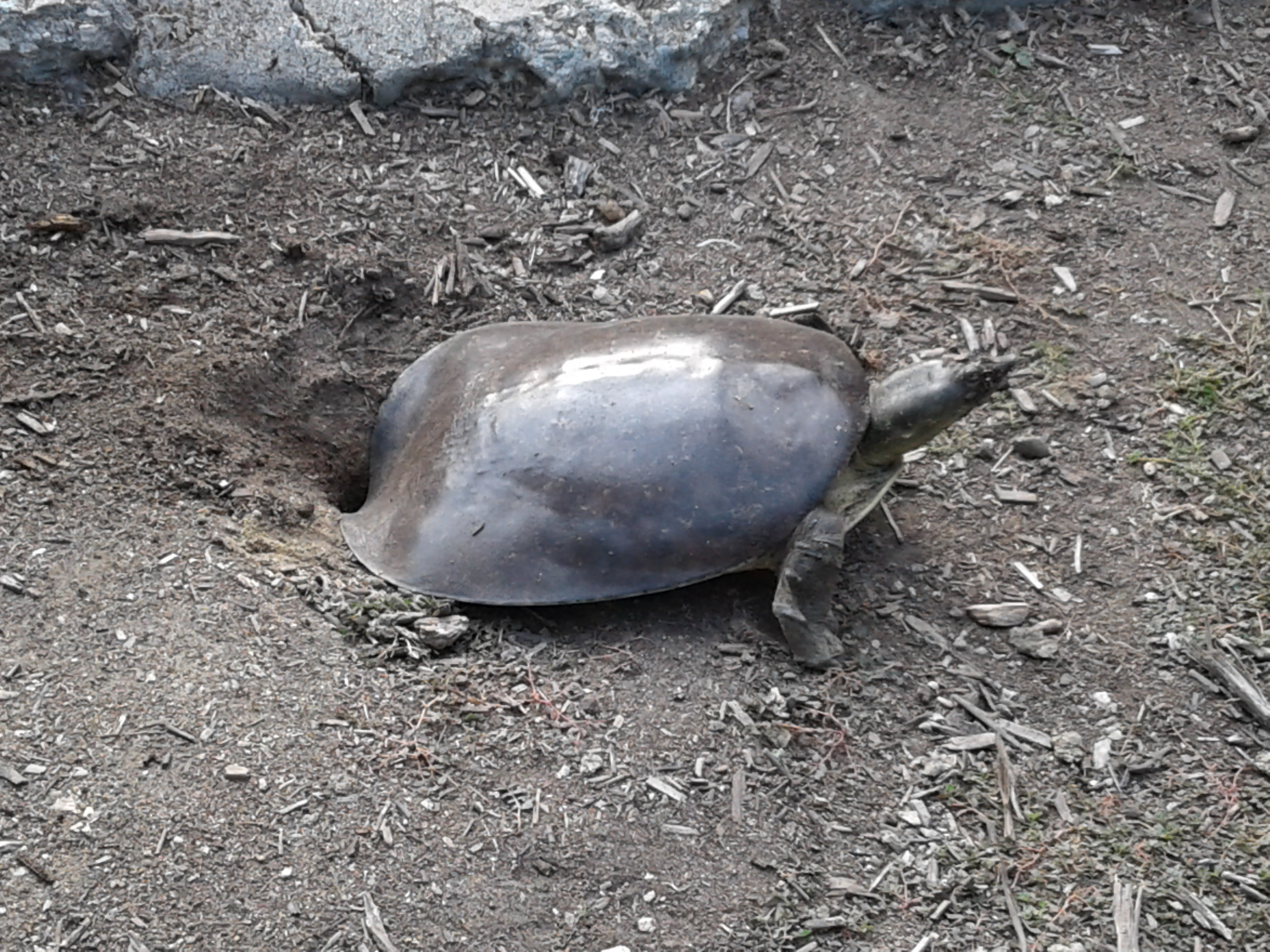
Spiny softshell turtle (Apalone spinifera) laying eggs along the East bank of Baldwin Lake.

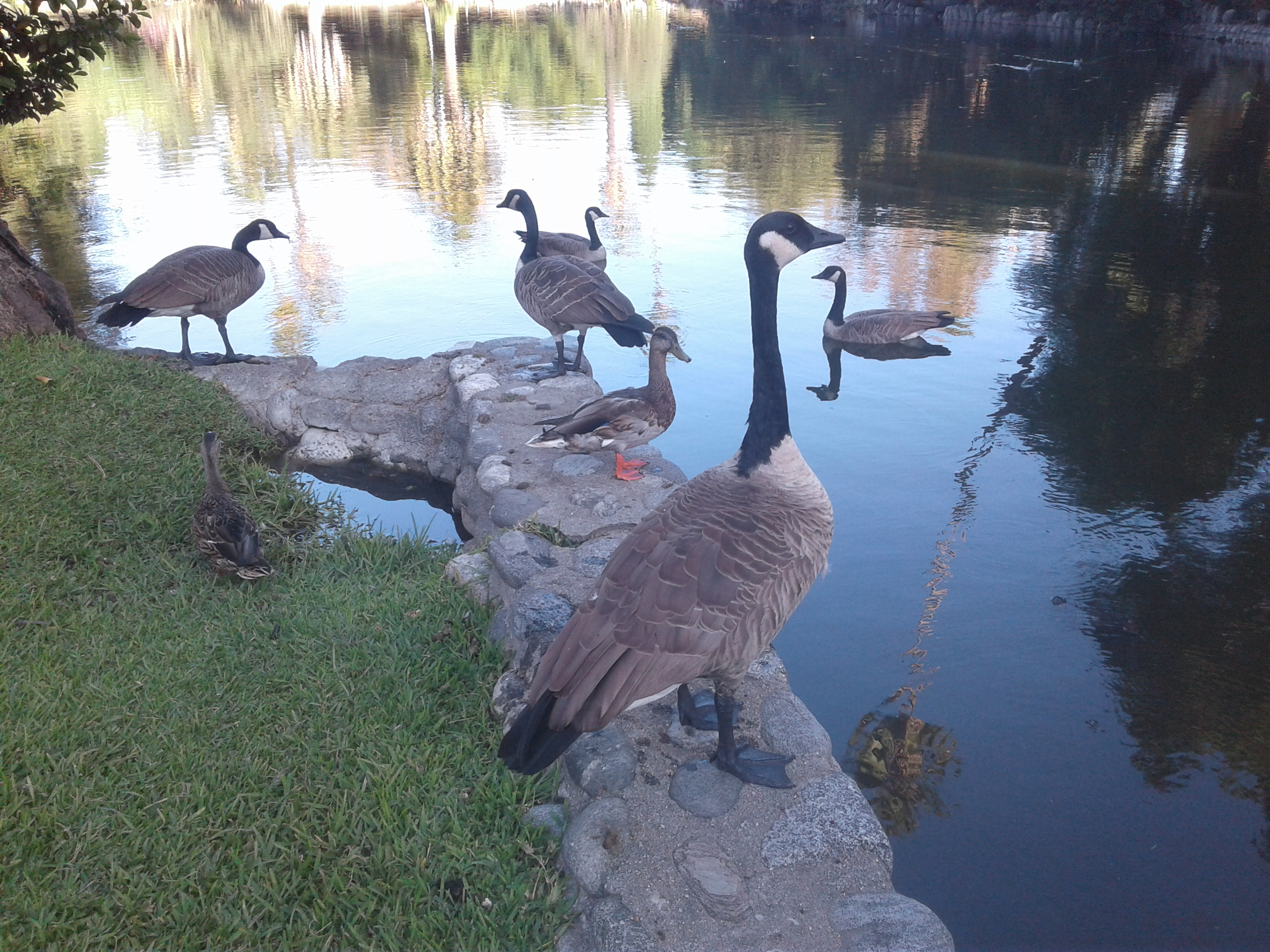
Canada geese and ducks on Baldwin Lake in late summer.

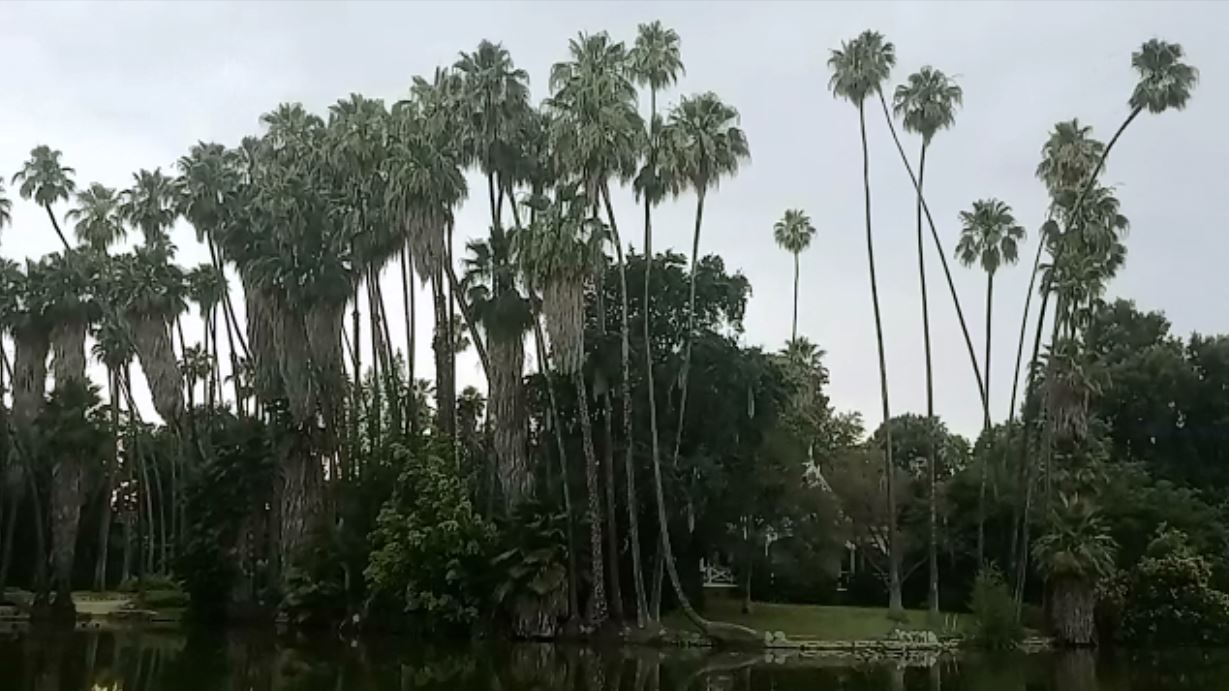
Raining at Baldwin Lake with ducks, turtles, and tall Mexican fan palm trees. https://www.youtube.com/watch?v=O9M2dKBcwmk

== Pollution ==
The Save Baldwin Lake project is currently accessing how to address accumulated sediments, collapsing shorelines, reduced water depth, Raymond aquifer recharging, and the threatened aquatic ecosystems of Baldwin Lake and adjacent Tule Pond.

A preliminary study identified several factors that negatively impact Baldwin Lake. Since the early 1950s, the Lake has functioned as a collection basis for 155 acres (63 ha) of urban watershed to the north. The runoff carrying petrochemicals and other contaminants into the pond, combined with ongoing siltation, has degraded its aquatic ecosystems. The pond was originally 15–8 feet (4.6–2.4 m) deep, but now has an average depth of 24 inches (61 cm).

The Arboretum began fundraising for an engineering study to determine the best approaches to restoring Baldwin Lake and Tule Pond.

== In popular culture ==
Some of the early scenes of the 1941 Preston Sturges film, The Lady Eve, were filmed at Baldwin Lake.

== See also ==
- Lakes of Los Angeles County, California
- Arcadia, California topics
- Baldwin Avenue Railway Station
- National Register of Historic Places listings in Los Angeles County, California
