= Queen Anne Cottage and Coach Barn =

Historic house in California, United States

- U.S. National Register of Historic Places
- California Historical Landmark No. 367
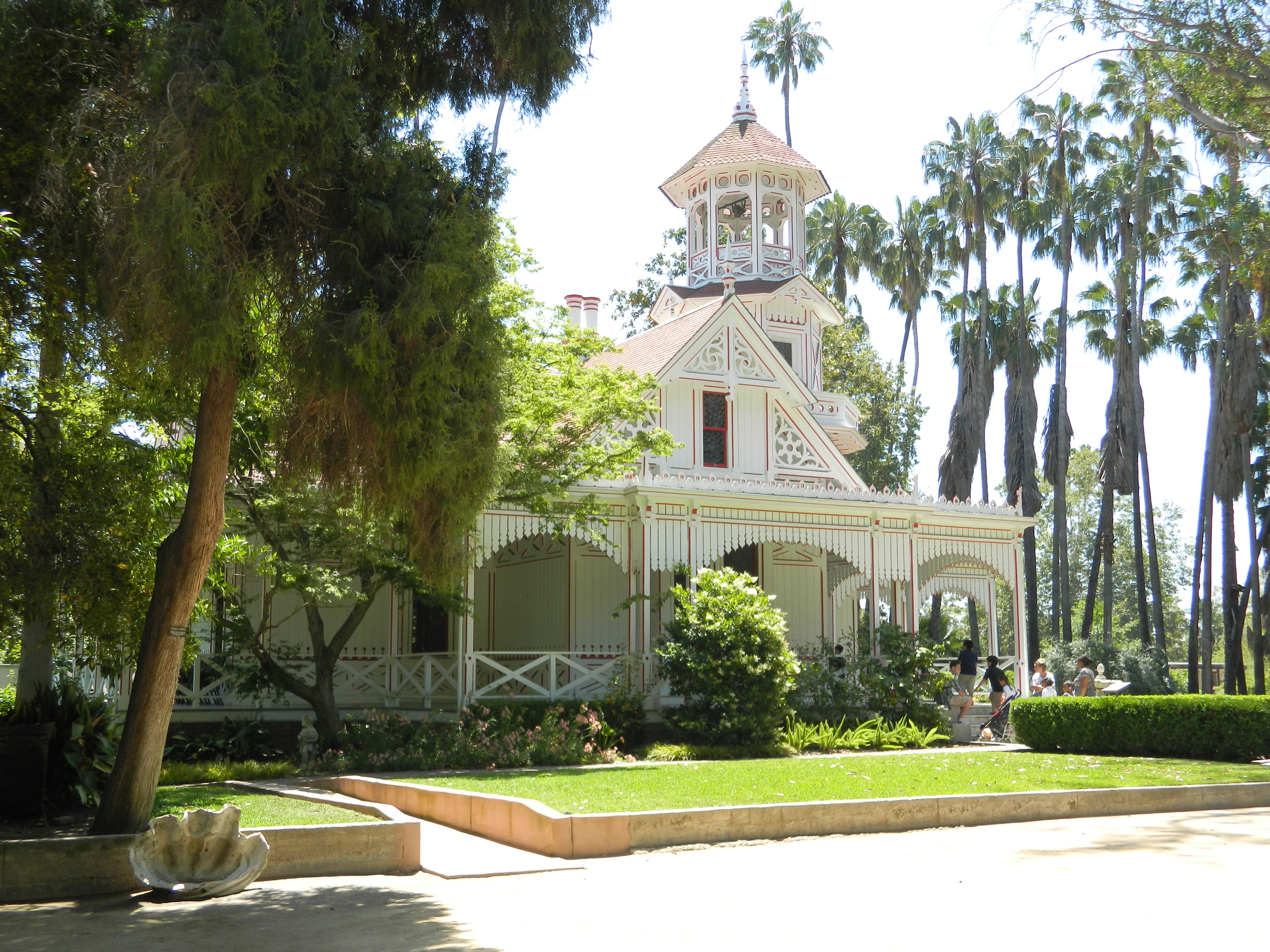

- Location within the Los Angeles metropolitan area Location within California Location within the United States
- Location: 301 N. Baldwin Ave., Arcadia, California
- Coordinates: 34°8′29″N 118°3′13″W
- Area: 9.3 acres (3.8 ha)
- Built: 1879 (coach barn), 1885−1886 (cottage)
- Architect: Albert A. Bennett
- Architectural style: Stick/Eastlake, Queen Anne, Storybook Cottage
- NRHP reference No.: 80000804
- CHISL No.: 367
- Added to NRHP: October 31, 1980

Queen Anne Cottage and Coach Barn is a Victorian style pair of buildings at Baldwin Lake, on the grounds of the Los Angeles County Arboretum and Botanic Garden, located in Arcadia and the San Gabriel Valley of southern California.

Elias Jackson "Lucky" Baldwin built the elaborate Coach Barn near the pond in 1879, and 'Baldwin's Belvedere' or the Santa Anita Ranch Guest Cottage on a peninsula in the pond in 1885−1886. They are a California Historical Landmark, and were placed on the National Register of Historic Places for their significance as examples of Queen Anne Style architecture and for the associated, largely intact Victorian landscape design gardens.

== Cottage ==
The cottage was constructed in 1885-1886 for Baldwin and his third wife, Lillie Bennett, the daughter of the cottage's architect Albert A. Bennett. Upon E.J.'s death in 1909, his daughter Anita closed the cottage and disposed of all furnishings. Some of the architectural elements of the cottage, such as the stained glass windows, black walnut doors, and marble fireplace mantels were stored in the coach barn. The stored items were reinstalled in the cottage during the 1951-1953 restoration.

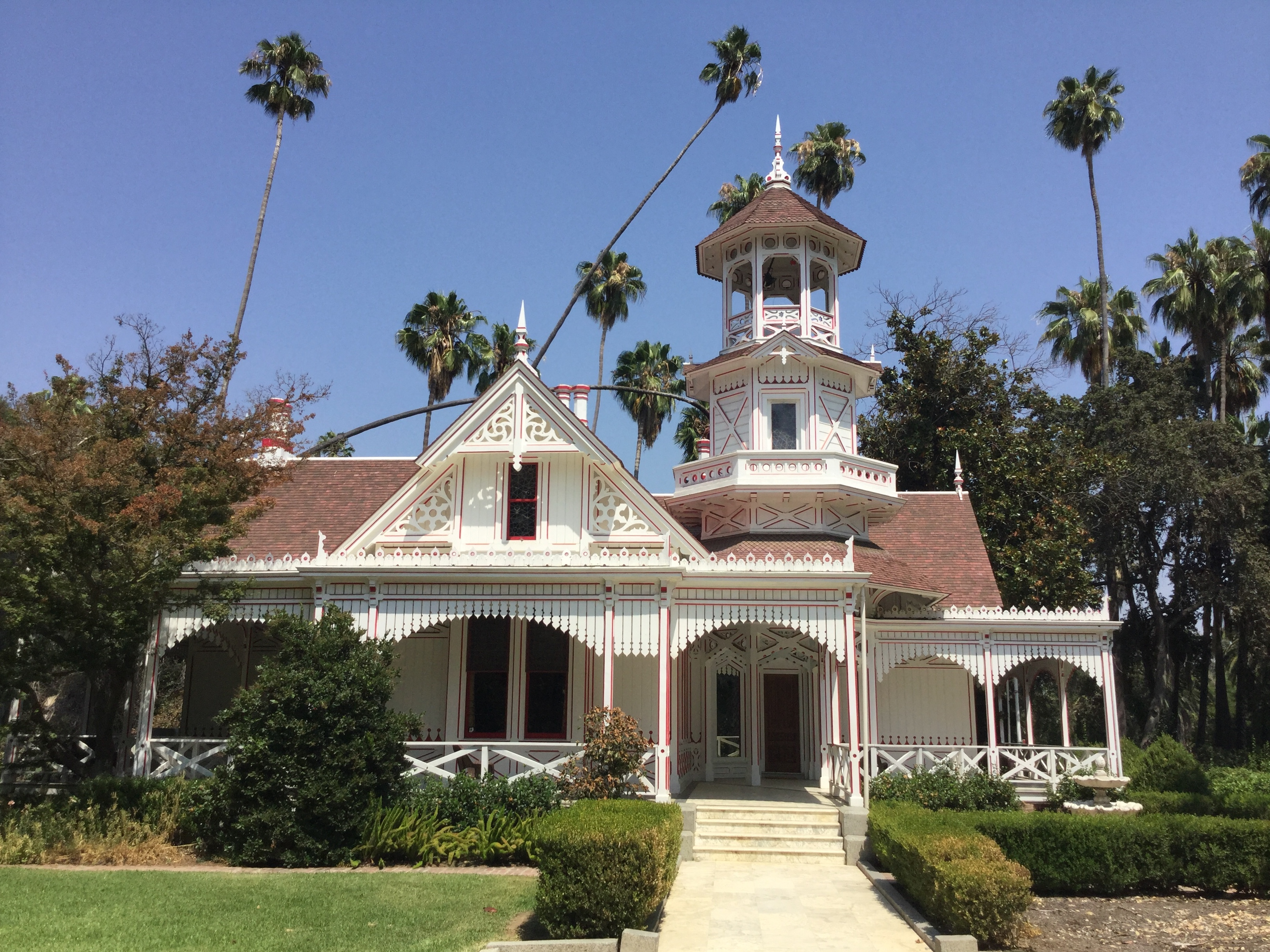

In 1993 the "X"-pattern fencing around the Queen Anne Cottage was refurbished and repaired as part of an Eagle Scout project by Erik Wanson, a member of Boy Scout Troop 351 in San Marino, California.

== Appearances in popular culture ==
The cottage has been used for numerous films and television shows, most famously for the opening of Fantasy Island where the character of Tattoo can be seen ringing the bell in the cottage's tower and Mr. Roarke is seen exiting from it.

The cottage was featured in Visiting... with Huell Howser Episode 1018.

The house was also used recently for a season two episode of American Horror Stories entitled "Dollhouse" that aired in 2022. One of the main characters, Coby Rae Dellum (Kristine Froseth) can be seen looking from the tower window below where Tattoo famously rang the bell on Fantasy Island (although a different side of the cottage was used in the episode).

== Historic house museums ==
Public tours of the Cottage are available only one or two days each year.

The 1840 Hugo Reid Adobe of Mexican era Rancho Santa Anita, later Baldwin's main ranch house, is also on Baldwin Lake within the Arboretum.

== California Historical Landmark Marker ==
California Historical Landmark Marker NO. 367 at the site reads:

- NO. 367 E. J. BALDWIN'S QUEEN ANNE COTTAGE - Designed by A. A. Bennett for entertaining, the cottage was constructed by Elias Jackson ('Lucky') Baldwin in 1881. Since there was no kitchen, meals were served from the nearby adobe (built by Hugo Reid in 1839) where Baldwin actually lived. The building was restored and dedicated May 18, 1954 as part of Los Angeles State and County Arboretum.
