= Fantasy Island =

American fantasy drama television series (1977–1984)

- Title card of the first installment of Fantasy Island
- Genre: Fantasy; Drama
- Created by: Gene Levitt
- Starring: Ricardo Montalbán; Hervé Villechaize; Wendy Schaal; Christopher Hewett
- Country of origin: United States
- Original language: English
- No. of seasons: 7
- No. of episodes: 152, plus 2 TV movies (list of episodes)

Production
- Running time: 45–48 minutes
- Production companies: Spelling-Goldberg Productions; Columbia Pictures Television

Original release
- Network: ABC
- Release: January 28, 1978 – May 19, 1984

Fantasy Island is an American fantasy drama television series created by Gene Levitt. It aired on ABC from 1977 to 1984. The series starred Ricardo Montalbán as the mysterious Mr. Roarke and, until the end of Season 6, Hervé Villechaize as his assistant, Tattoo. In each episode guests to the island are granted the realization of so-called "fantasies" — for a price.

A one-season revival of the series aired in 1998, and a horror-themed prequel film was released on February 14, 2020. The same year, it was announced that a sequel of the series was being produced at Fox; it premiered on August 10, 2021 and was canceled in May 2023 after two seasons.

== Background ==
Before it became a television series, Fantasy Island was introduced to viewers in 1977 and 1978 through two made-for-television films. Airing from 1978 to 1984, the original series starred Ricardo Montalbán as Mr. Roarke, the enigmatic overseer of a mysterious island somewhere near Devil's Island, French Guiana, in the Atlantic Ocean, where people from all walks of life can come and live out their fantasies—for a price.

Roarke is known for his white suit and cultured demeanor, and he was initially accompanied by an energetic midget sidekick, Tattoo, played by Hervé Villechaize. Tattoo runs up the main bell tower to ring the bell and shout "De plane! De plane!" to warn the staff of the arrival of new guests at the beginning of each episode. This line, shown at the beginning of the credits sequence, became a catchphrase because of Villechaize's characteristic enunciation. In later seasons, Tattoo arrives in a go-kart, sized for him, recklessly driving to join Roarke for the visitor reception while the staff scramble out of his way. From 1981 to 1982, Wendy Schaal joined the cast as an assistant named Julie; in the season five story "The Case Against Mr. Roarke", Roarke says that Julie is his goddaughter. The producers dismissed Villechaize from the series before the 1983–84 season, its last, and the Tattoo character was replaced by a more sedate butler type named Lawrence, played by Christopher Hewett, who presses an electronic button to ring the bell rather than climb up the tower.

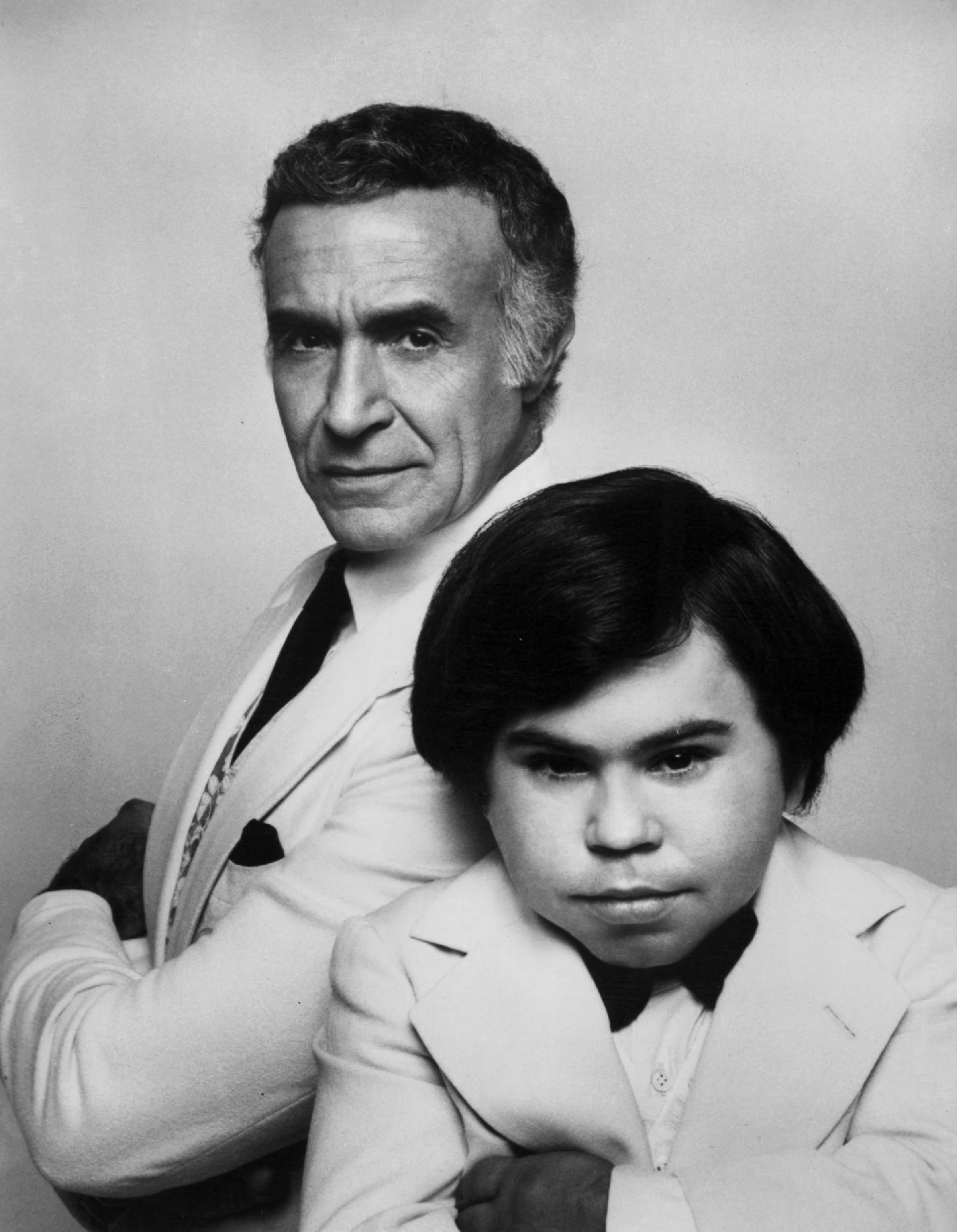
Mr. Roarke and Tattoo

A Grumman Widgeon aircraft was used for the series. Just before guests alight from the plane, Mr. Roarke addresses his assembling employees with the phrase "Smiles, everyone! Smiles!" As each visitor disembarks, Roarke tells Tattoo (or another assistant) the nature of their fantasy, usually with a cryptic comment, suggesting the person's fantasy will not turn out as they expect. Roarke then welcomes his guests by lifting his glass and saying: "My dear guests, I am Mr. Roarke, your host. Welcome to Fantasy Island." The toast is usually followed by a warm smile, but sometimes—depending on the nature of a guest or their fantasy—his eyes show concern or worry for a guest's safety.

Mr. Roarke's age is unclear. In the pilot film, he says that the guests who come to his island are "so mortal", and there are hints throughout the series that Roarke himself may not be mortal. In "Elizabeth", a woman from Roarke's past appears, but it is revealed that she died over 300 years ago. Other episodes suggest that he was friends with Helen of Troy and Cleopatra. Roarke is also shown to have been acquainted with many seemingly immortal beings, including ghosts ("The Ghost's Story"), a genie ("A Genie Named Joe"), the mermaid Princess Nyah ("The Mermaid", "The Mermaid Returns", "The Mermaid and the Matchmaker"), the goddess Aphrodite ("Aphrodite"), and Uriel the Angel of Death ("The Angel's Triangle"). In "The Devil and Mandy Breem" and "The Devil and Mr. Roarke", Roarke faces the Devil (played by Roddy McDowall), who has come to the island to challenge him for possession of a person's soul (in the latter storyline, the soul on the line is that of Julie). It is mentioned that this is not the first time that they have confronted each other, and that Mr. Roarke has always been the winner. In the second story, the Devil is one of the island's guests, claiming that he has only come to relax and has no interest in Roarke's soul, but this turns out to be a ruse.

Roarke has a strong moral code, and is always merciful. He usually tries to teach his guests important life lessons through the medium of their fantasies, often in a manner that exposes the errors of their ways. On occasions when a guest is terminally ill he allows them to live out one last wish. The fantasy realizations are not without peril, but the greatest danger is usually presented by the guests themselves. In some cases, people are killed due to their own negligence, aggression, or arrogance. Roarke often intervenes when the fantasy became dangerous to the guest. Examples include:

- In one episode when Tattoo is granted the realization of his own fantasy as a birthday gift, which ends up with him being chased by hostile natives in canoes, Mr. Roarke suddenly appears in a motorboat, snares Tattoo's canoe with a grappling hook and tows it away at high speed in order to rescue him.
- In the 1979 episode "The Mermaid; The Victim", a female guest seeking to fall in love with her dream man ends up as one of his sex slaves. When she and her fellow slaves manage to get free, they are saved by Mr. Roarke and Tattoo who have arrived with the police who then arrest the two men responsible.
- In the 1980 episode "With Affection, Jack the Ripper; Gigolo", a female guest intent on researching Jack the Ripper's crimes is sent back in time to 1888 London, and risks becoming one of the Ripper's victims, but Roarke intervenes.

On other occasions Roarke asserts that he is powerless to stop a fantasy once it has begun and that the guest must play it out to its conclusion.

In later seasons, there are often supernatural overtones. Roarke also seems to have supernatural powers of some sort (called the "Gift of the McNabs" in "Delphine"), although it is never explained how this came to be. In the episodes "Reprisal" and "The Power" he temporarily gives the guest psychokinetic abilities and, in "Terrors of the Mind", the power to see into the future. In one episode, when a guest says "Thank God things worked out well", Roarke and Tattoo share an odd look and Roarke says in a cryptic way "Thank God, indeed." In the same episode, Roarke uses some mysterious powers to help Tattoo with his magic act. Ricardo Montalbán would claim in interviews that he had a definite opinion regarding the mystery of Mr. Roarke and how he created the guests' experiences, but he would never publicly state what it was. Years after the series was off the air, in an interview with the Academy of Television Arts and Sciences, Montalbán finally revealed that he imagined Roarke to be a fallen angel who had committed the sin of pride and had been sentenced to Fantasy Island as his Purgatory.

Each episode would alternate between two or three independent storylines as the guests experienced their fantasies and interacted with Roarke. When reruns of the series went into syndication, half-hour versions were offered, where each hour-long original episode was split into two half-hour-long episodes in each of which only one guest's story was told.

Aside from a clip show ("Remember...When?") the only episode with a single storyline is "The Wedding", in which terminally ill Helena Marsh (Samantha Eggar) returns to Fantasy Island to spend her last days as Roarke's wife.

Another episode, "Nurses' Night Out" (from the show's seventh season) is the only episode where all of the fantasies, while separate, are linked by one thread. In this case, a mysterious and wealthy guest (Peter Graves) invites three nurses to live out their fantasies on the island.

Typical episodes featured adult guests. However, in two episodes aired in Season 2 that were broadcast on early Sunday night, called Fantasy Island Sunday Special, children arrive at the island by hot-air balloon to live out fantasies appropriate to their age.

It is mentioned a few times that a condition of visiting Fantasy Island is that guests never reveal what goes on there.

A small number of guests decide to make the irrevocable choice to stay permanently, living out their fantasy until death. One example is an actor who had been in a Tarzan-type television series called "Jungle Man" in the 1960s.

=== The fantasy ===
==== Cost ====
In the first film, Fantasy Island (1977), it is noted that each guest had paid $50,000 (about $207,000 in 2025 dollars) in advance for the fulfillment of their fantasies and that Fantasy Island is a business. In the second film, Return to Fantasy Island (1978), Roarke tells Tattoo that he sometimes drops the price when a guest cannot afford the usual fee, because he believes that everyone should be given a chance to have their fantasies fulfilled. Afterwards, it becomes clear that the price a guest paid was substantial to them, and for one little girl whose father was one of Roarke's guests, she had emptied her piggy bank (which contained less than $10) to have her fantasy with her father fulfilled. On numerous occasions, a guest had not paid for the trip at all, but instead won it as a result of a contest. Those who come by winning contests are usually the unknowing beneficiaries of rigged contests in order to disguise to them and others the real reason for their coming as part of someone else's fantasy.

==== Nature ====
The nature of a fantasy varied from story to story and was typically very personal to each guest on some level. They could be as harmless as wanting to be reunited with a lost love to something more dangerous like tracking down a cold-blooded killer who murdered someone close to the guest. Usually, the fantasy would take an unexpected turn and proceed down a quite different path than the guest expected. Some resolve in "The Monkey's Paw" style. They would then leave with some new revelation or renewed interest about themselves or someone close to them. Many times, Roarke would reveal in the end that someone they met during the course of their fantasy was another guest living a fantasy of their own. Both guests often left the island together. However, in one episode, one guest had no particular fantasy and was simply there to relax and enjoy himself. In another episode, the fantasy of one guest (played by Don Knotts) was to play the part of a private investigator. At the end of the episode, he discovers that his "suspects" were actually a company of actors who had asked Mr. Roarke to act out their whodunnit play in a realistic setting.

Although some fantasies were rooted in the real world, many others involved supernatural (such as ghosts, demons, or witchcraft) or mythological (mermaids, genies, goddesses) elements. Time travel was often a required element, if not a specific request, to fulfill one's fantasy.

==== Risk ====
Roarke often preceded particularly risky fantasies with a stern warning, a word of caution, or even a suggestion that the guest select another fantasy, instead. He would then inform his guests that he was powerless to stop a fantasy once it had begun and that they must allow the fantasy to play out until its ultimate conclusion. Despite this, on rare occasions, Roarke would appear halfway through a fantasy to offer a guest one more opportunity to terminate their fantasy, warning that continuing the current fantasy might lead to serious consequences, possibly even death. However, at that point, the guest would decide on their own to see the fantasy to its end, either for selfless reasons (regarding someone they had met during the fantasy) or naïveté of what is in store for them. In the most serious cases, however, Roarke would invariably intervene and ensure his guests' safety.

Occasionally, some of the fantasies would take place on adjoining islands or parts of Fantasy Island that, according to Roarke, he had no jurisdiction over, thereby heightening the risk factor for the guests. Even then, when Roarke intervened in these cases, he often revealed that he had close connections with the local officials or prominent figures on those islands, who would grant him authority to rescue his guests.

== Episodes ==
Season	Episodes	Originally released		Rank	Rating
Season	Episodes	First released	Last released	Rank	Rating
TV movies	2	January 14, 1977	January 20, 1978	—N/a	—N/a
1	14	January 28, 1978	May 20, 1978	17	21.4 (Note: Tied with Barney Miller)
2	25	September 16, 1978	May 13, 1979	22	20.8
3	23	September 17, 1979	May 17, 1980	28	20.1
4	24	October 25, 1980	May 23, 1981	17	20.7 (Note: Tied with Trapper John, M.D. and Diff'rent Strokes)
5	22	October 10, 1981	May 8, 1982	30	18.3
6	22	October 16, 1982	May 14, 1983	37	—N/a
7	22	October 8, 1983	May 19, 1984	49	15.3

== Production notes ==
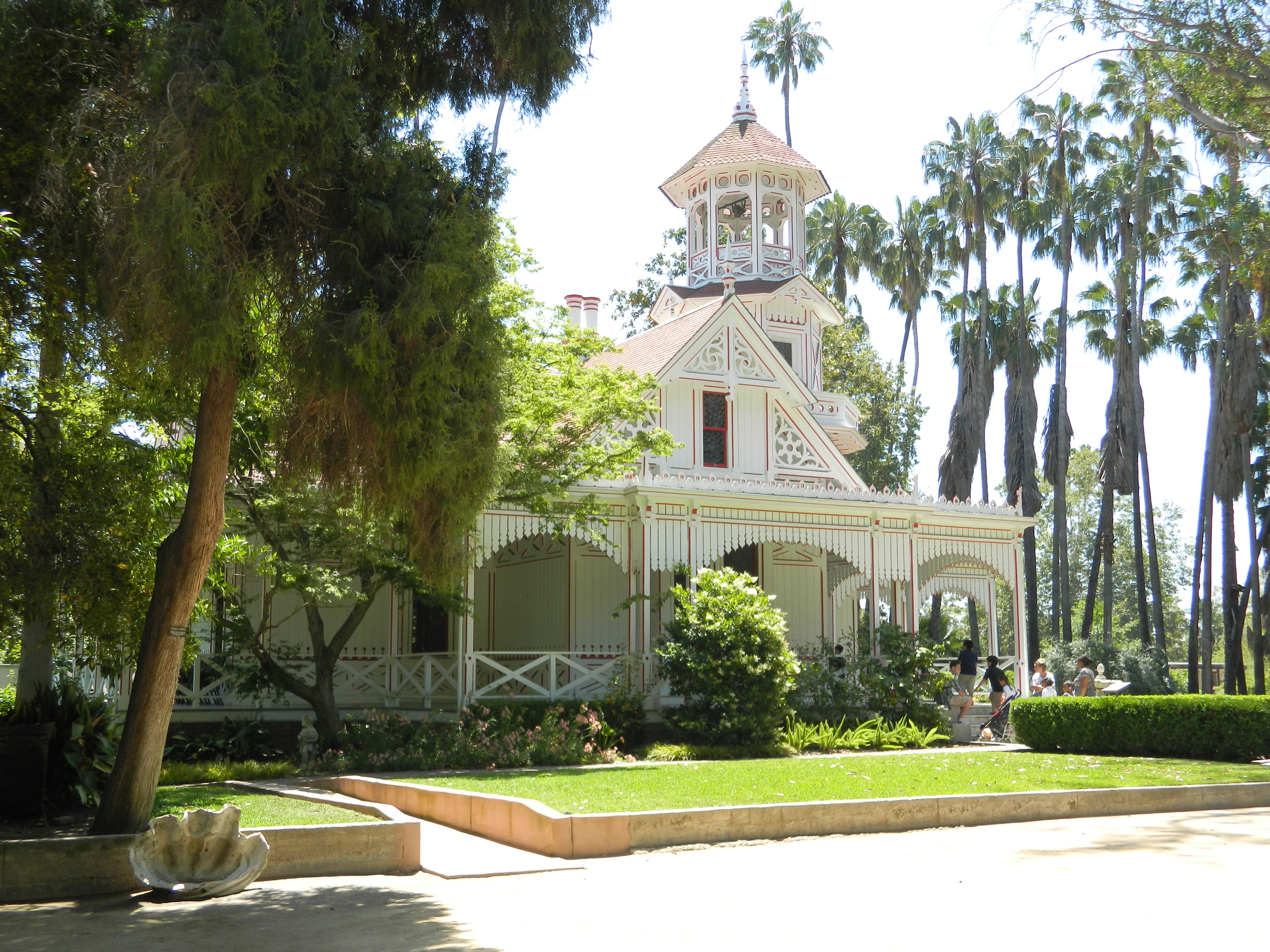
Queen Anne Cottage and Coach Barn in Arcadia, California

Executive producer Aaron Spelling admitted the original pitch was a joke. Spelling said he and production partner Leonard Goldberg were pitching ideas to ABC executive Brandon Stoddard. After the executive rejected all of their plans, at least six in all, Spelling blurted out: "What do you want? An island that people can go to and all of their sexual fantasies will be realized?" Stoddard loved the idea.

The network wanted Orson Welles for Mr. Roarke, but Spelling rejected him, knowing of his irritable nature on sets. He also rejected the idea of a sexy female sidekick to join Roarke and Tattoo.

The show was broadcast every Saturday night on ABC at 10:00 p.m., after The Love Boat, which was also produced by Aaron Spelling. Like several other series of the era, such as The Love Boat and Murder, She Wrote, Fantasy Island employed many celebrity guest stars, often bringing them back repeatedly for different roles.

=== Filming locations ===
The series was filmed primarily in Burbank, California, with the opening scenes of the enchanting island coastline that of Kauai, Hawaii (the Na Pali coast and Wailua Falls). The house with the bell tower, where Tattoo rings the bell, is the Queen Anne Cottage, in the Los Angeles County Arboretum and Botanic Garden in Arcadia. The plane, "arriving" with the guests, was filmed in the lagoon behind the Queen Anne Cottage. Sometimes, outdoor scenes were filmed at the Arboretum.

Interior sets were filmed on Stages 26 and 17 at Warner Bros. Studios in Burbank. At some point, the production of exterior scenes moved to the Warner Ranch a short distance away from Warner's main lot. B-roll was taken from the Coco Palms Resort in Kauai.

=== Music ===
The Fantasy Island theme music was composed by Laurence Rosenthal.

== Other projects ==
=== 1998 revival series ===
In 1998, ABC revived the series in a Saturday time slot. The role of Mr. Roarke was played by Malcolm McDowell in the revival, and in contrast to the first series the supernatural aspect of his character and of Fantasy Island itself was emphasized from the start, along with a dose of dark humor. Director Barry Sonnenfeld, known for his work on The Addams Family movies, was a chief creative force on the new series. Another difference was that the new series was filmed in Hawaii instead of California. The remake followed the fantasies of at least two of Roarke's guests with an additional subplot involving members of his staff – usually Cal and Harry. Whereas the original series featured a separate writer and title for each subplot, the new series was written as several stories, but featuring a unified theme and title.

=== 2020 horror prequel film adaptation ===
A horror-themed prequel film adaptation of the television series starring Michael Peña as Mr. Roarke was released by Sony Pictures and produced by Blumhouse Productions. Director and screenwriter Jeff Wadlow directed the adaptation from a script by Wadlow, Chris Roach, and Jillian Jacobs. The film was released on February 14, 2020, to overwhelmingly negative reviews.

=== 2021 Fox sequel series ===
A series was greenlit in December 2020 as a sequel to and maintains continuity with the original 1977 series, slated for a mid 2021 release on Fox. The series was a co-production between Sony Pictures Television and Fox Entertainment. In April 2021, it was announced that Kiara Barnes and John Gabriel Rodriguez were cast, as part of the main cast of the series. That same month, it was announced that Roselyn Sánchez joined the cast of the series as Elena Roarke, a descendant of Mr. Roarke. The series premiered on August 10, 2021, and aired for two seasons.

== Syndication ==
Selected episodes from the first, second and third seasons are available free at Hulu. Selected Minisodes from seasons one, three, four, five, and six are available free at Sony Crackle, along with complete episodes from seasons one, two, and three.

Digital multicast television network Cozi TV announced the series would be airing on the network beginning fall 2013. Episodes of the original series were seen on Fridays on sister cable network Universal HD, until July 2017, when the network changed to the Olympic Channel.

In Canada, the entire series with all seven seasons is available for streaming on the CTV App, with the first five seasons remastered in High Definition, the first three seasons have been enhanced to 1.78:1 aspect ratio.

In May 2021, it was added to the streaming service Tubi, with all seven seasons.

In August 2021, it started airing on digital multicast television network getTV on Saturday and Sunday nights (4:00 am ET).

In January 2026, it started airing on MeTV on Sunday afternoons as part of an Aaron Spelling–themed block which also reunited the show with its former ABC counterpart The Love Boat.

== Home media ==
In 1988, Star Classics released the pilot episode of the series on VHS in the United States and Canada.

In 2005, Sony Pictures Home Entertainment released season one of the original series on DVD in regions 1, 2 & 4. The release included the 1977 pilot Fantasy Island and 1978's Return to Fantasy Island. However, due to poor sales, no further seasons were released.

In February 2012, it was announced that Shout! Factory had acquired the rights to the series in Region 1; they subsequently released the second season on DVD on May 8, 2012. Season 3 was released on October 23, 2012.

In 2013, Mill Creek Entertainment announced they had obtained the rights to re-release the previous season sets of Fantasy Island on DVD.

DVD Name	Ep #	Release date		
DVD Name	Ep #	Region 1	Region 2 (UK & Ireland)	Region 4
The Complete First Season	16	November 15, 2005	December 10, 2007	December 2, 2015
The Complete Second Season	25	May 8, 2012	TBA	TBA
The Complete Third Season	23	October 23, 2012	TBA	TBA
