= Santa Anita, California =

Santa Anita is a USGS place name within the city of Arcadia in Los Angeles County, California. Formerly within Rancho Santa Anita, it lies at an elevation of 558 feet (170 m).
