= Reid-Baldwin Adobe =

California historic landmark

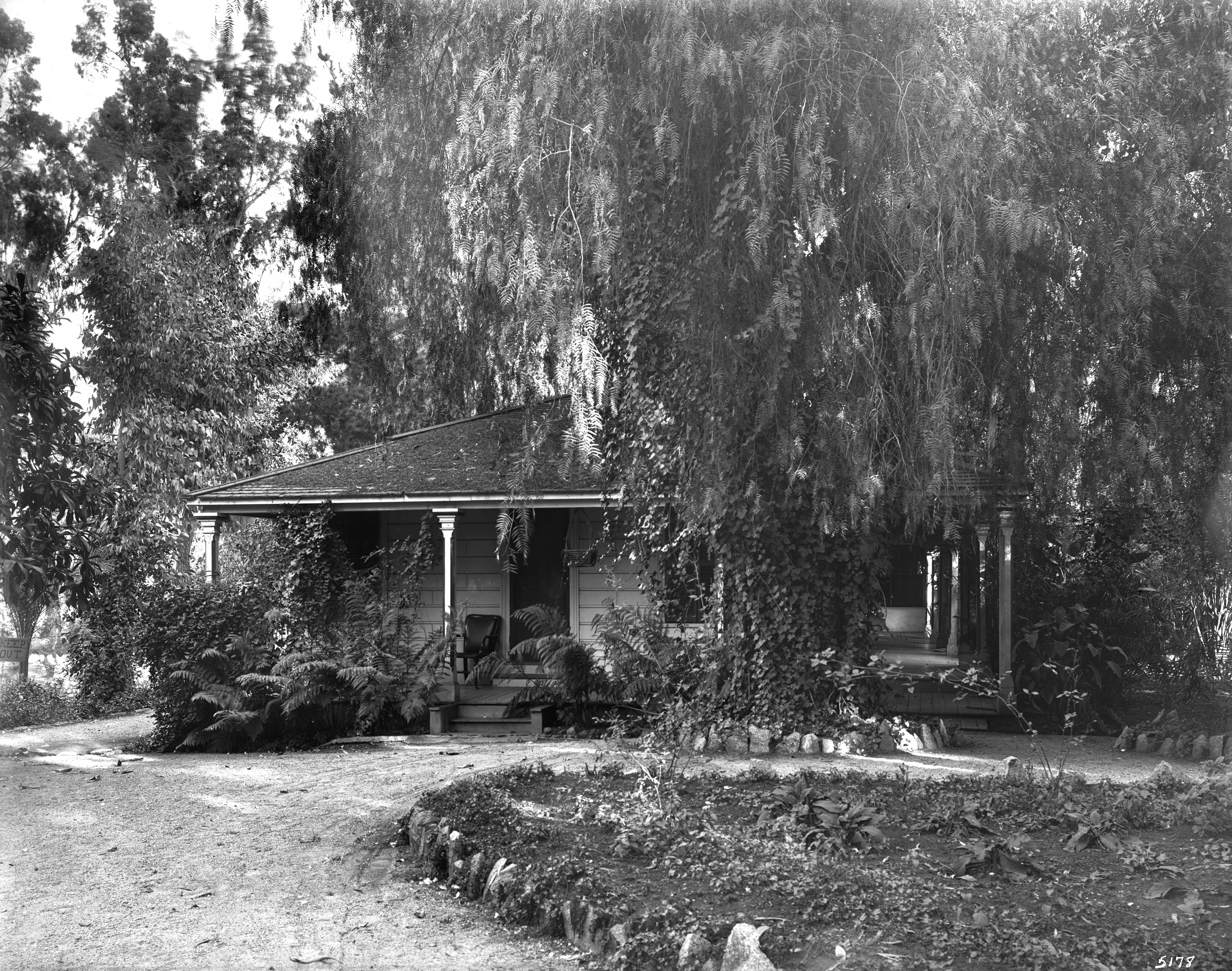
- The "Hugo Reid Adobe" c. 1903, prior to removal of a wood-frame addition by Baldwin

- Location within the Los Angeles metropolitan area
- Location: 301 N Baldwin Ave, Arcadia CA

History
- Built: 1839

California Historical Landmark
- Designated: April 3, 1940
- Reference no.: 368

The Reid-Baldwin Adobe, formerly called the Hugo Reid Adobe, is an adobe house built in 1839. It is located at the Los Angeles County Arboretum and Botanic Garden in Arcadia, California. The Hugo Reid Adobe was designated a California Historic Landmark (No. 368) on April 3, 1940. The Reid Adobe was built by Scottish−Mexican Hugo Reid on the shore of what is now called Baldwin Lake, with the help of local natives. Reid received the full Mexican land grant for Rancho Santa Anita in 1845, which included 13,319 acres of land. Reid farmed some of the land and planted grape vines.

Hugo Reid (1811–1852), born in Scotland, was an early resident of Los Angeles County who became a naturalized citizen of California (then a part of Mexico) in 1839. He married Bartolomea, a respected Gabrieleño woman, who became known as Victoria Reid. Born at the village of Comicranga and taken to San Gabriel Mission at the age of six, Bartolomea was married at the age of 13 to an older indigenous man, as arranged by the Franciscan fathers. The couple later were given small plots of land for their work at the mission.

When the mission was secularized, Bartolomea had been widowed and had remarried, to Hugo Reid. As he was not yet a naturalized citizen, she received a land grant in her name alone. Their marriage elevated Hugo's status, as she was a well-connected mission Indian.

Elias Jackson “Lucky” Baldwin purchased Rancho Santa Anita in 1875. In 1879 Baldwin added a wooden wing to the old adobe home. Elias Jackson "Lucky" Baldwin (1828–1909) was a pioneer of California business, an investor, and real estate speculator during the second half of the 19th century. He earned the nickname "Lucky" Baldwin due to his extraordinary good fortune in a number of business deals. He built the luxury Baldwin Hotel and Theatre in San Francisco and bought vast tracts of land in Southern California, where a number of places and neighborhoods are named after him.

In 1947 the state and county acquired the land to create an arboretum around the lake and historic Reid-Baldwin structures.

== Reconstruction ==
Without a good roof, adobe structures can be damaged quickly. Even with a good roof, adobe structures still need constant maintenance. The Rancho-Era California Adobe is under repair and reconstruction, with completion expected in 2023.

The original home was built with sun-dried adobe bricks, made with clay soil, water, and straw to add strength. The original adobe home's roof was made of rawhide animal skin used to tie giant cane reeds together. The roof was coated with tar to preserve it. The original reconstruction of the Hugo Reid Adobe tried to use much of the original methods and materials.

== Marker ==
Proposed State Marker for the site reads:

- NO. 368 REID-BALDWIN ADOBE – Reid, a Scotsman, petitioned the government of Mexico to grant him Rancho Santa Anita. His claim strengthened by his marriage to Victoria, a native Indian of the San Gabriel Mission, he received the grant on April 16, 1841. Immediately upon filing his petition, Reid took possession of the land, started to farm and plant vineyards, and built the first house – the Hugo Reid Adobe – in 1839. In 1875, E. J. Baldwin purchased the rancho and in 1879 added a wooden wing to the old adobe.

== See also ==
- Reid-Baldwin Adobe Historical Markers
- Santa Anita Train Depot
- Queen Anne Cottage and Coach Barn
- California Historical Landmarks in Los Angeles County
- List of California Ranchos
- Ranchos of Los Angeles County, California
