= Los Angeles County Arboretum and Botanic Garden =

Arboretum and botanical garden in Arcadia, California

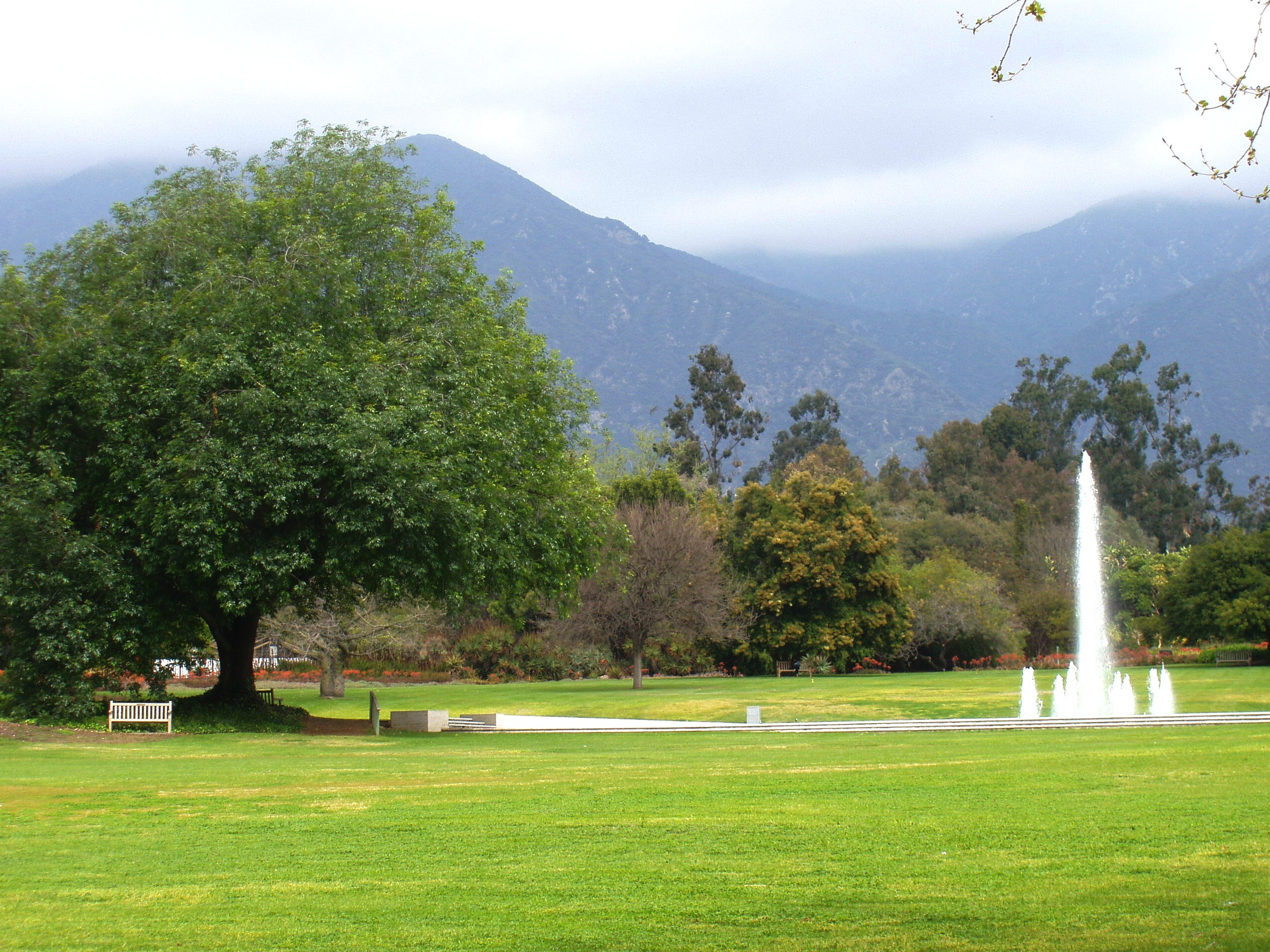
- Central fountain within the arboretum — with view of San Gabriel Mountains in the distance.
- Founded: 1947
- Founder: State of California and County of Los Angeles
- Type: Collections-based research and educational institution
- Purpose: Research, education
- Location: 301 North Baldwin Avenue, Arcadia, California
- Coordinates: 34.1415392°N 118.0540609°W
- Region served: Southern California
- Product: Botanical Gardens
- Owner: County of Los Angeles
- CEO: Su Oh
- Parent organization: Los Angeles County Parks and Recreation
- Website: arboretum.org

The Los Angeles County Arboretum and Botanic Garden, 127 acres (51.4 ha), is an arboretum, botanical garden, and historical site nestled into hills near the San Gabriel Mountains in Arcadia, California, United States. Open daily, it only closes on Christmas Day.

The Arboretum is located across the street from Santa Anita Park, the horse racetrack, and The Shops at Santa Anita.

== History ==
The Arboretum is sited on a remaining portion of the Rancho Santa Anita, one of the Mexican land grants of Southern California. Rancho Santa Anita was unusual in that it was located above a large part of the Raymond Basin aquifer. Three sag ponds and numerous springs were found in the area and the only remaining one is now called Baldwin Lake. Lacy Park in the city of San Marino once was another sag pond and the precise location of the third is not known but may have been on the grounds of the Huntington Library and Botanic Garden. As a consequence of the relative abundance of water, it was important area in prehistory as a year-round source of water, the body of water known as Baldwin Lake and the other sag ponds attracted both waterfowl and other animals as well as Native Americans. Not surprisingly the presence of water and game created a permanent Native American habitation in the area and is believed to have been the location of the Tongva village of Aleupkigna. The close proximity to the nearby San Gabriel Mission may have led to the construction of a small seasonal dwelling at the Arboretum site for shepherds or hunters which ultimately led to the construction of a modest adobe structure.

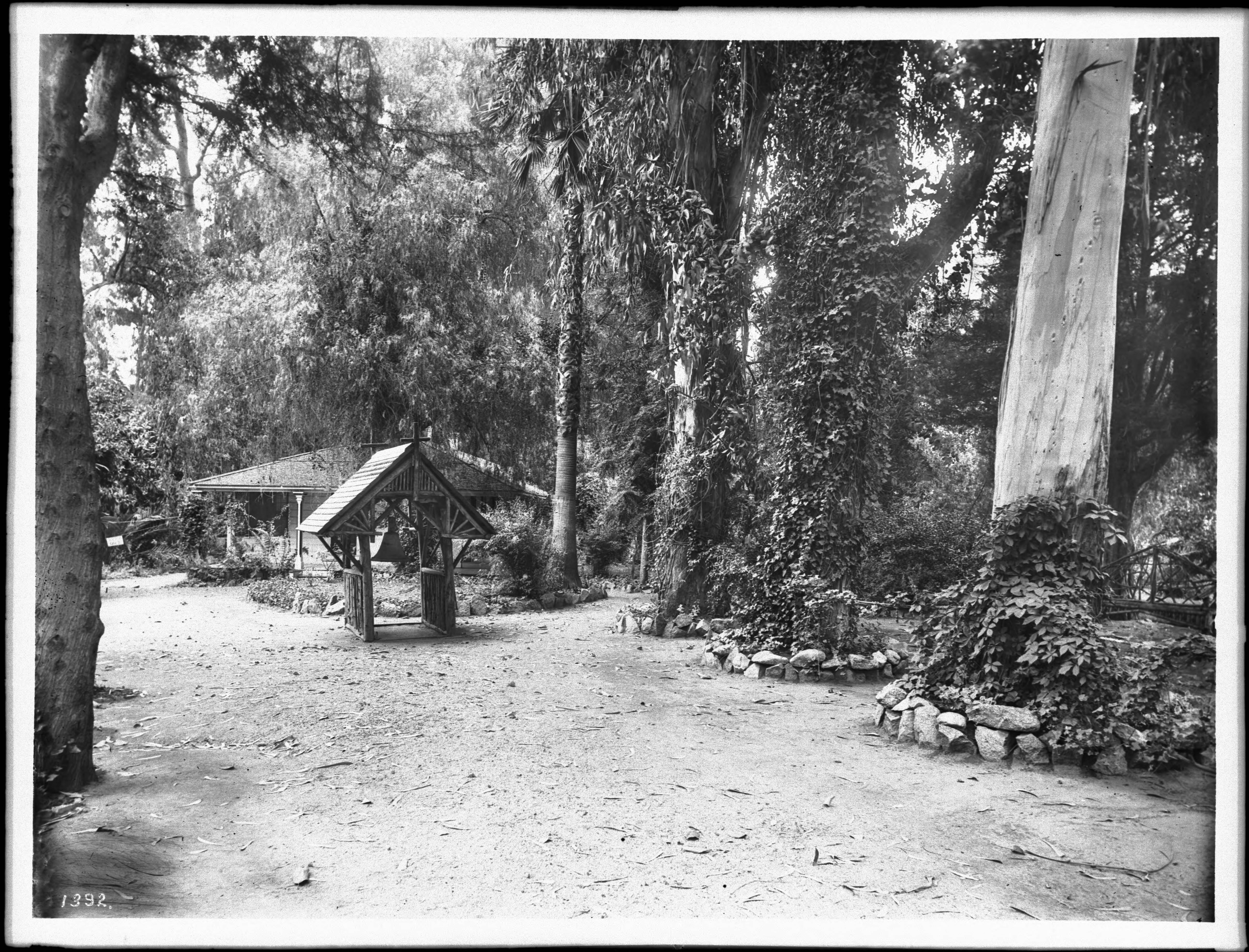
Hugo Reid adobe and old mission bell at Rancho Santa Anita.

In 1839, the grant to Rancho Santa Anita was awarded to Hugo Reid (1809–1852) and his Tongva wife, Victoria. Reid built an adobe home by the lake in 1839, now a California Historic Landmark. Reid was an educated Scotsman known for a series of letters describing Tongva culture. Otherwise Reid was probably best known for his role in the 1849 California Constitutional Convention. Afflicted with tuberculosis, he died at the age of 43. A series of short term owners of the property, Rancho Santa Anita, followed.

Subsequent owners of Rancho Santa Anita were; in sequence, Henry Dalton, Joseph A. Rowe, Albert Dibblee in partnership with William Corbett and a Mr. Barker, Leonard Rose and William Wolfskill, Alfred Chapman with Harris Newmark until finally the property was sold to Elias Jackson Baldwin. With each transition, beginning with the sale to Rose and Wolfskill, a portion of the ranch was sold off. Every owner in some ways typifies the history of southern California during the period. Agricultural innovation is a feature which persisted taking advantage of the climate and the new crops that it made possible as well as a growing body of consumers and new markets opened by transportation innovations.

In 1875 when Elias Jackson "Lucky" Baldwin purchased Rancho Santa Anita and constructed its buildings and grounds. Baldwin's influence had a flamboyance that was evident in the creation of a showcase at the Oakwood Hotel and the Santa Anita racetrack. Commercial viticulture flourished around the San Gabriel Mission since mission days. Baldwin started an award-winning winery to supply tourists, sold land to settlers as well as running a private water company and brick works. A partnership with Henry E. Huntington and the Santa Fe Railroad insured that passengers could arrive by rail from Los Angeles and other locations as well as bringing freight, such as building supplies and ship ranch produce.

The arboretum began in 1947 with California and Los Angeles jointly purchasing 111 acres (44.9 ha) to create an arboretum around the Baldwin site. By 1949, the first greenhouse had been constructed and the site's plants inventoried. In 1951, the first 1,000 trees were planted, and in 1956 the arboretum was opened to the public. Ongoing construction of gardens and greenhouses took place during the 1950s and 1960s, and in 1975–1976 the Tropical Greenhouse was opened and the Prehistoric and Jungle Garden completed. Construction and renovation of both greenhouses and gardens continues.

Groundwater recharge ponds and a pump station has been proposed by the Los Angeles County Department of Public Works and a consortium of five foothill cities for 4 acres (1.6 ha) of the Australia section.

== The gardens ==
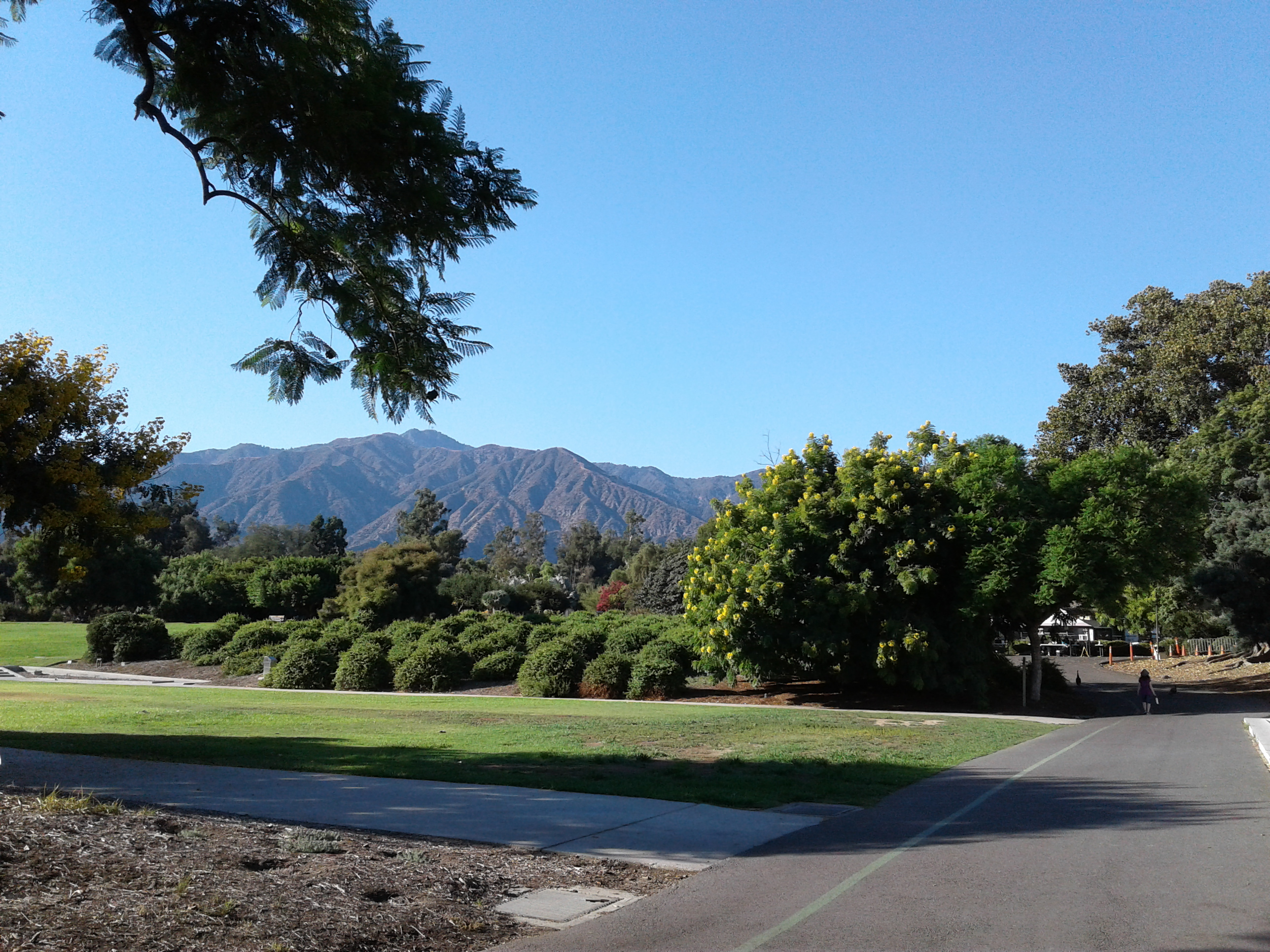
Mt Wilson seen from the main lawn near the entrance. Jacaranda mimosifolia, Golden Medallion (Cassia leptophylla), Afrocarpus falcatus, and Ficus macrocarpa (Moreton Bay Fig) trees nearby.

The arboretum's plants are grouped by geography with gardens for South American, Mediterranean, South African, Australian and Asiatic-North American plants. Other displays include the Aquatic Garden, Meadowbrook, Demonstration Home Gardens, Garden for All Seasons, Prehistoric and Jungle Garden, Native Oaks, Herb Garden, and the Palm and Bamboo collection. The gardens also serve as the home for summer concerts featuring the Pasadena POPS, under the direction of Principal POPS Conductor Michael Feinstein.

In addition, the gardens are home to a flock of peafowl which are the descendants of the first group of birds imported by Baldwin from India. The peafowl is a symbol of the city of Arcadia. The first record of peafowl in what is now the United States was the introduction by Frances Sinclair on Kaua’i I., Hawai‘i, in 1860. However the first reported introduction into the continental United States occurred in 1879, when Elias J. "Lucky" Baldwin brought 3 pairs to his vast ranch in the San Gabriel Valley of California. Today, semidomestic or feral populations persist mostly in California and Florida. Peafowl can also be found throughout neighborhoods surrounding the arboretum.

== Baldwin Lake ==
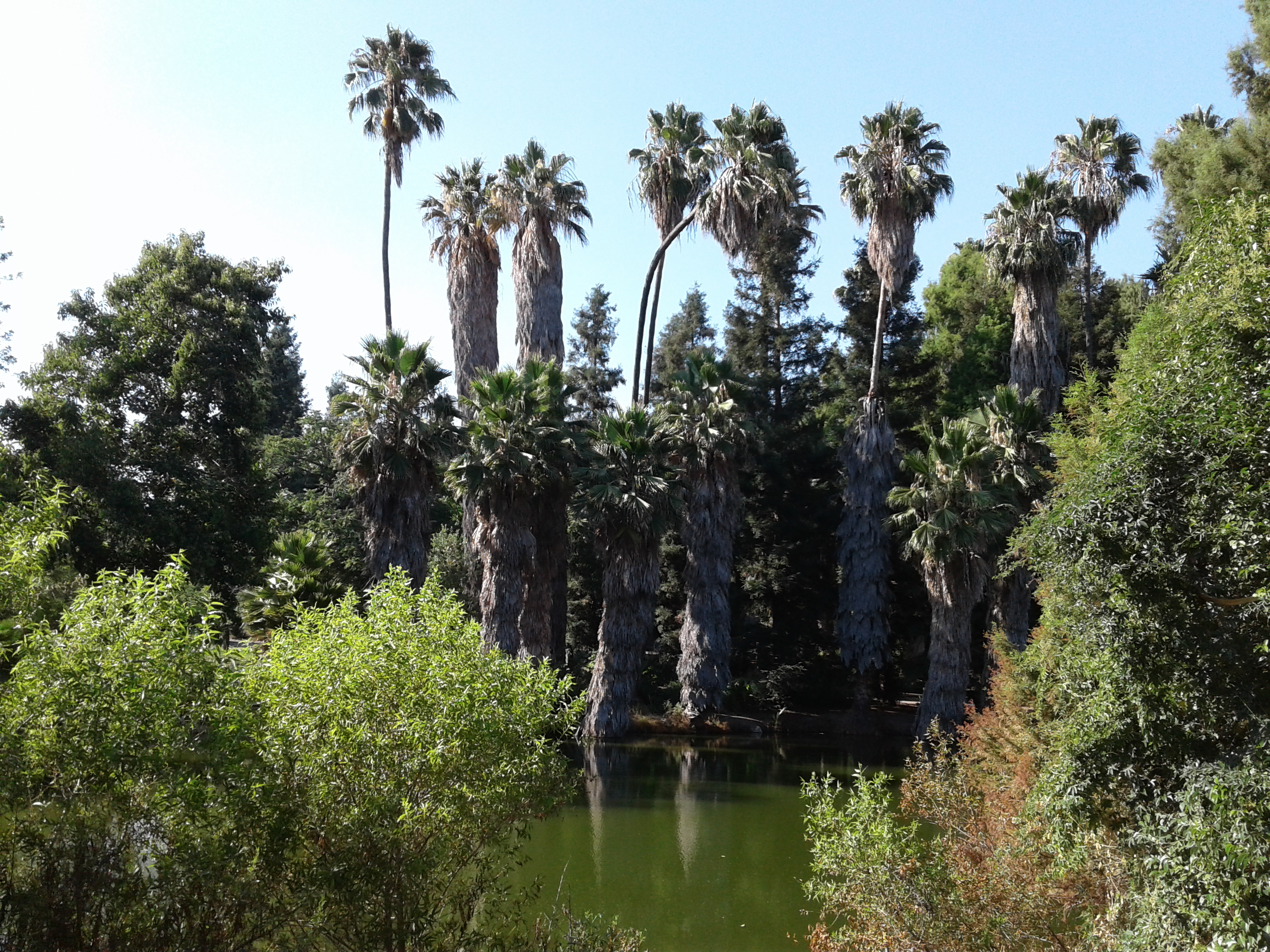
Looking north across Baldwin Lake. North shore lined with the native California fan palm (Washingtonia filifera) and Mexican fan palm (Washingtonia filifera var. robusta)..

Baldwin Lake surrounding the Queen Anne Cottage is a major attraction at the Arboretum. Numerous waterfowl including ducks and Canada geese are found there on a regular basis.

== Santa Anita Depot ==
In 1970, the Santa Fe Railway depot was moved to the Arboretum during the construction of the 210 Foothill Freeway. It was built in 1890 at today's Colorado Boulevard and Old Ranch Rd. to serve Lucky Baldwin, and the people of Rancho Santa Anita. The depot opened on the Southern California Railway in 1890 and was sold to Santa Fe on January 17, 1906. Before the depot was built, the site was a Rancho Santa Anita railway siding on the Los Angeles and San Gabriel Valley Railroad opened in 1887. The depot is furnished with railroad memorabilia and is open to visitors.

== Management ==
Los Angeles County Arboretum and Botanic Garden is governed by Los Angeles Arboretum Foundation and Los Angeles County Department of Parks and Recreation.

The Los Angeles Arboretum Foundation is a non-profit organization governed by a board of trustees with a CEO. The current CEO and President of the board of trustees are:

- CEO: Su Oh
- President: Annette Castro Ramirez.

The current Los Angeles County Department of Parks and Recreation leaders at the Arboretum are:

- Director: Norma E. García-González
- Deputy Director: Kevin Regan
- Regional Operations Manager: Hugo Maldonado

== Gallery ==
Selected garden images of Los Angeles County Arboretum and Botanic Garden.

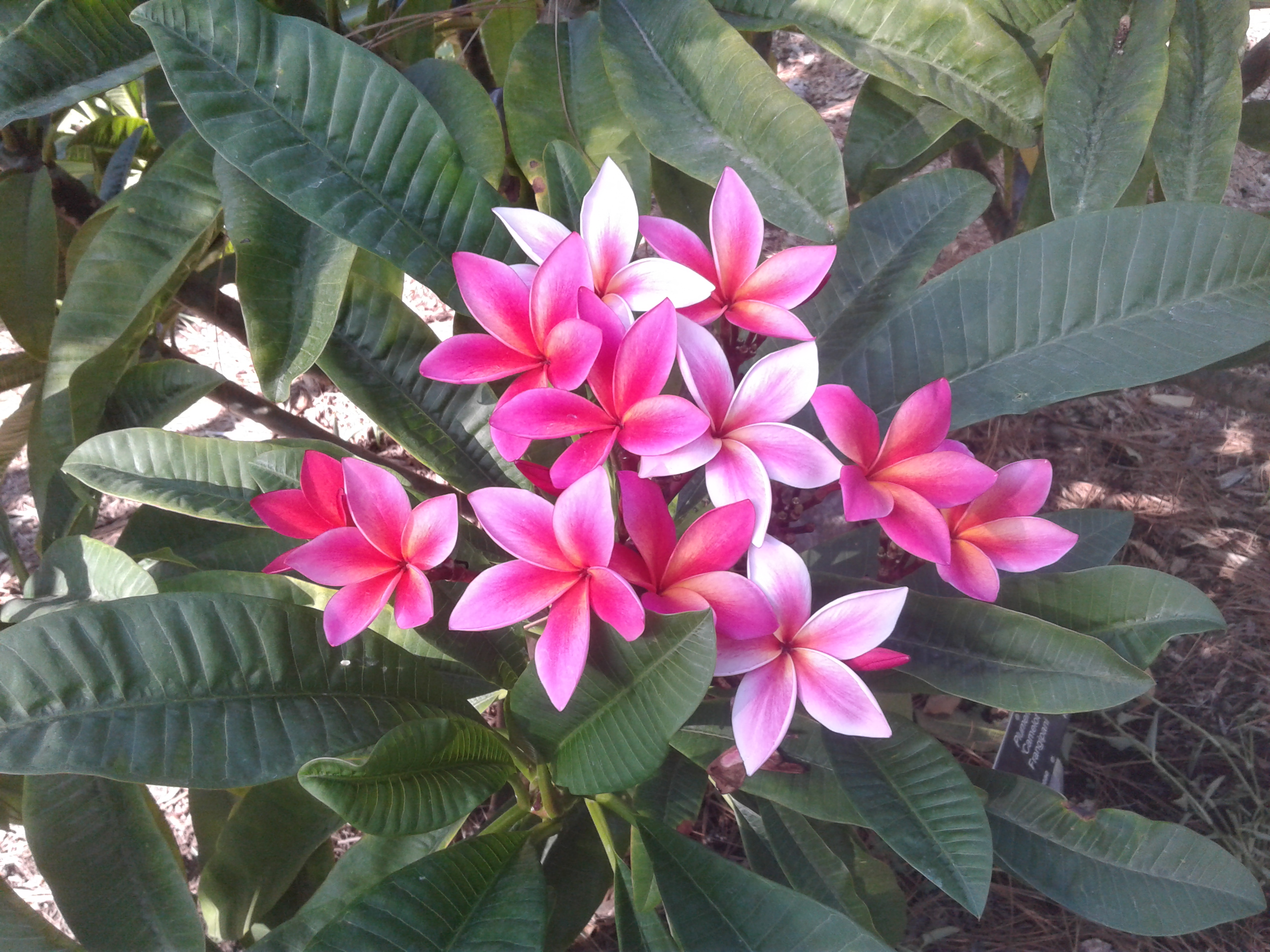
Plumeria blossoms on Tallac knoll

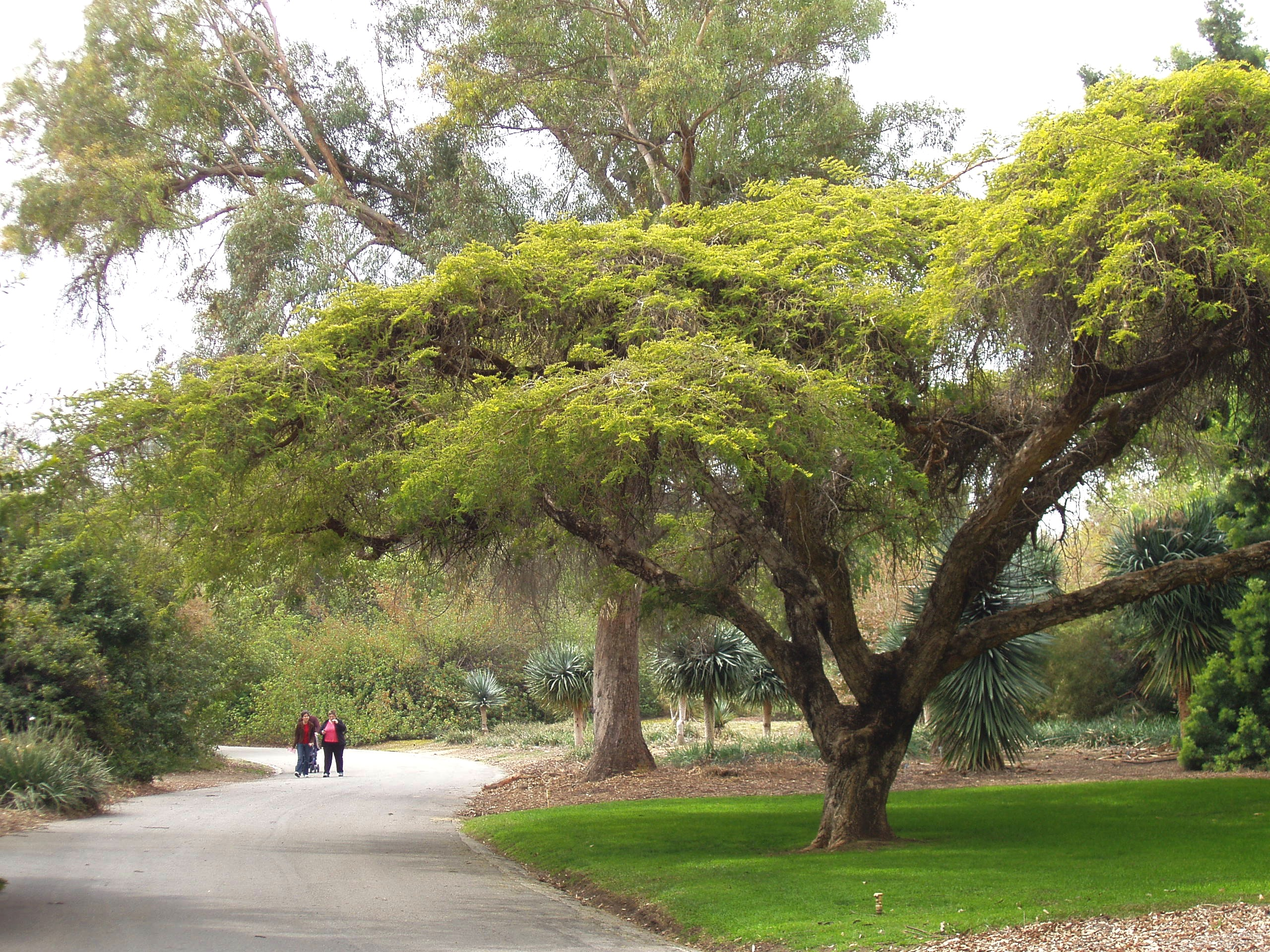
Near the Australian collection

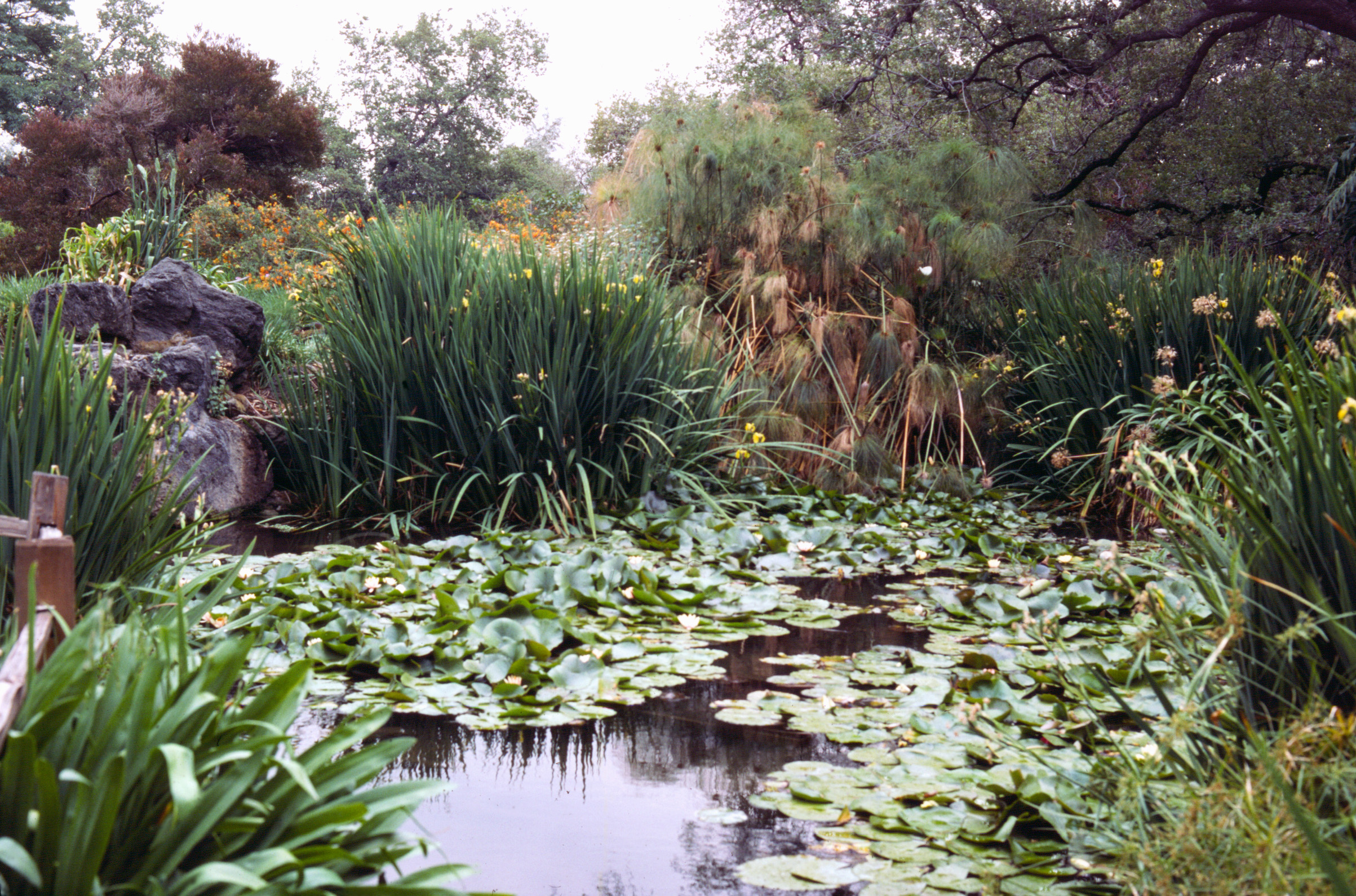
Pond view

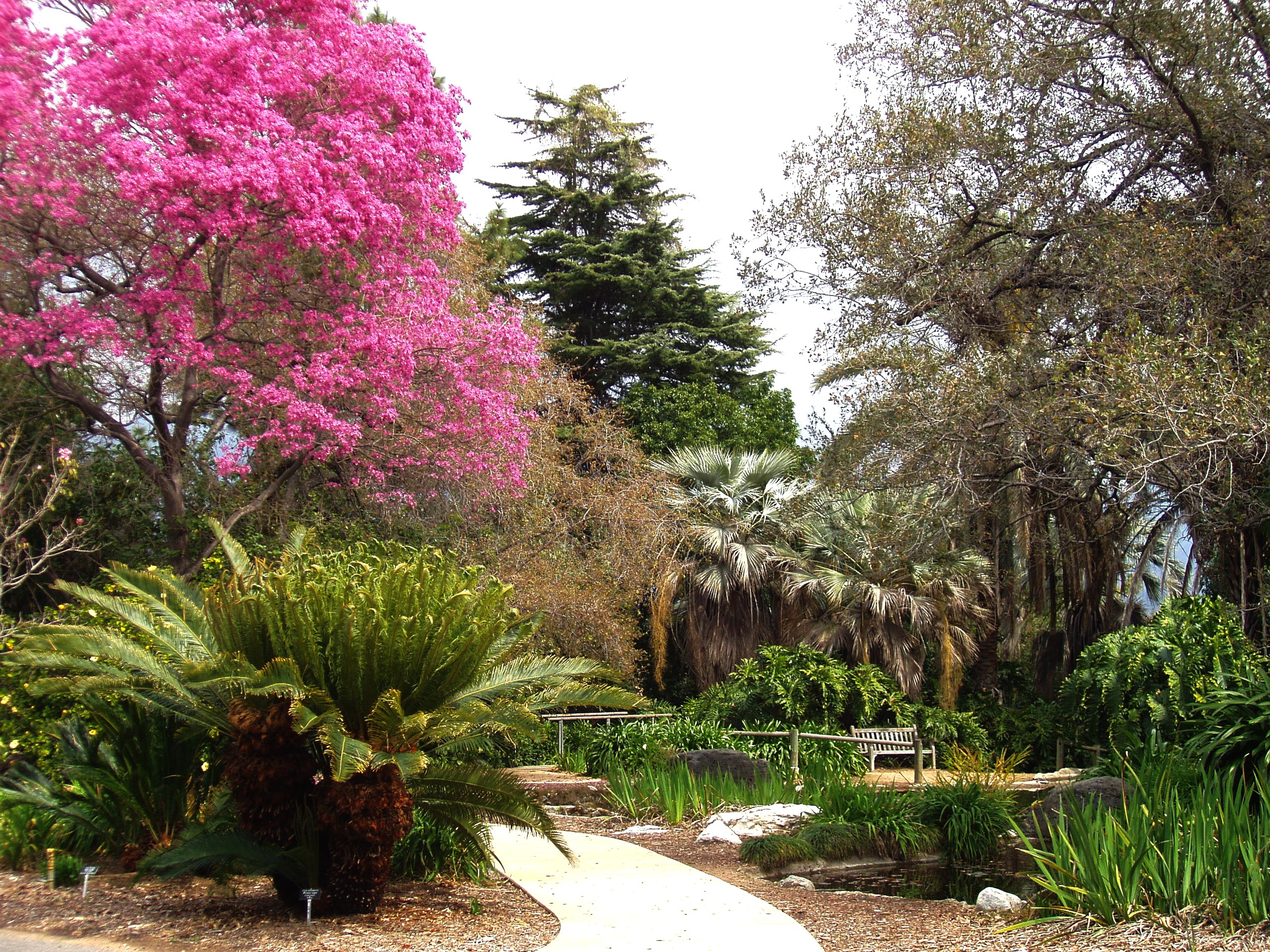
Atop the knoll

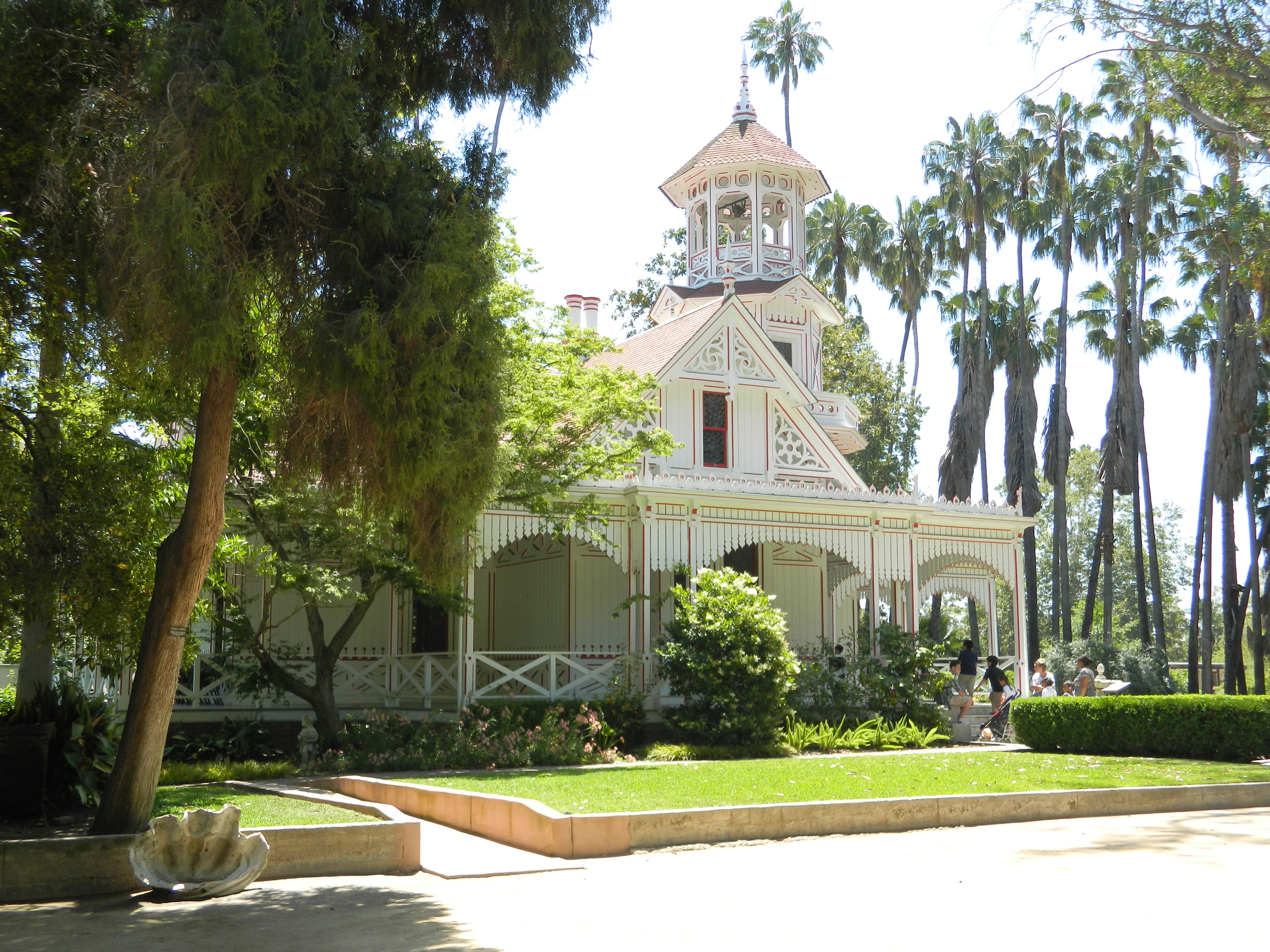
Queen Anne Cottage and Coach Barn

== In popular culture ==
Dozens of movies and televisions programs have had scenes filmed at the arboretum beginning in 1936, including portions of two Jurassic Park movies and Objective, Burma!.

Some of the Tarzan adventure movies were partially shot here. It was also the scenes for Paradise Island on The New Original Wonder Woman.

The Queen Anne Cottage used in the opening credits of the television series Fantasy Island is located here. The Queen Anne Cottage is reported to be haunted. Some have claimed to see the ghost of Lucky Baldwin or one of his wives. Visitors have claimed hearing moaning coming from the house (where Lucky Baldwin's wife also died of cancer), odd cooking smells, and seeing various strange anomalies walk the gardens at night.

A number of films have been made at the Santa Anita Depot, including the remake of Christmas in Connecticut, which starred Dyan Cannon, Arnold Schwarzenegger (also directed), and Kris Kristofferson.

In 2013, Katy Perry filmed her music video for "Roar" at the arboretum.

Other movies filmed here include:

- Tarzan Escapes (1936)
- Tarzan and the Amazons (1945)
- Tarzan's Peril (1951)
- Tarzan and the Leopard Woman (1946)
- Tarzan and the Huntress (1947)
- Tarzan and the Slave Girl (1950)
- Tarzan's Hidden Jungle (1955)
- Captive Girl (1950)
- Pygmy Island (1950)
- Jungle Manhunt (1951)
- Mark of the Gorilla (1950)
- Jungle Jim (1948)
- Devil’s Island (1938)
- The Man in the Iron Mask (1939)
- The Women (1939)
- Road to Singapore (1940)
- The Lady Eve (1941)
- Anna and the King of Siam (1946)
- The Best Years of Our Lives (1946)
- Notorious (1946)
- Till the Clouds Roll By (1946)
- Typhoon (1940)
- The African Queen (1951)
- Attack of the Giant Leeches (1959)
- Behind Enemy Lines (1986)
- Who’s That Girl (1987)
- Lord of the Flies (1990)
- Terminator 2: Judgment Day (1991)
- Dave (1993)
- The American President (1995)
- Matilda (1996)
- Anaconda (1997)
- Bedazzled (2000)
- Saving Mr. Banks (2013)
- Bridesmaids (2011)
- Meet The Fockers (2004)

== See also ==
- Botanical gardens in California
- List of botanical gardens in the United States
- Parks in Los Angeles County, California
- Hugo Reid Adobe
