= Hugo Reid =

Scotland-born early resident of Los Angeles County and author (1811–1852)

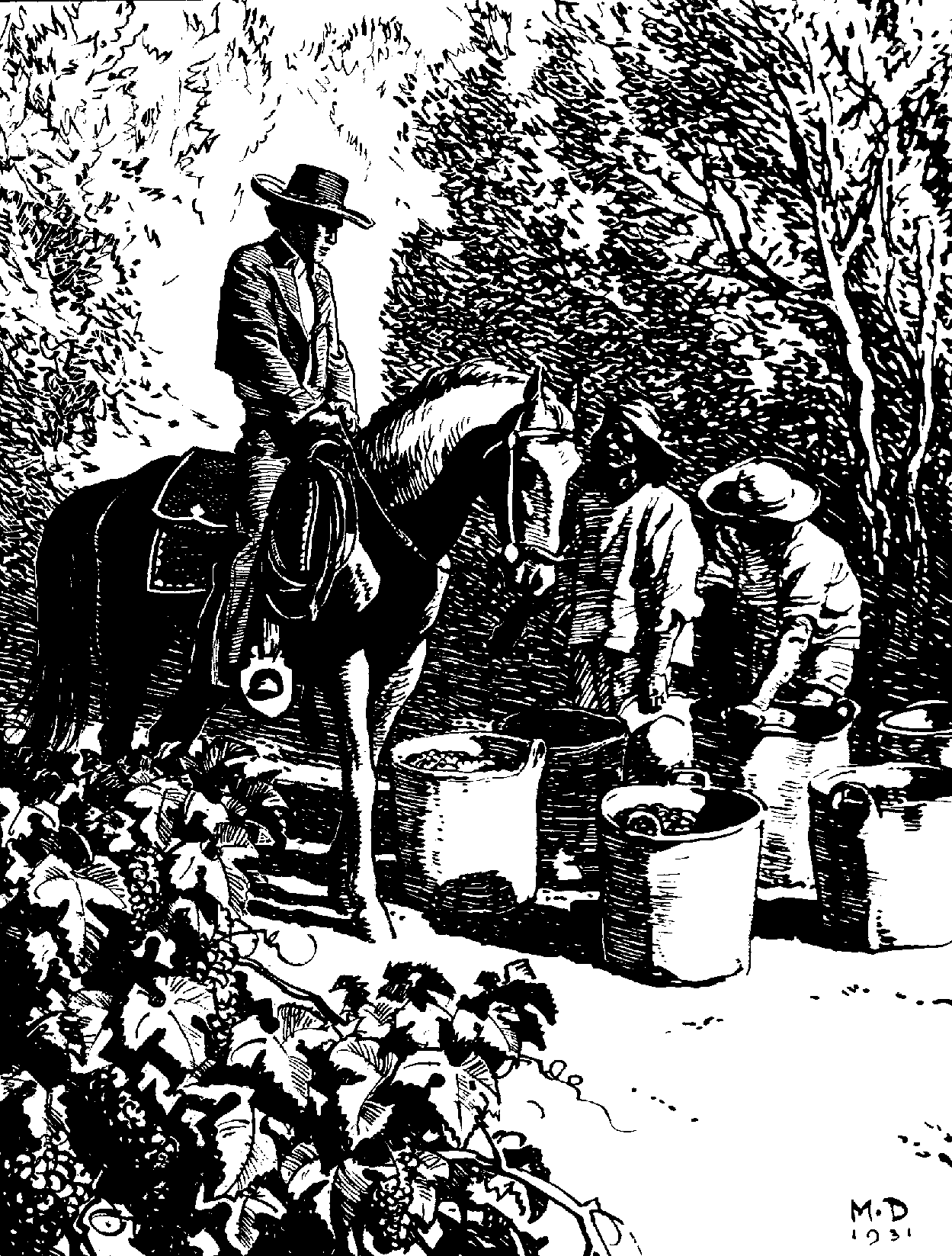
Artist's conception of Reid at Rancho Santa Anita

Hugo Reid (April 18, 1811 – December 12, 1852) was a Scottish immigrant and early resident of Los Angeles County who became known for writing a series of newspaper articles, or "letters," that described the culture, language, and contemporary circumstances of the local Tongva (Gabrieleño) people. He criticized the Franciscan missionaries, who administered the Spanish missions in California, for their treatment of the native peoples.

Born and raised in Scotland, Reid immigrated to California as a young man after setting up trading in Mexico. He became a naturalized citizen there when the province was a part of the Republic of Mexico, and married Victoria Reid, who was born at the village of Comicranga and a respected land-owning woman in Alta California.

== Life ==
He was born to Charles Reid and Essex Milliken, at Cardross, Dunbartonshire, Scotland, on 18 April 1811. As a young man, Reid established a trading house in Hermosillo, Mexico in the late 1820s with a business partner, William Keith. He first visited Los Angeles, then a part of Mexican Alta California, in 1832.

After settling there, he converted to Roman Catholicism and married Victoria Bartolomea Comicrabita, a Gabrieleño woman from the village of Comicranga, who became a convert at Mission San Gabriel. He adopted her children, Felipe, Jose Delores and María Ygnacia.

After Mexico attained independence, it secularized some mission holdings. Reid and his wife were granted the 13,319-acre (53.90 km^{2}) Rancho Santa Anita following secularization of Mission San Gabriel ranch lands. He built an adobe house there in 1839. The grant was confirmed by Alta California Governor Pio Pico in 1845. Reid was nicknamed the Scotch Paisano during his days as a Scottish settler in Mexican Southern California.

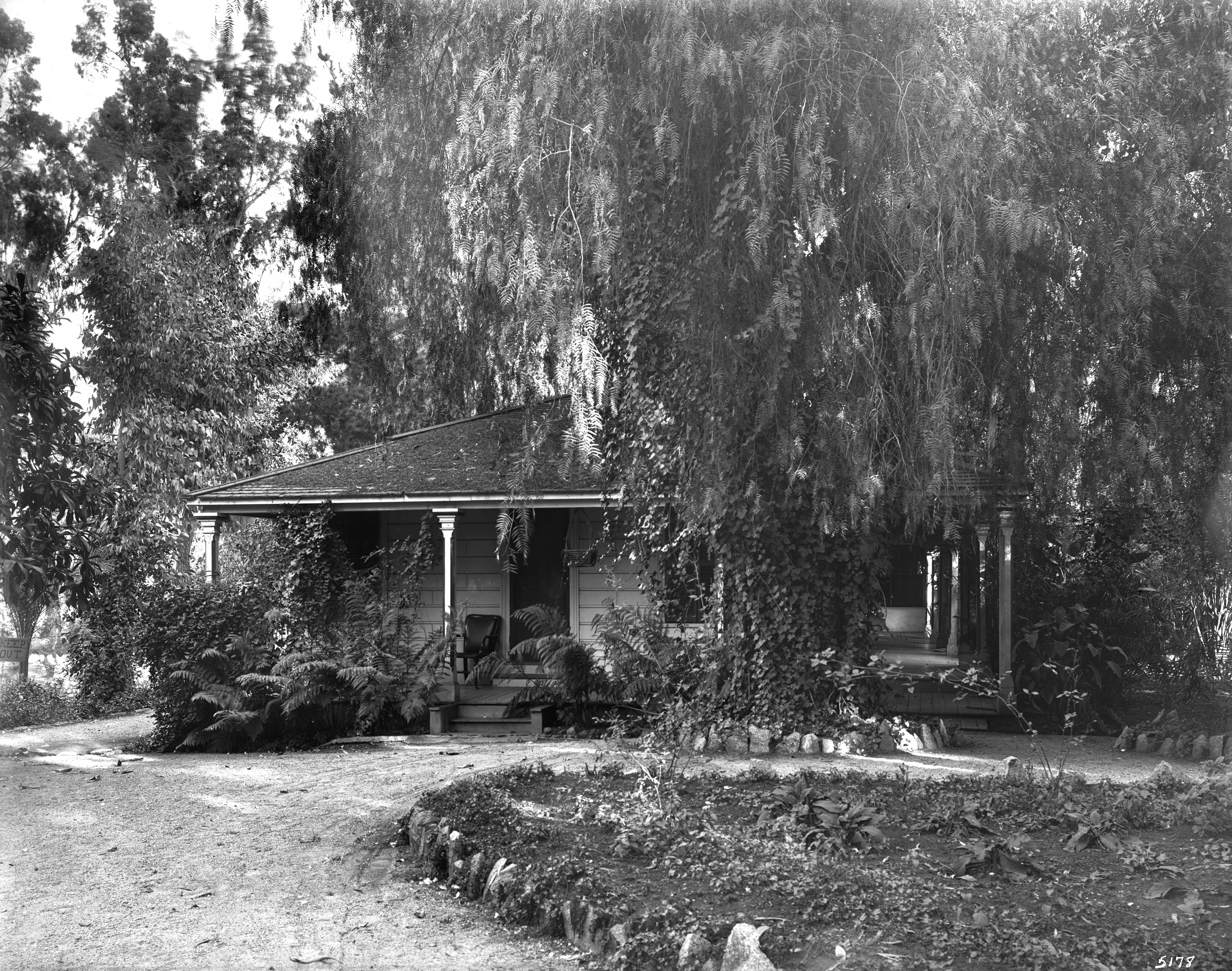
The "Hugo Reid Adobe" c. 1903, prior to removal of a wood-frame addition by Lucky Baldwin that was built

A restored adobe, which became known as the "Hugo Reid Adobe", was built on a different nearby site by a later owner. Today both Reid's original site and the surviving adobe are located at the Los Angeles County Arboretum and Botanic Garden, part of the former estate of Lucky Baldwin. This is within what is now the city of Arcadia.

== Letters about the Gabrieleño and two missions ==
Following the Mexican American War, the United States annexed California in 1848. While it promised to honor current deeds, Reid's fortunes suffered. In 1852 Reid wrote a series of 22 letters which were published in the Los Angeles Star. These provide an important ethnographic picture of the little–known Gabrieleño people. He also discussed the history of the San Gabriel and San Fernando missions, perhaps with an eye to being appointed as a US Indian agent.

The articles were collected and republished in book form several times. Arthur M. Ellis published the first collected book in 1926, entitled Hugo Reid's Account of the Indians of Los Angeles County, in an edition of 200 copies. In 1939, Susanna Bryant Dakin reprinted the collected letters in a new edition.

== Death and legacy ==
Reid died in Los Angeles on December 12, 1852, at age 41. His funeral was held at the old Our Lady Queen of Angels Church, located on Main Street in Los Angeles. He was buried in its adjacent cemetery.

His body was later moved to the Campo Santo (cemetery) on North Broadway (now the site of Cathedral High School). His remains were later disinterred and moved to the new Calvary Cemetery in East Los Angeles.

== See also ==
- Mission San Gabriel Arcángel
- Los Angeles County Arboretum and Botanic Garden

== Sources ==
- Dakin, Susanna Bryant. 1939. A Scotch Paisano: Hugo Reid's Life in California, 1832–1852, Derived from His Correspondence. University of California Press, Berkeley.
- Ellis, Arthur M. 1926. Hugo Reid's Account of the Indians of Los Angeles County. Privately Printed, Los Angeles.
- Reid, Hugo. 1968. The Indians of Los Angeles County: Hugo Reid's Letters of 1852. Edited and annotated by Robert F. Heizer. Southwest Museum Papers No. 21. Los Angeles.
