= Rancho Santa Anita =

Mexican land grant in California

Coordinates: 34.120°N 118.030°W

- Land grant of Mexico
- 1845–1875
  - Type: Mexican land grant
- History
  - Established: 1845
  - Disestablished: 1875
- Today part of: United States

Rancho Santa Anita was a 13,319-acre (53.90 km^{2}) land grant in present-day Los Angeles County, California, given to naturalized Scottish immigrant Hugo Reid and his Kizh people wife. Reid built an adobe residence there in 1839, and the land grant was formally recognized by Governor Pio Pico in 1845. The land grant covered all or portions of the present day cities of Arcadia, Monrovia, Sierra Madre, Pasadena and San Marino. A small portion of the rancho has been preserved as the Los Angeles County Arboretum and Botanic Garden.

== History ==
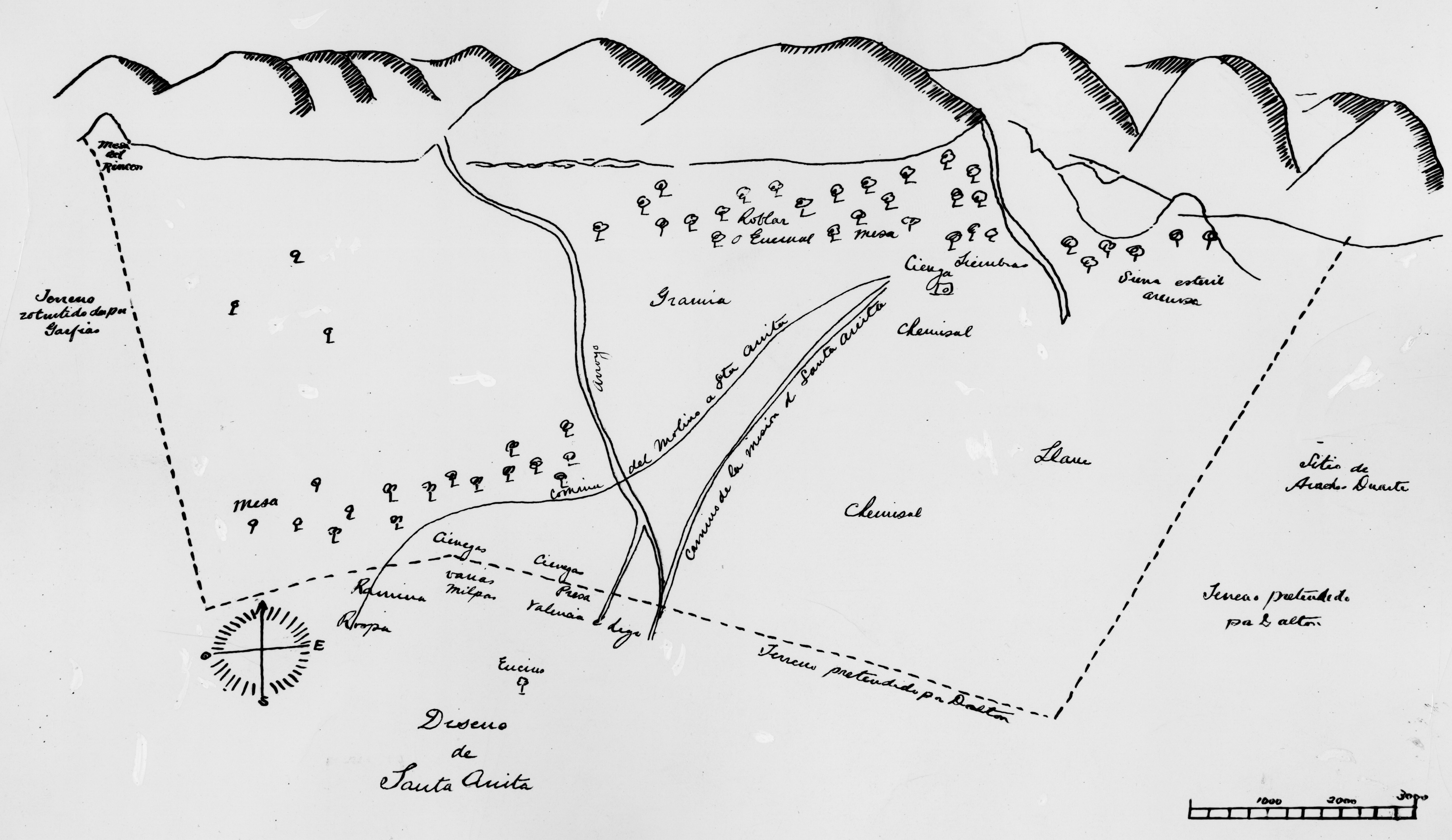
Map of Rancho Santa Anita circa 1800

The land granted to Reid was previously owned by the Mission San Gabriel. The San Gabriel Mission was founded in 1771 as the 4th of the Spanish missions in California. The San Gabriel Mission planted acres of land, in with: wheat, barley, corn, beans, peas lentils, fruit trees and vineyards. The land also grazed about 20,000 head of cattle. After the Mexican War of Independence in 1821, the Mexican secularization act of 1833 was passed. Starting in 1834 Mexico took away much of the Catholic Church's Mission land and sold it as Ranchos.

Reid was a Scot who became a Mexican citizen, thus being eligible to own Mexican land. To comply with Mexican law for the land grant of 13,319 acres, he built an adobe house and lived here with his wife, Victoria. In 1847, Reid sold Rancho Santa Anita to his Rancho Azusa neighbor, Henry Dalton for $2,700.

With the cession of California to the United States following the Mexican–American War, the 1848 Treaty of Guadalupe Hidalgo provided that the land grants would be honored. As required by the Land Act of 1851, a claim was filed with the Public Land Commission in 1852, and the grant was patented to Henry Dalton in 1866 (patent No. 454).

Joseph Andrew Rowe lived in the rancho for several years after purchasing it in 1854 for $33,000. In 1858, Albert Dibblee (1816–1895) and William Corbett bought the rancho and who held it until 1864. Then 1865, 11,319 acres of Rancho Santa Anita, sold or $20,000 to William Wolfskills. William's son, Luis Wolfskill, sold 8,500 acres with the lake to Los Angeles merchant Harris Newmark for $85,000.

In 1869, Alfred Beck Chapman (born 1829, died 1915) bought 1,786 acres of Rancho Santa Anita, and built a home near modern California Boulevard and Ivydale Court, Chapman Woods. Chapman Woods Road is in Pasadena. Citrus, walnuts, avocados, and pecans still live where he planted them. Chapman also grew peas, lentils, and wheat. Chapman Avenue, and Chapman University were named after the West Point graduate who owned part of the Silverado Mine in Orange County. In the 1920s, Jim Stewart and Ben Quigley subdivided Chapman Woods.

In 1875, Newmark sold Rancho Santa Anita to Elias Jackson ("Lucky") Baldwin for $200,000. Lucky moved into the Hugo Reid's adobe house by the natural lake. In 1881 he built a white Queen Anne style house at the lake also a Queen Anne style coach barn for his prized horse. Lucky loved horses, he initially founded a racetrack on Rancho Santa Anita in 1904. The racetrack closed in 1909 and burned down in 1912. In 1934, the current Santa Anita Park opened as a thoroughbred horse-racing track. In the latter 1880s, Baldwin subdivided a portion of the rancho to establish the town of Arcadia. In February 1881, Nathaniel Carter (Jan. 24, 1840 – Sept. 2, 1904) purchased 845 acres of Rancho Santa Anita, along with two other purchases, to form the new town of Sierra Madre, California.

In 1875, Lucky's Los Angeles Investment Company began subdividing and selling parcels from many of his ranchos. In 1883, 240 acres (970,000 m^{2}) of Rancho Santa Anita were sold to William Monroe for $30,000. Additional parcels of Rancho Santa Anita were sold to Edward F. Spence, John D. Bicknell, James F. Crank, and J.F. Falvey.

== Historic sites of the Rancho ==
- Hugo Reid Adobe. Rancho Santa Anita adobe house built by Reid in 1839.
- Santa Anita Depot, built in 1890 for the Santa Fe Railway.

== Gallery ==
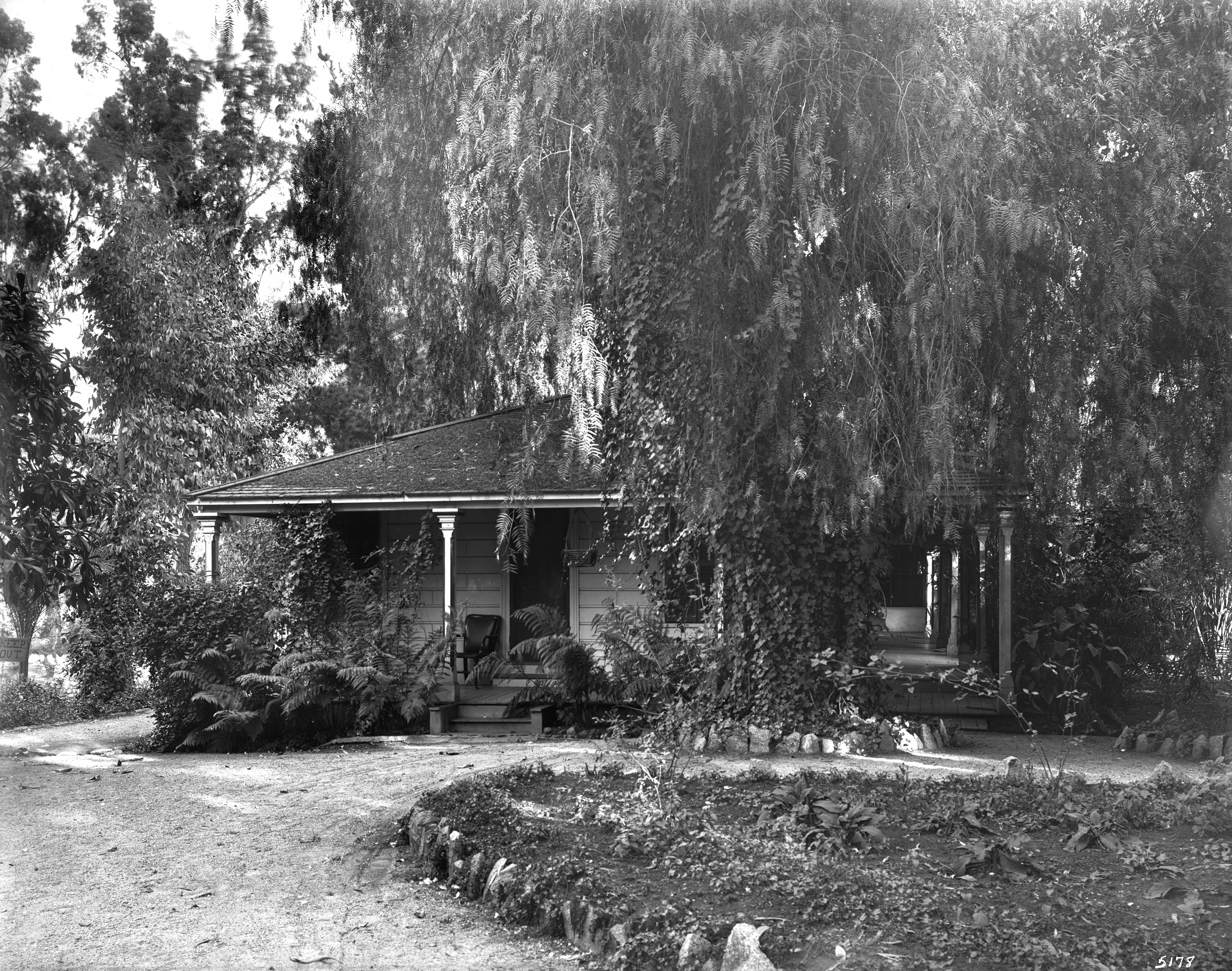
The home of Elias J. ("Lucky") Baldwin, the former Hugo Reid Adobe, at Rancho Santa Anita, ca.1903

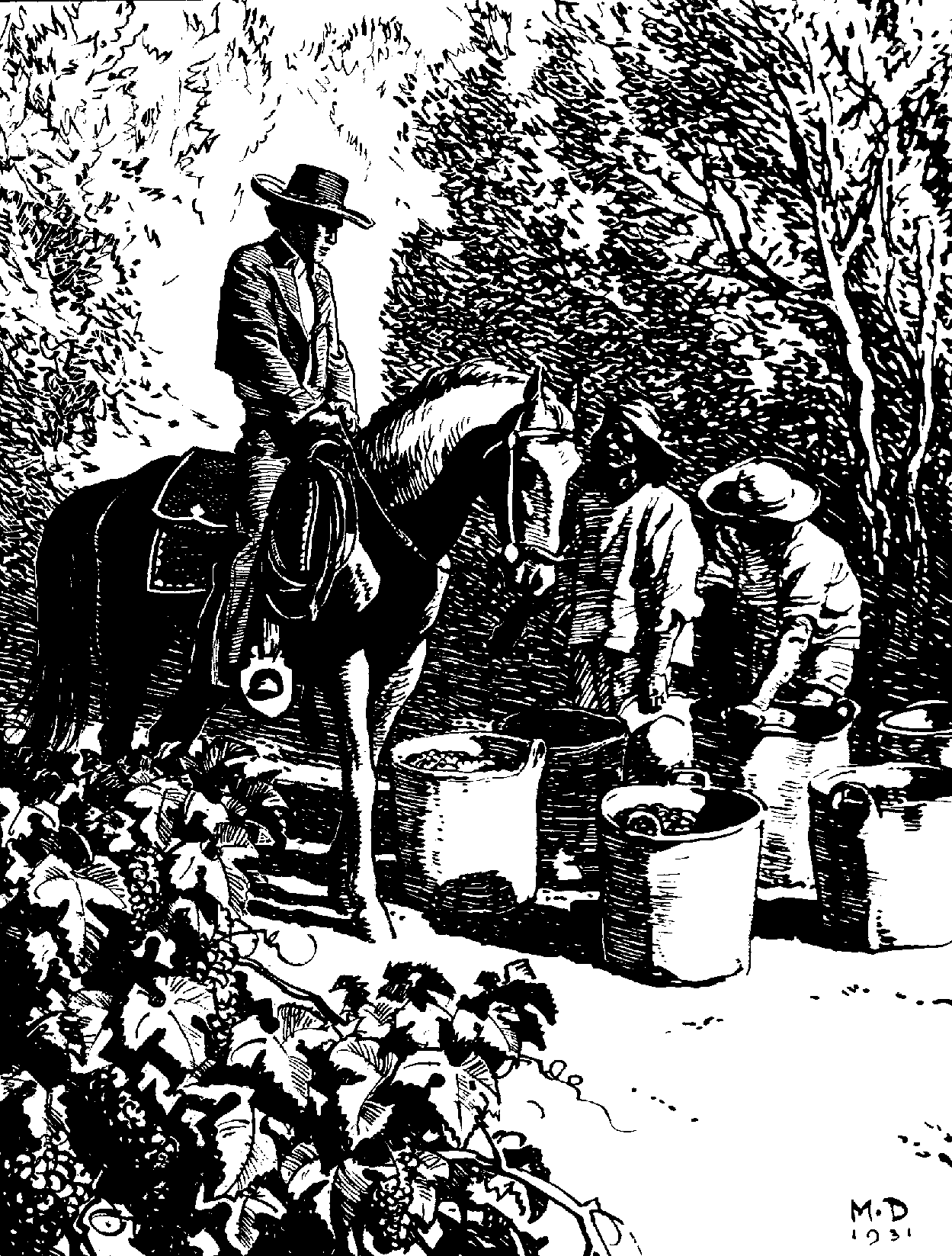
Hugo Reid at Rancho Santa Anita.

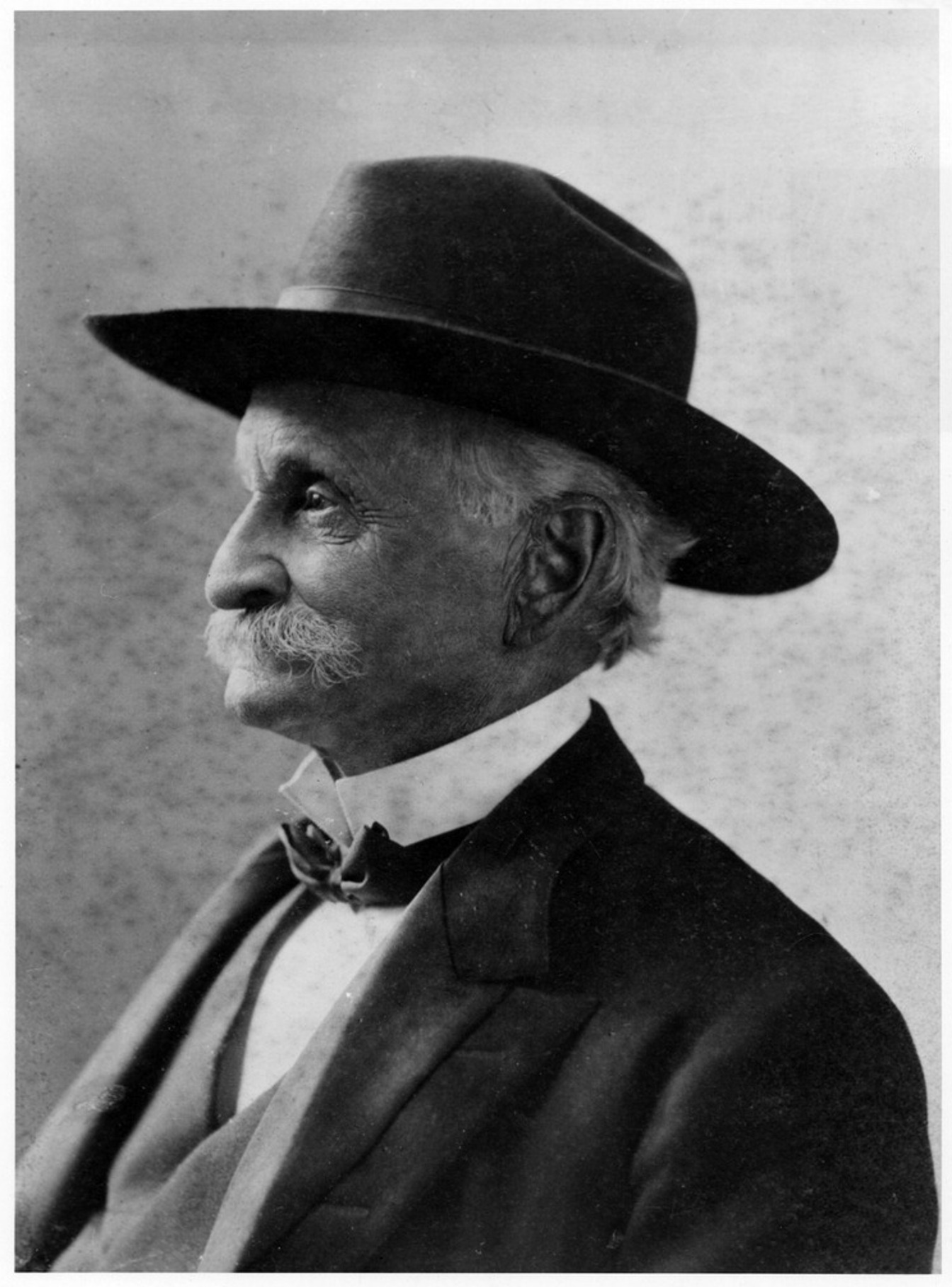
Lucky Baldwin in 1905

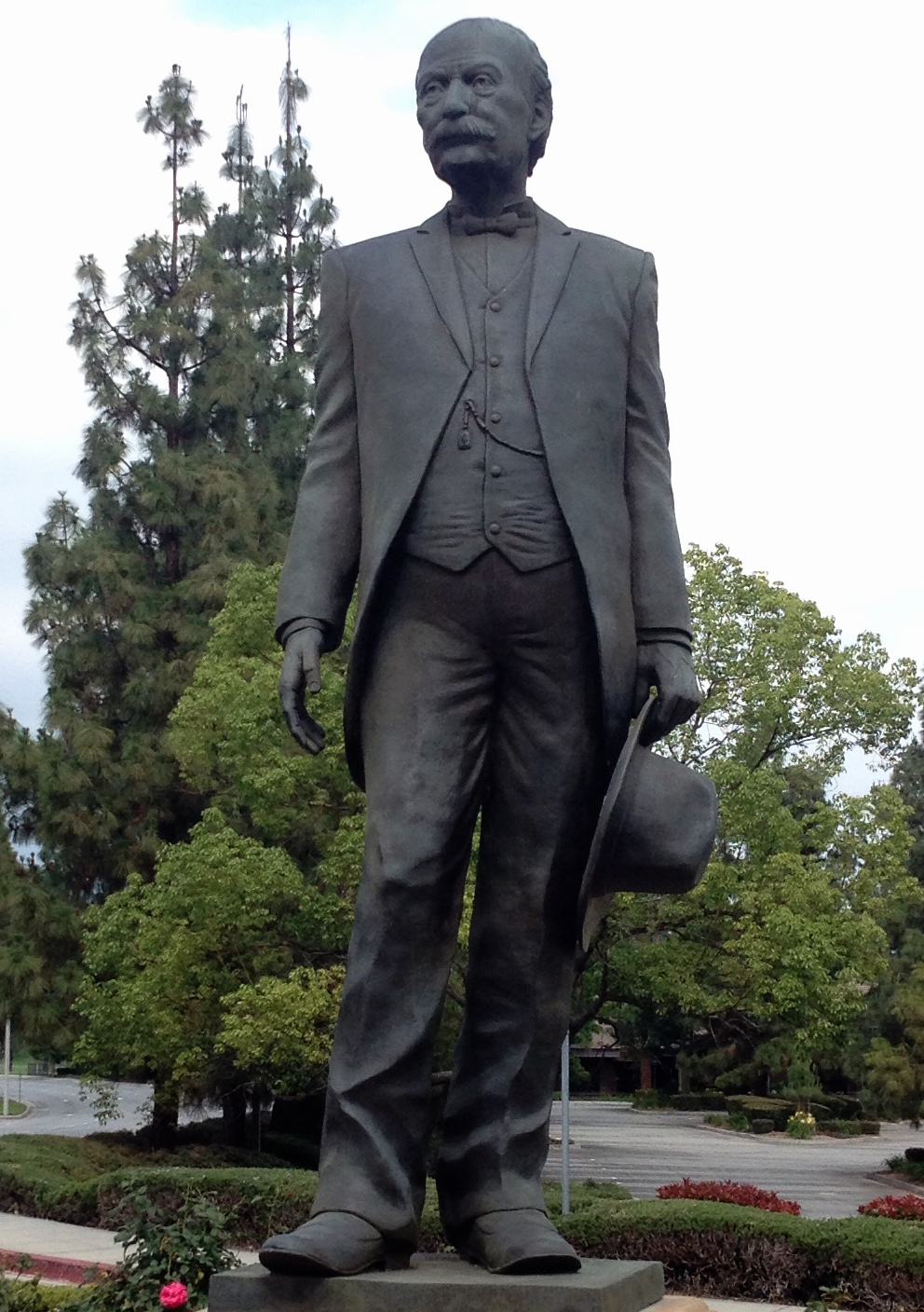
Lucky Baldwin statue, Arcadia, California – across Huntington Avenue from Santa Anita Racetrack at Holly Avenue

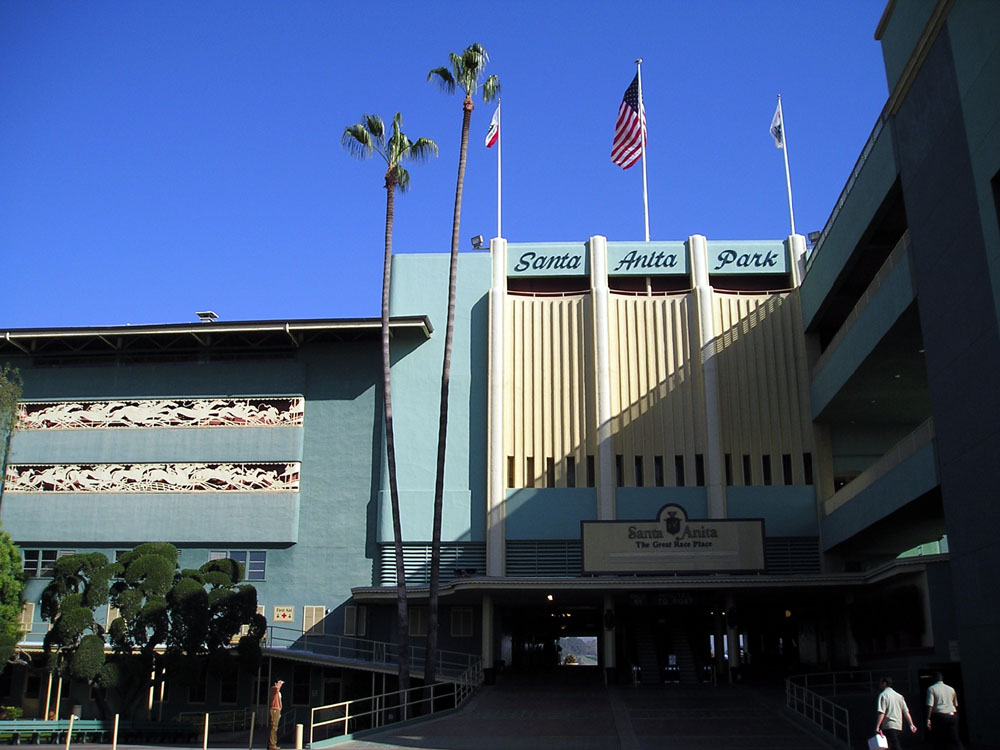
Art deco entrance to Santa Anita's grandstands

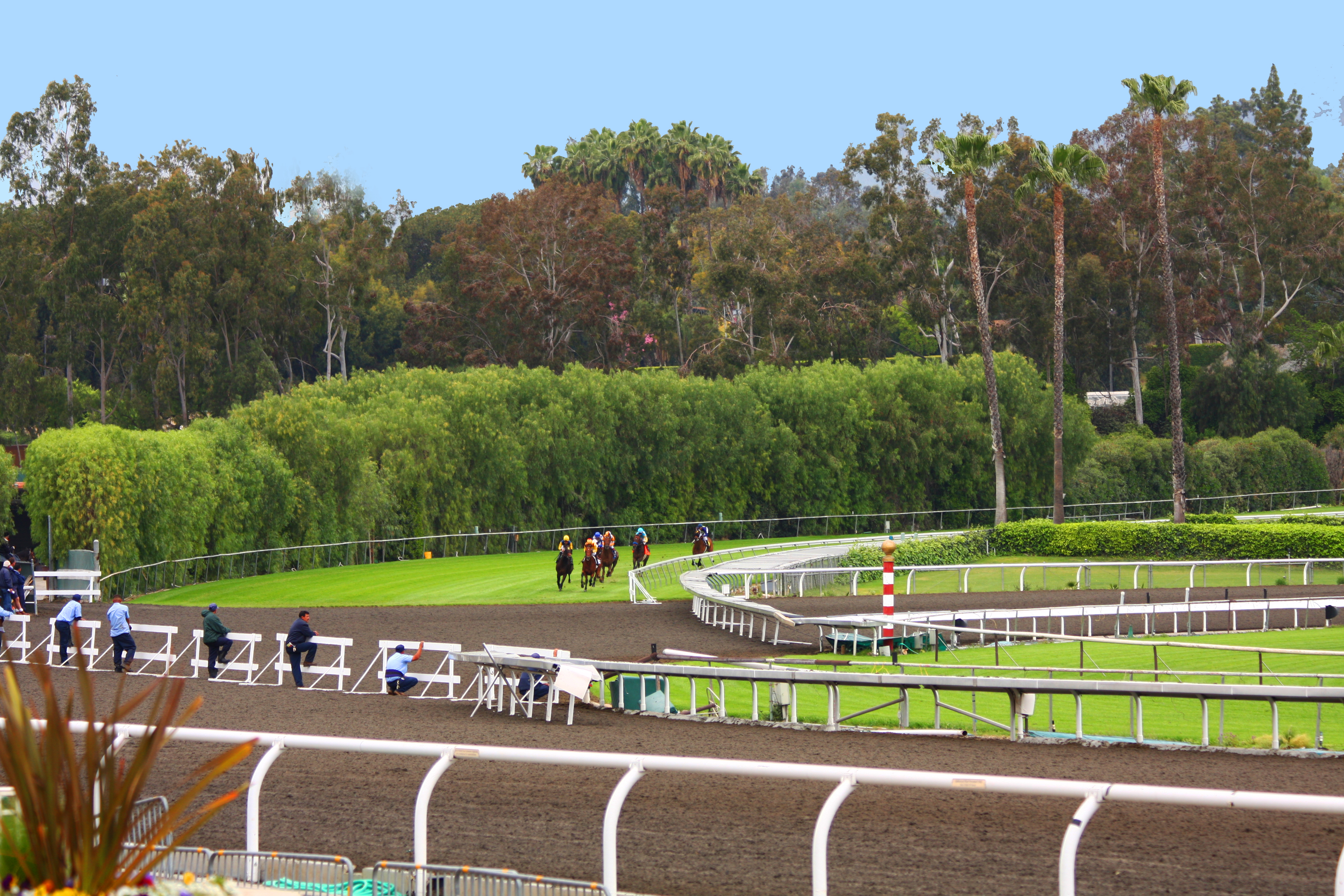
Santa Anita Park track

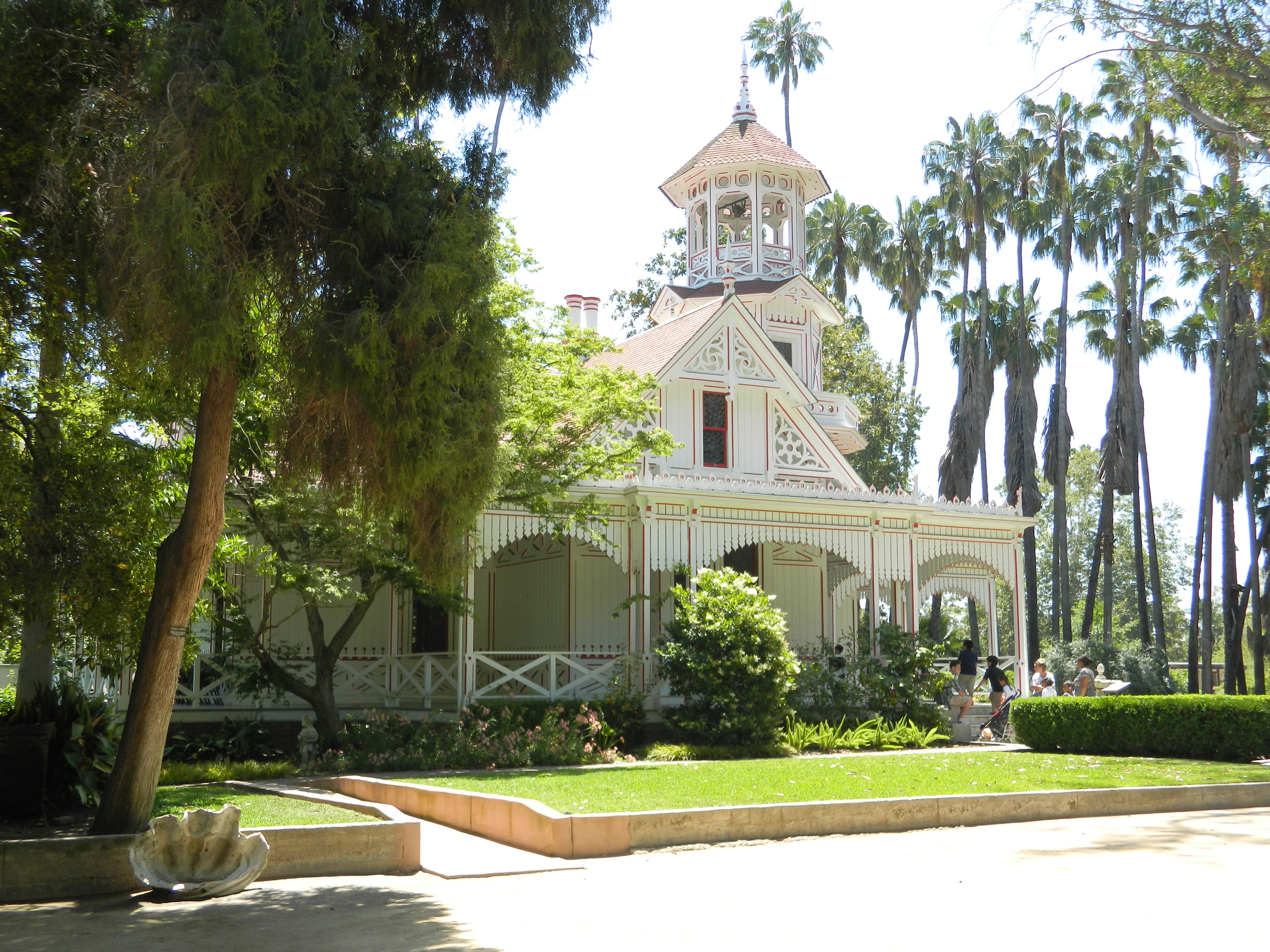
Queen Anne Cottage and Coach Barn

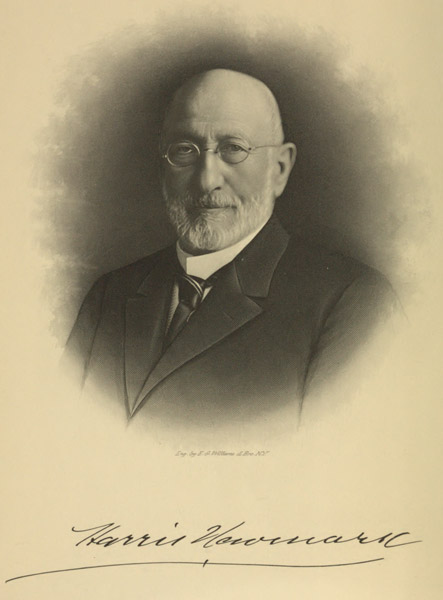
Harris Newmark

== See also ==
- Santa Anita Park
- Los Angeles County Arboretum and Botanic Garden
- Ranchos of California
- List of Ranchos of California
