= Mount San Antonio =

Highest peak of the San Gabriel Mountains in California, United States

- Mount Baldy
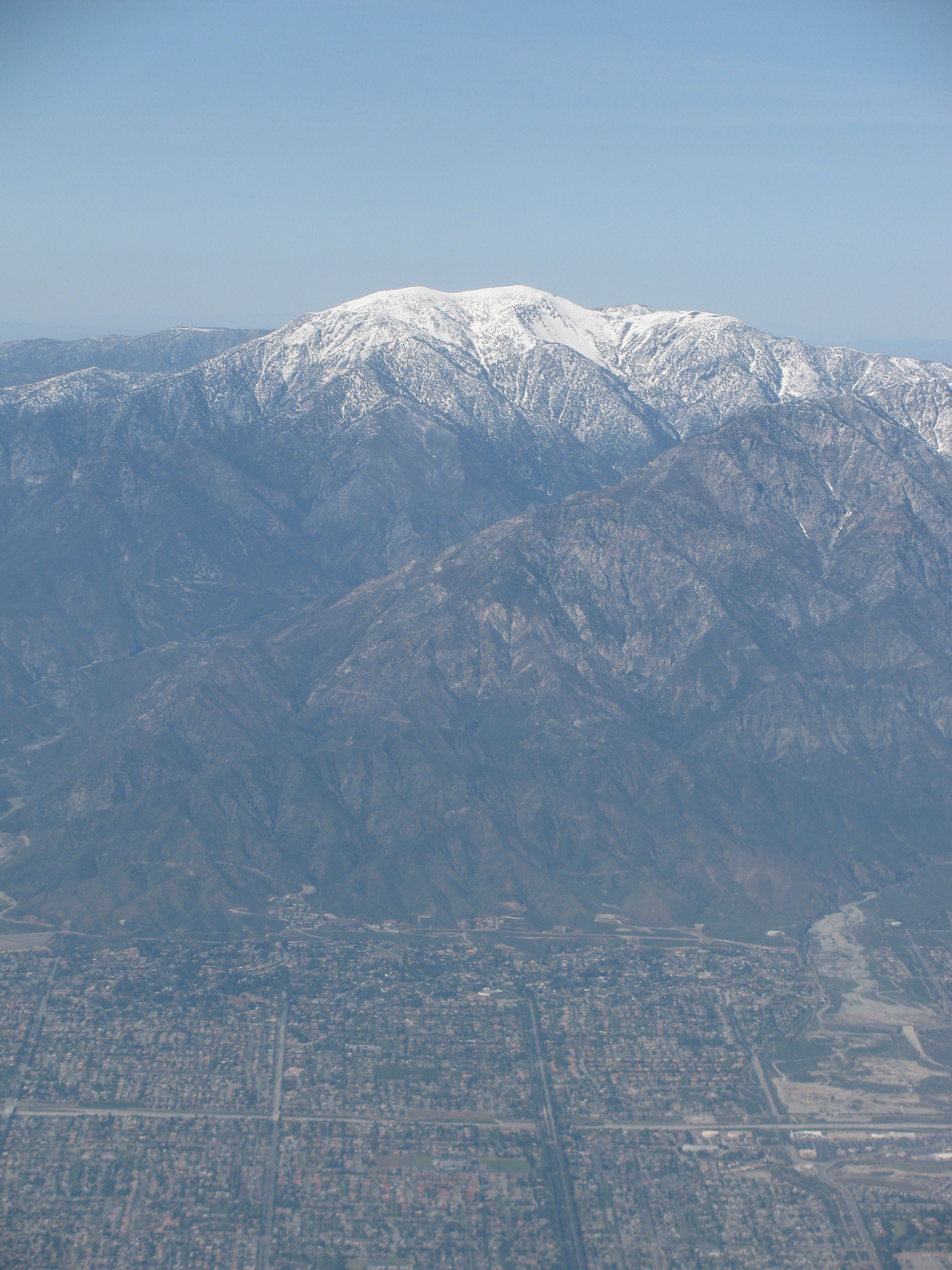
- South face of Mt. San Antonio, seen above Upland, California

Highest point
- Elevation: 10,068 ft (3,069 m); The National Map of the United States
- Prominence: 6,224 ft (1,897 m) ↓ Cajon Pass
- Isolation: 42.52 mi (68.43 km) → San Bernardino Peak
- Listing: US most prominent peaks 52nd; California county high points 14th; Three Saints; Hundred Peaks Section
- Coordinates: 34°17′20″N 117°38′48″W

Naming
- Etymology: Saint Anthony of Padua
- Native name: Yoát (Tongva); Avii Kwatiinyam (Mohave)

Geography
- Location within the Los Angeles metropolitan area Location within California Location within the United States
- Location: Los Angeles / San Bernardino counties, California U.S.
- Parent range: San Gabriel Mountains
- Topo map: USGS Mount San Antonio

Geology
- Mountain type: Granitic

Climbing
- Easiest route: Ski lift to Baldy Notch, Devil's Backbone Trail (hike)

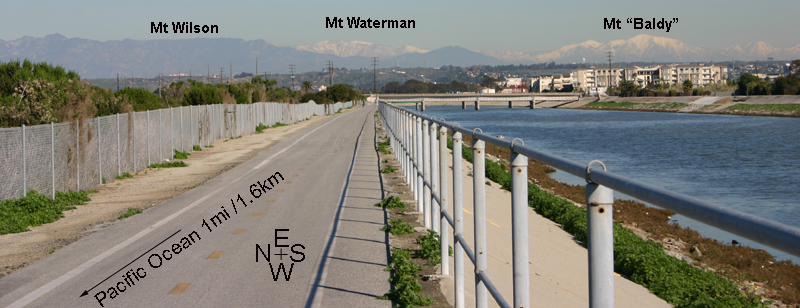
Mt. Baldy visible from Los Angeles’ Ballona Creek on a clear day

Mount San Antonio, commonly referred to as Mount Baldy or Old Baldy, is a 10,064 ft (3,068 m) summit in the San Gabriel Mountains on the border of Los Angeles and San Bernardino counties of California. Lying within the San Gabriel Mountains National Monument and Angeles National Forest, it is the highest point within the mountain range, the County of Los Angeles, and the Los Angeles metropolitan area.

Mount San Antonio's sometimes snow-capped peaks are visible on clear days and dominate the view of the Los Angeles Basin skyline. The peak and a subsidiary one to the west form a double summit of a steep-sided east–west ridge. The summit is accessible via a number of connecting ridges along hiking trails from the north, east, south, and southwest.

== Name ==
The Tongva call the mountain Yoát or Joat, which means snow, and the Mohave call it Avii Kwatiinyam. The name Mount San Antonio was probably bestowed by Antonio Maria Lugo, owner of a rancho near present-day Compton circa 1840, in honor of his patron saint, Anthony of Padua.

The mountain is almost always referred to as "Mount Baldy" by locals, to the point where many may not recognize the name "Mount San Antonio." When American settlers arrived and surveyed the land, "Baldy" – a reference to the bare fell-field of Baldy Bowl that dominates the south face visible from Los Angeles – became the predominant name, and it has stuck. Nonetheless, "Mount San Antonio" is still used by a number of institutions (e.g. Mount San Antonio College).

== Geography ==
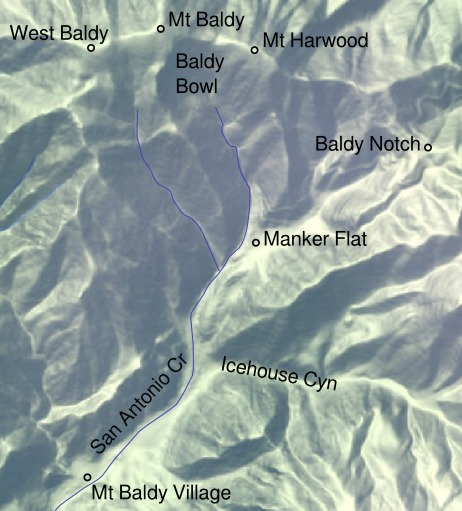
Map of Mt. San Antonio (main peak is labelled "Mt Baldy") and the region to the south and east.

Mt. San Antonio lies in the Angeles National Forest. Its summit is 10,064 feet (3,068 m), and marks the boundary between San Bernardino County and Los Angeles County. A sub-peak, West Baldy, is 10,002 feet (3,049 m).

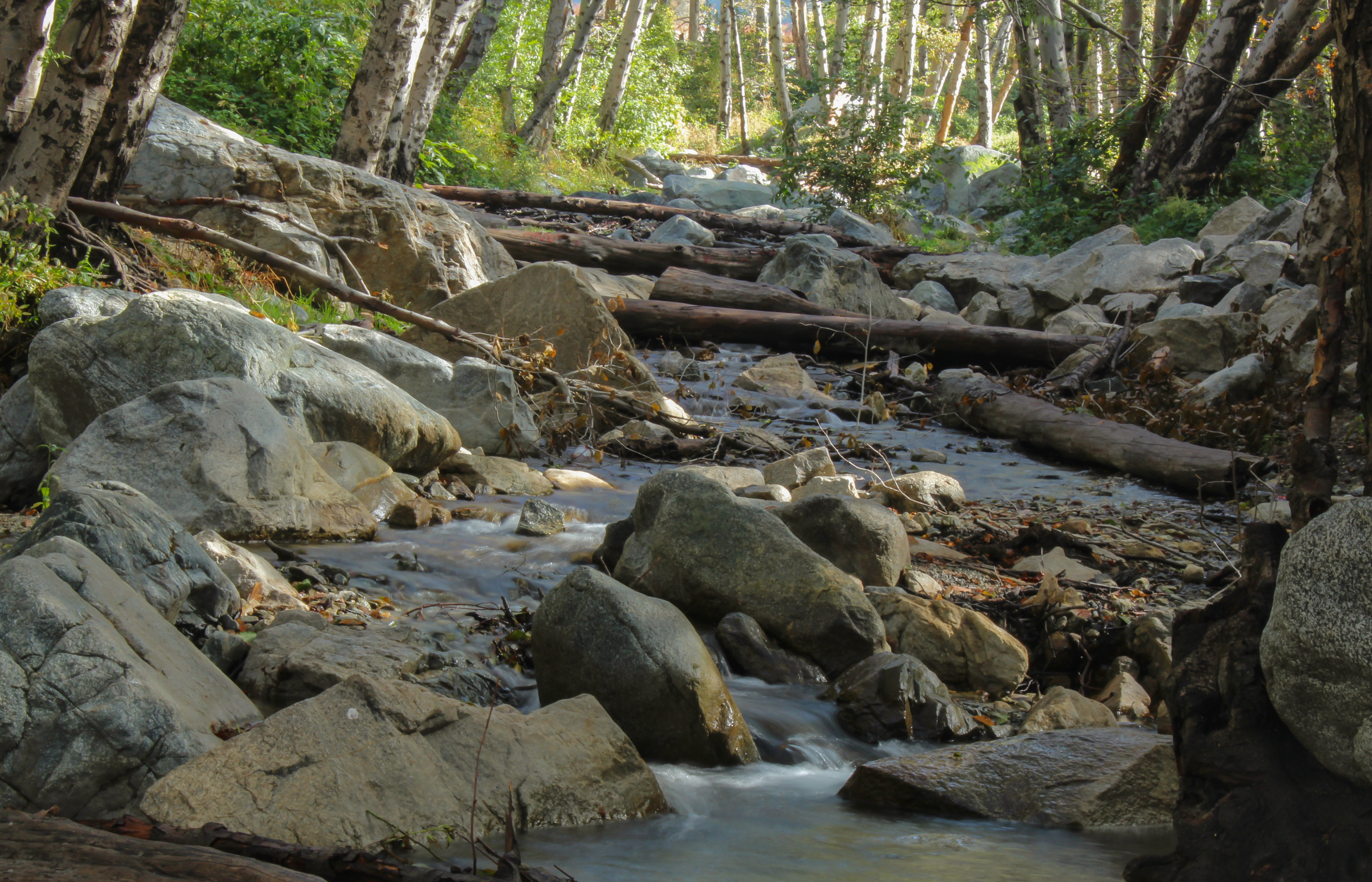
San Antonio Creek on Mount San Antonio

The mountain's southern watershed drains into San Antonio Creek, the north side into Lytle Creek and the Fish Fork of the San Gabriel River. San Antonio and Lytle Creeks are part of the Santa Ana River watershed. San Antonio Creek descends through a deep canyon which has several waterfalls, the last about 75 feet (23 m) high.

East of the summit is Mount Harwood, which is in turn connected by a narrow ridge, "The Devil's Backbone," to a pass known as the Baldy Notch. At the Notch there is a ski resort, the closest one to Los Angeles. South of the resort, and connected to its ski lift by an asphalt road, lies Mt Baldy Village.

There are no roads or maintained trails connecting the mountain to the less populated region to its north, but a use trail leads over Dawson Peak and Pine Mountain to Wright Mountain and the Pacific Crest Trail, overlooking the town of Wrightwood.

=== Climate ===
A weather station located around 7,700 feet was run during the 1960s; it recorded an average of 131 inches of snow per year. Snow peaks late in the season; in April 1967, 120 inches of snow fell.

== Natural history ==
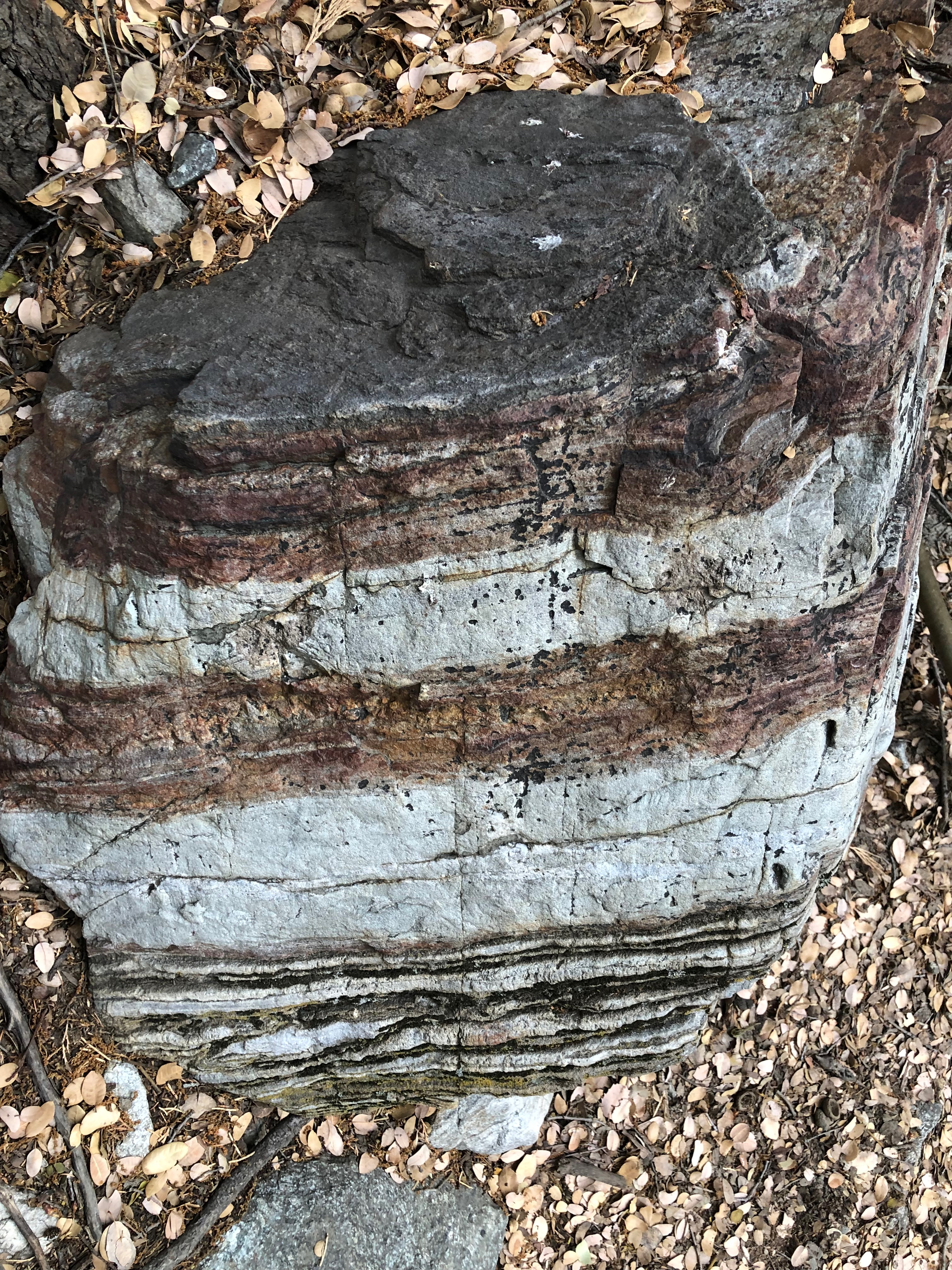
Proterozoic San Gabriel Gneiss Boulder on Mount San Antonio

=== Geology ===
Mount San Antonio lies in the front range of the San Gabriel Mountains, one of the Transverse Ranges of Southern California, formed around the San Andreas Fault system. The Transverse Ranges were formed because of a dog-leg bend in the San Andreas, which is a transform fault. The bend makes it difficult for the two plates to move smoothly past one another, and mountains were raised as a result.

The prehistoric Hog Back landslide lies in the canyon of San Antonio Creek at 4000' elevation. When the slide occurred, it dammed the river, whose depth built up until the water was released catastrophically, forming a slot canyon which now holds some of the area's few good rock climbing routes (difficulty 5.11, sport).

In modern times, notable floods have occurred in 1938 and 1969. The San Antonio Dam was completed in 1956, after a pause due to World War II, in an effort to prevent future floods as severe as the one in 1938, which damaged the low-elevation, highly populated areas below. The dam succeeded in significantly reducing the damage done by the 1969 flood. Hydroelectric plants along San Antonio Creek are tied to the electric grid.

=== Plants ===
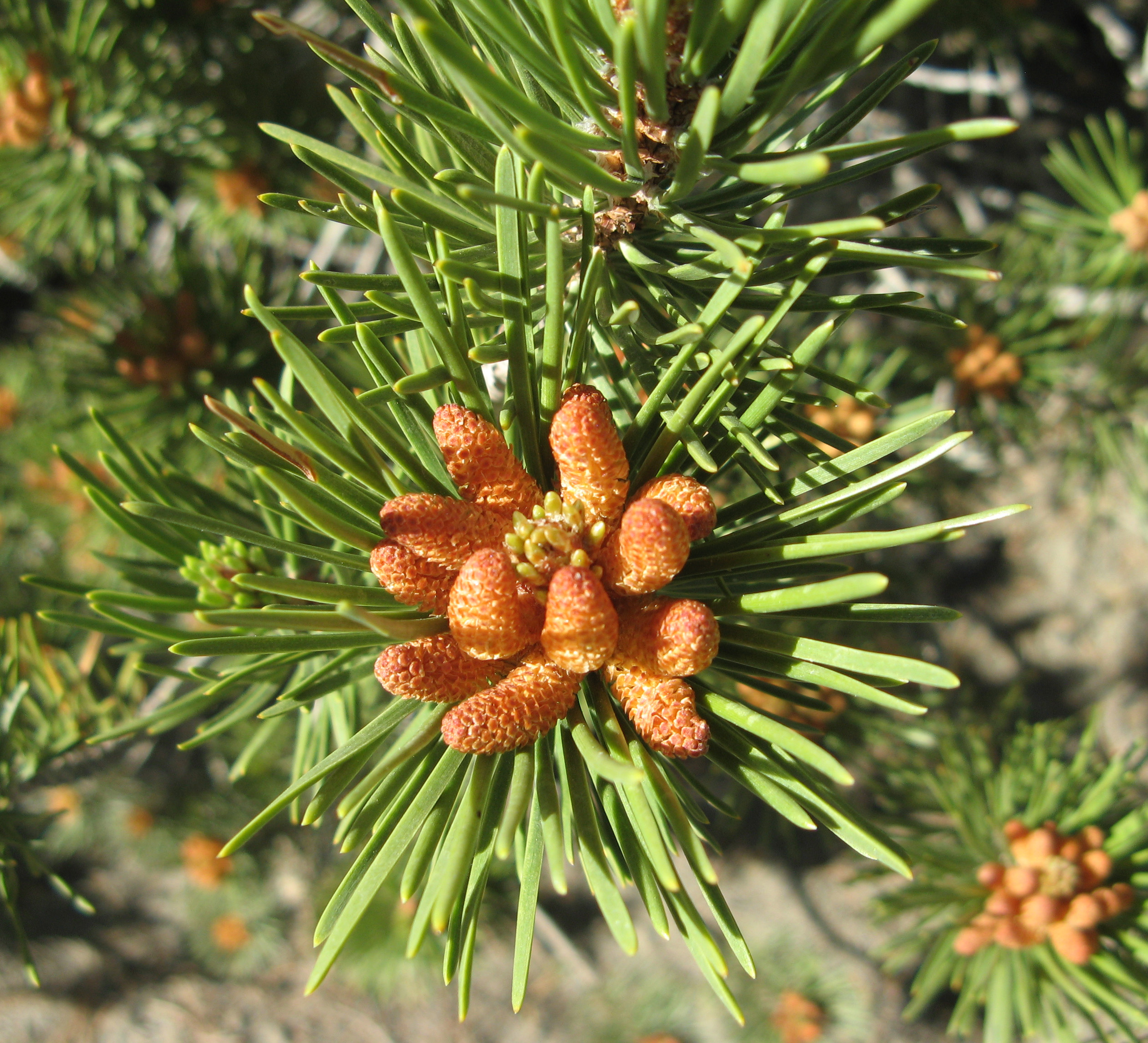
A cluster of pollen-bearing male cones of lodgepole pine on Mount San Antonio at around 8,500 ft

Aerial imagery of the terrain and vegetation of the slopes of Mount San Antonio.

The lower land area of the mountain consists of an ecological community known as yellow pine forest. Tree species include lodgepole pine, Jeffrey pine (also known as western yellow pine), white fir, and some sugar pine. These forests are fairly sparse, and are intermixed with chaparral and oak savannah.

Higher up, the yellow pine forest community gives way to a pure lodgepole forest. Near 9,000 ft (2,750 m) these become increasingly krummholzed, and beyond about 9,500 ft (2,900 m) lies an unforested alpine zone. Mountain mahogany trees grow on the slopes above San Antonio Creek.

The dominant shrubs at the higher elevations are manzanita and bush chinquapin. As the elevation increases, there is a higher ratio of chinquapin to manzanita. Other shrubs on the mountain include mountain whitethorn, buckwheat, and mountain gooseberry.

Wildflower species include Galium parishii, San Gabriel alumroot, gray monardella, pumice alpinegold, Parry's pussypaws, Nuttall's sandwort, and caulanthus. There are also Ross's sedge and rockcress. Oreonana vestita, a type of mountainparsley, is adapted to talus.

=== Animals ===
Desert bighorn sheep (Ovis canadensis nelsoni) are found in the area, mostly above 7000', and they lamb in the area. Their population is less threatened than those of other subspecies in California. Unlike animals of this subspecies in the Mojave Desert, those in the San Gabriel Mountains cannot be legally hunted and need not compete with aggressive feral burros for food or water.

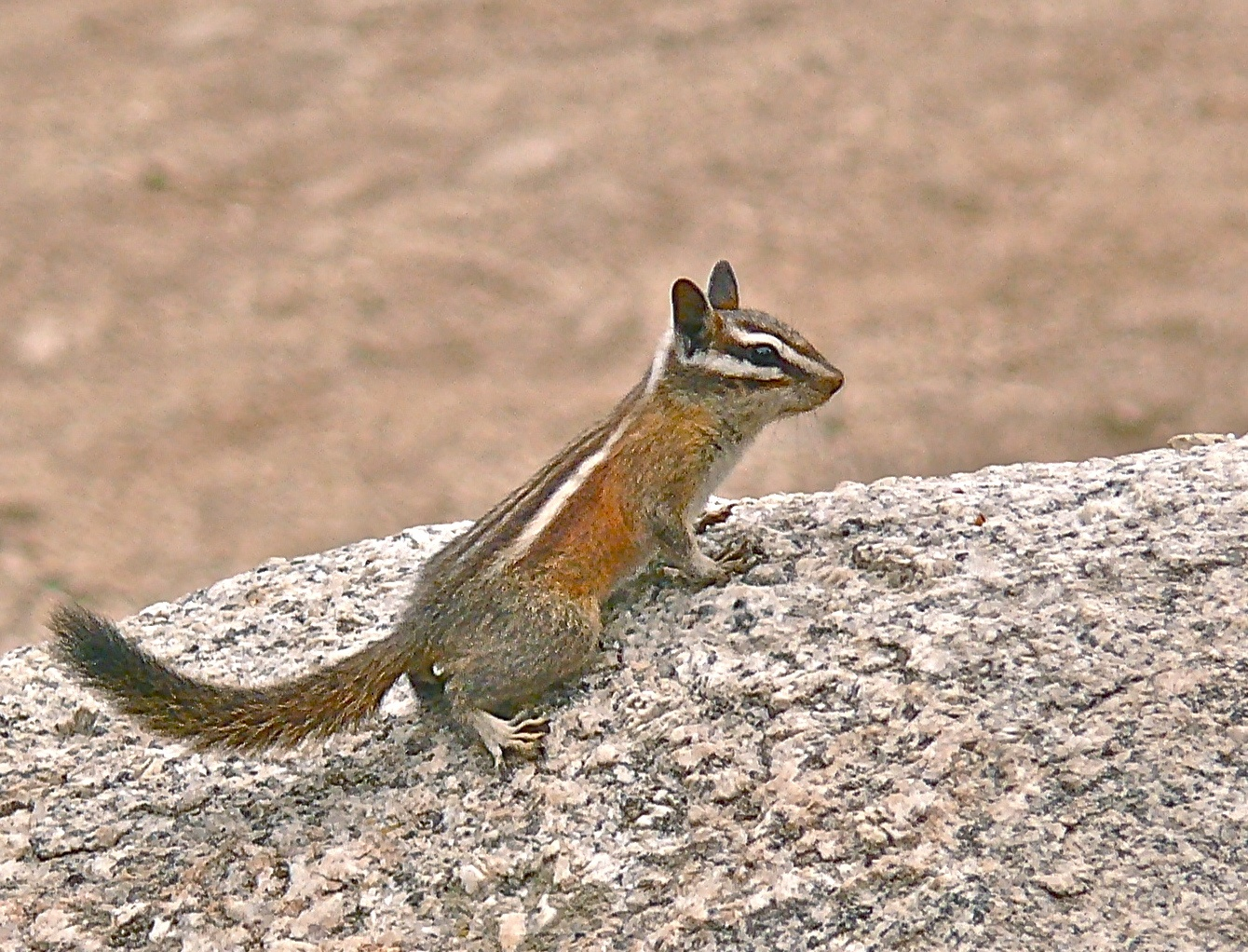
A lodgepole chipmunk (Neotamias speciosus)

Grizzly bears (Ursus arctos), featured on the state flag, were once common in the Transverse Ranges, but were driven to extinction in California in the late 19th century, with one of the last animals in the San Gabriels being shot in 1894 by Walter L. Richardson. Black bears (Ursus americanus) did not naturally exist in the San Gabriel Mountains, but in 1933 eleven black bears from Yosemite Valley that had shown problematic behavior were moved to Southern California and released near Crystal Lake. All black bears in the San Gabriels are believed to be descended from this group. Black bears are relatively shy and are almost never known to harm humans.

Rabbits and coyotes are found near San Antonio Creek at low elevations, typically below 2000'. The most common species of rabbits are the black-tailed jackrabbit (Lepus californicus) and the desert cottontail (Sylvilagus audubonii), the jackrabbit being distinguished by its huge ears. Western gray squirrels live in oak forests at low elevations, on both the south side and the desert side of the range. Merriam's chipmunk (Neotamias merriami) inhabits the San Gabriels in low-elevation areas containing manzanita, below the yellow pine forest community.

Rodents found at higher elevations in the San Gabriels include lodgepole chipmunks (Neotamias speciosus), all the way up to the tree line, and the California ground squirrel (Otospermophilus beecheyi) in the yellow pine forest on the south side of the range. They hibernate in winter. Rabbits may also occasionally be observed at high elevations.

The two species of chipmunk are difficult to distinguish visually, and firm identification may require examination of their pubic bones, but the lodgepole chipmunk has brighter white stripes. It is easier to distinguish the western gray squirrel (gray, with a white belly and a big, bushy tail) from the California ground squirrel, which is spotted and has a gray area on the back of its neck.

== Recreation ==
=== Trails ===
Hiking trails reach the summit from four sides of the mountain, and one can access the Devil's Backbone trail by skipping the Mt. Baldy Notch trail by taking Chair #1 at Mount Baldy Resorts during any season.

The trails vary in difficulty, and there are plenty of options for novices as well as experienced hikers.

Mt. Baldy Notch – (3.5 miles one way): The trail begins at Manker Flats, where the Baldy Notch Service Road can be taken to the notch. The trail provides scenic views at the notch, and other trails ahead.

Devil's Backbone – (3.2 miles one way from Notch): A service road at Mt. Baldy Notch leads to the Devil's Backbone trailhead and continues to the main peak.

Mt. Baldy Trail – (6.5 miles one way to Mt. Baldy Summit): This is the oldest and longest trail to the summit. Because it starts at Mt. Baldy Village, it has almost 6000' of elevation gain.

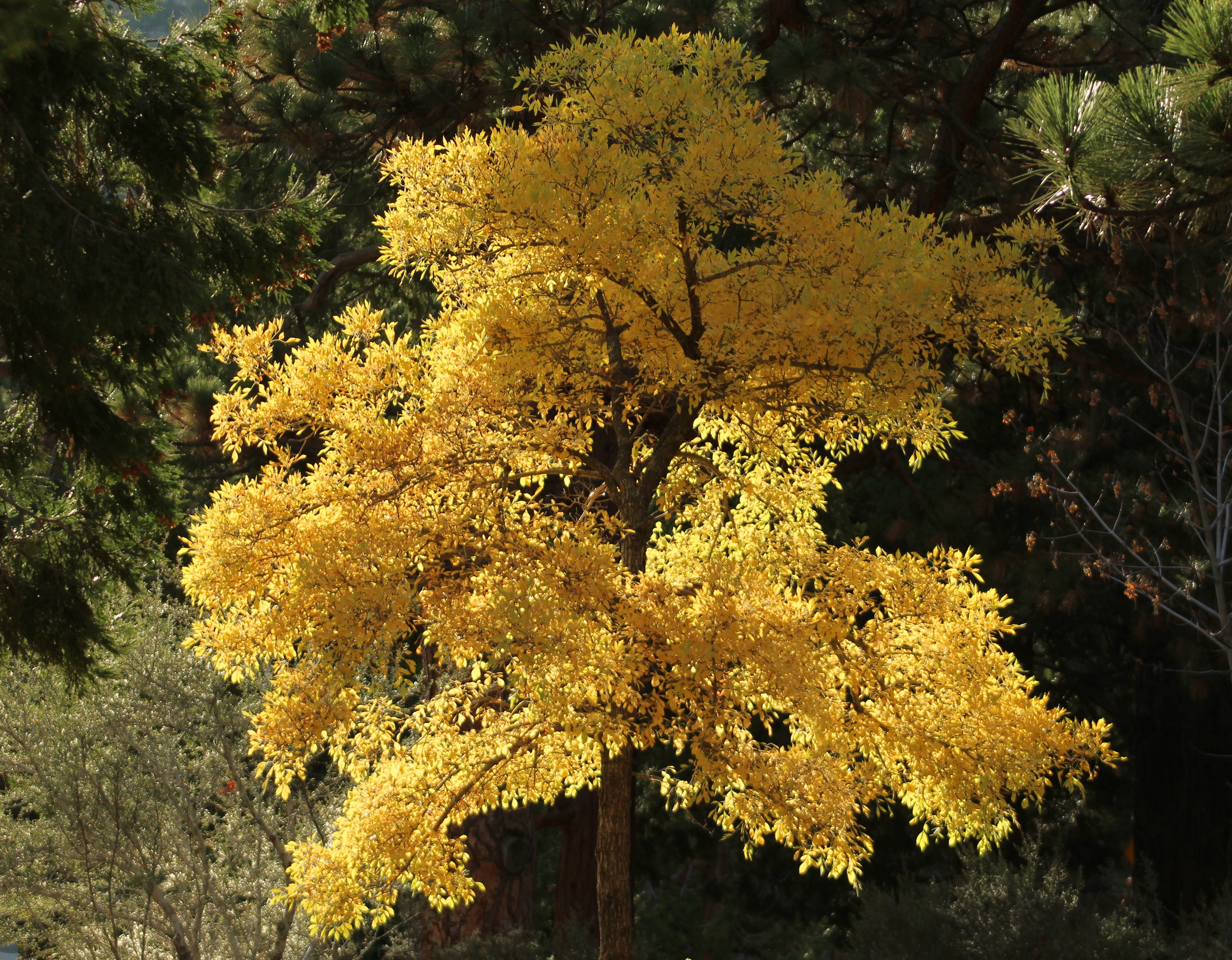
Fall color on Mount San Antonio

Icehouse Canyon – (3.7 miles one way): The Icehouse Canyon trail begins in the parking lot at Icehouse and goes all the way up to Icehouse Saddle where a number of trails can be taken either to the Notch or to nearby peaks such as Ontario and Cucamonga. (5.5 miles).

Ski Hut Trail – This trail follows the east side of the San Antonio Creek canyon to a small backcountry ski hut owned by the Sierra Club. A use trail continues around the left side of the bowl and then to the summit.

Three T’s – (5.3 miles one way): The trail starts and ends at the Icehouse Canyon Trailhead. It leads to views from the summits of Thunder, Timber and Telegraph Mountains.

North Backbone Trail – (6.9 miles one way): The trail is a use trail that starts near Wrightwood but also near Wright Mountain. The trailhead is on a dirt road near Blue Ridge on CA-2. It summits 2 peaks: Dawson Peak and Pine Mountain.

=== Winter mountaineering ===
During the winter, the mountain is typically covered in snow. As a result, the winter and spring offer a snow climbing challenge for mountaineers. The "Baldy Bowl" south of the summit is often climbed with crampons and ice ax, depending on snow conditions. The bowl can be treacherous for inexperienced climbers as some sections have slopes of 45° to 50°. Avalanches and rock fall are both hazards, and deaths or rescues from accidents along Devil's Backbone are a common occurrence. There are also a number of summer routes to the summit involving cross-country travel or scrambling, and it is possible to rappel down the canyon of San Antonio Creek.

=== Sierra Club hut ===
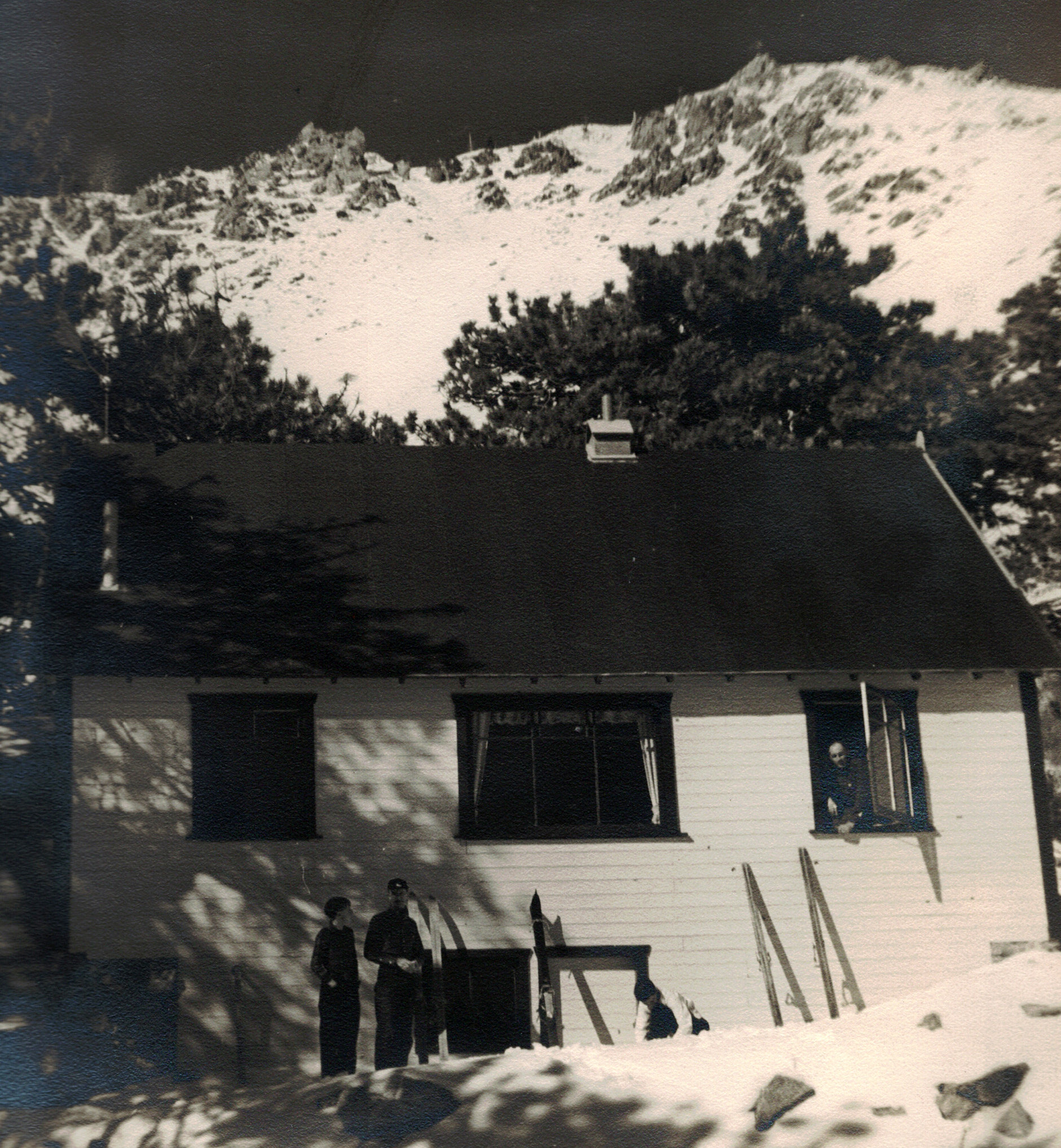
Mt. Baldy Hut 1937–1938

The ski hut is operated by the Sierra Club Angeles Chapter and available for year-round use on weekends. It marks the approximate halfway point on the Ski Hut Trail, at an elevation of 8,200 ft. It has a fully-equipped kitchen, piped water, solar lighting, a wood-burning stove, dormitory loft beds for about sixteen visitors, and an outhouse with a view. The hut is located at the base of Baldy Bowl, recognized as a superb skiing area in the early 1930s. The Ski Mountaineers section of the Sierra Club, formed in 1935, was granted permission by the U.S. Forest Service to construct a hut in this location.

The hut was built by volunteers, who carried all of the building materials up on their backs; it was completed in January 1936. The original hut burned to the ground on September 20, 1936, but was rebuilt, using burros to transport the building supplies, with the replacement hut completed that winter. The rebuilt hut is preserved as much as possible in its original condition, except that the women’s dormitory has been converted to a tool and storage room, and the failing roof panels had to be replaced, again transported to the hut by human power.

=== Camping ===
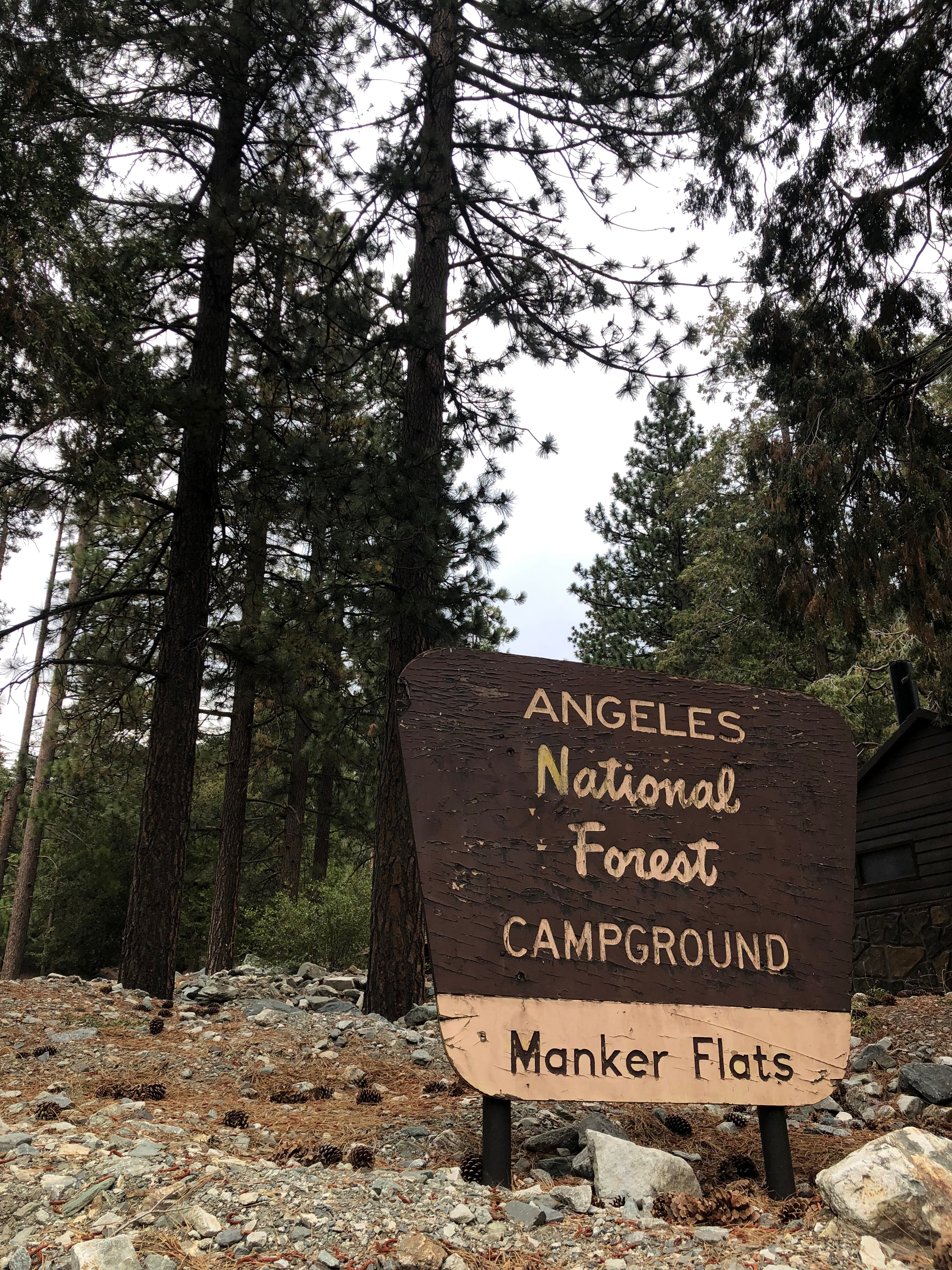
Manker Flats Campground on Mount San Antonio

Manker Flats Campground is available for the public to camp in on a first come-first served mechanism. It is located 3 miles northeast of Mt. Baldy Village on Mt. Baldy road, in an open pine forest. It boasts 21 campsites with features such as stoves, piped water, toilets and tables. However, there are no facilities for showers or sanitary disposal. Fees for camping overnight are $12 per night, and an additional $5 for extra vehicles.

=== Cycling ===
For road cyclists, the climb through Mt. Baldy Village to the base of the ski lifts is popular. It has been used as the finish of the penultimate stage of the 2011, 2012, 2015 and 2019 Amgen Tour of California. It was also featured in the 2017 Tour of California as the fifth stage of the race.

=== Running ===
Since 1965, each Labor Day, the San Antonio Canyon Town Hall has sponsored a "Run to the Top" on Mt. Baldy in which a 8-mile (13 km) course over roads and trails ends at the main peak for an approximately 4,000-foot (1,200 m) elevation gain.

=== Hunting ===
Hunting is allowed, but is regulated and requires a license.

== History ==
=== Exploitation of resources ===
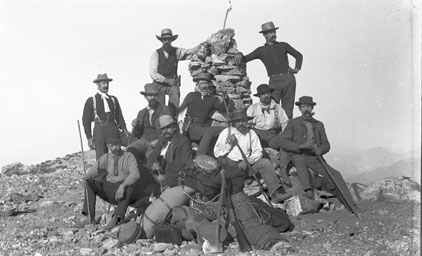
A group of hunters at the summit of Mt. Baldy, ca. 1890

The first development in the area came in the Civil War era, and was focused on exploitation of the area's resources both by independent homesteaders and for use by the populated lowland areas. Some of the first people to live permanently in the area were Mormon settlers in Lytle Creek Canyon (1851), orange farmer Madison Kincaid (1865) and fruit farmer and beekeeper A.A. Dexter (ca. 1875). A sawmill was built in 1870 upstream from today's Mt. Baldy Village, but it either burned down or was destroyed in the flood of 1884.

Ever since 1882, the San Antonio Water Company has controlled the water rights in San Antonio Canyon, including its three hydroelectric plants.

A tributary of San Antonio Creek flows through what is now known as Icehouse Canyon. Because the canyon is deep, its north-facing slope retains snow late into the spring, and in 1859 Victor Beaudry and Damien Marchessault built an icehouse there. The ice was brought down from the mountains to Los Angeles by mule and wagon and sold door to door, as well as being used at Beaudry and Marchessault's ice cream saloon, the only one in the city. (Marchesseault was later mayor of Los Angeles.)

Fletcher Manker, in his uniform as fire chief of Upland.

Gold mining did not begin in the area until decades after the California Gold Rush, with the earliest historical record being of the death of miner Jacob Skinner in 1879 in his mine at the Hog Back slide. Placer mining gave way to hydraulic mining in the 1880s and continued through the 90's. The Banks (Hocumac) Mine was built in 1893 near the Baldy Notch. It was supplied with water by a mile-long pipeline, remnants of which can still be seen, running all the way from San Antonio Creek. The remains of the Gold Ridge Diggings (a.k.a. Agamemnon mine) (1897-ca. 1904) are found near the headwaters of San Antonio Canyon, in the canyon below the Ski Hut. The miners were kept supplied by sheep hunter turned merchant Fred Dell, who built Dell's Camp near the present Mt. Baldy Village, and by mule driver Fletcher Manker, who built a store at what is now known as Manker Flat. Gold mining began in Icehouse Canyon in 1892. The Hocumac and Gold Ridge mines were unsuccessful due to the uncertain water supply, the low amount of gold in the ore, and a water-pollution lawsuit filed by downslope farmers.

=== Resort era ===
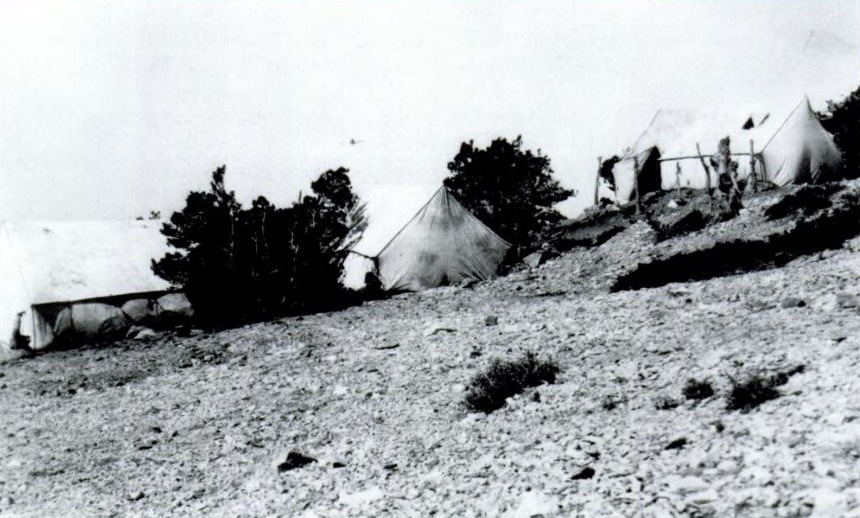
Dell's Summit Inn, just below the top of the mountain, ca. 1910–1913.

The late 19th century saw increased interest in the area for its own qualities and for recreation rather than for its resources. In 1875 an army surveying party made the first recorded ascent to the mountain's summit, via Lytle Creek, and estimated the height of the peak. In 1880, W.H. Stoddard, brother-in-law of railroad baron Collis P. Huntington, built a resort in what is now called Stoddard Canyon. Frank Keyes converted Dell's Camp from a mining support station into a rental resort. Early mountain guide William B. Dewey led parties of guests to the summit on a loop corresponding to the present-day Mt. Baldy Trail and Devil's Backbone Trail. Rental cabins were also built in Evey Canyon. Access to the upper canyon was impeded by the precarious nature of the trail going over the Hog Back slide, but by the turn of the century Dell's Camp nevertheless entertained as many as a hundred guests in a weekend.

Charles Baynham built a second camp nearby in 1907, and in the following year the canyon became accessible by automobile. In 1910, Dewey built the Baldy Summit Inn, 80 feet below the mountaintop. Despite the grand name, it consisted of only a set of tents and some storage buildings. It was damaged by a cooking fire in 1913 and never rebuilt. By the early 1920s there were numerous trail camps and resorts such as the Icehouse Canyon Resort, Bear Canyon Resort Eleven Oaks, Baynham Camp, Alpine Woods, Trail Inn, Snow Crest, and Kelly's Camp.

The shift from exploitation of natural resources to recreational use of San Antonio Canyon resulted in a series of bitter conflicts between the San Antonio Water Company and the camp owners. Pollution of the watershed and an 1899 brush fire led the company to buy Dell's Camp and close it, wrest legal control of the road away from Baynham, close off the canyon with locked gates, and station armed guards to keep out intruders. But after some time and various legal battles, the company decided to profit from recreation rather than discouraging it. It bought Baynham's Camp in 1907 but then hired Baynham to manage it, charging tolls on the road from 1908 to 1922. The camp was renamed Camp Baldy in 1910.

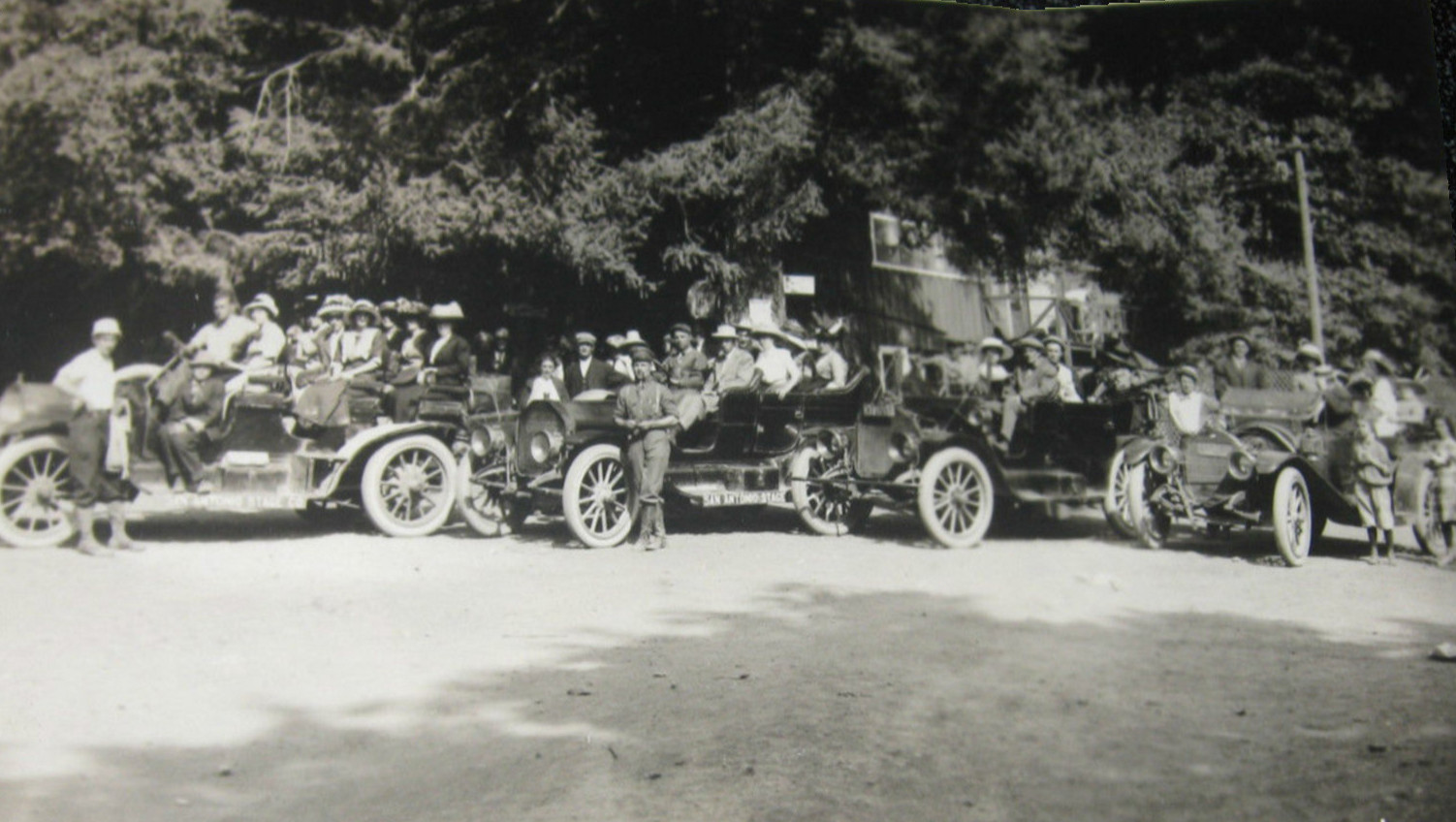
Motorists at Camp Baldy, 1919

When the area became a national forest in 1908, the forest service began offering 99-year leases of plots of land in Icehouse Canyon for vacation cabins. By 1938 there were 105 cabins and additional cabins at a resort owned by the Chapman family. Leases were also sold, both by the government and by the water company, at Camp Baldy and Manker Flat.

Between 1922 and 1927 American physicist Albert A. Michelson performed a number of experiments involving bouncing a beam of light off a reflector at Lookout Mountain, a prominence 3.2 miles (5.1 km) southwest of the peak, from the observatory at Mount Wilson some 22 miles (35 km) away.

=== Prohibition and Great Depression ===
During Prohibition, the area became known as a place where one could get a drink away from the watchful eyes of the police. Former Yosemite concessionaire Foster Curry (Curry Village), his wife Ruth Curry, and Ruth's second husband, movie star Edmund Burns, turned Camp Baldy into a playground for affluent residents of Los Angeles, with a swimming pool, casino, and a dance pavilion.

In 1935–1936 the Civilian Conservation Corps built a wide trail along the Devil's Backbone from Mt. Baldy Notch to the summit, a route which had previously been narrow and dangerous due to the precipitous drops on one, or in some areas both, sides. The trail is still relatively dangerous, with hikers occasionally falling to their deaths.

Aurelia Harwood, the first female president of the Sierra Club, was active in the area. Mount Harwood, a subsidiary peak of Mount Baldy, is named for her. The Sierra Club built a lodge, also named after her, at Manker Flats in 1930. It is open to Sierra Club members. In 1935 the club added a mountain hut, known as the "ski hut," by the base of the Baldy Bowl near the headwaters of San Antonio Creek. The ski hut burned down that year but was immediately replaced and remains standing today.

=== After the 1938 flood ===
The flood of 1938 destroyed most of the human-made structures in Camp Baldy and Icehouse Canyon. The casino was destroyed, but the hotel (today's Buckhorn Lodge) survived. No new building has been allowed in Icehouse Canyon, and the Icehouse Canyon resort was destroyed in 1988 by a suspicious fire. Camp Baldy was rebuilt and later became Mt. Baldy Village.

During a snow storm on March 2, 1949, two Marine Corps Hellcat fighter planes were flying in formation in an instrument training exercise when they crashed into the west side of the summit's south ridge. Dozens of pieces of wreckage were scattered across the slope just below the present location of the Ski Hut Trail, and are not noticeable to casual observation from the trail only because they are overgrown with brush.

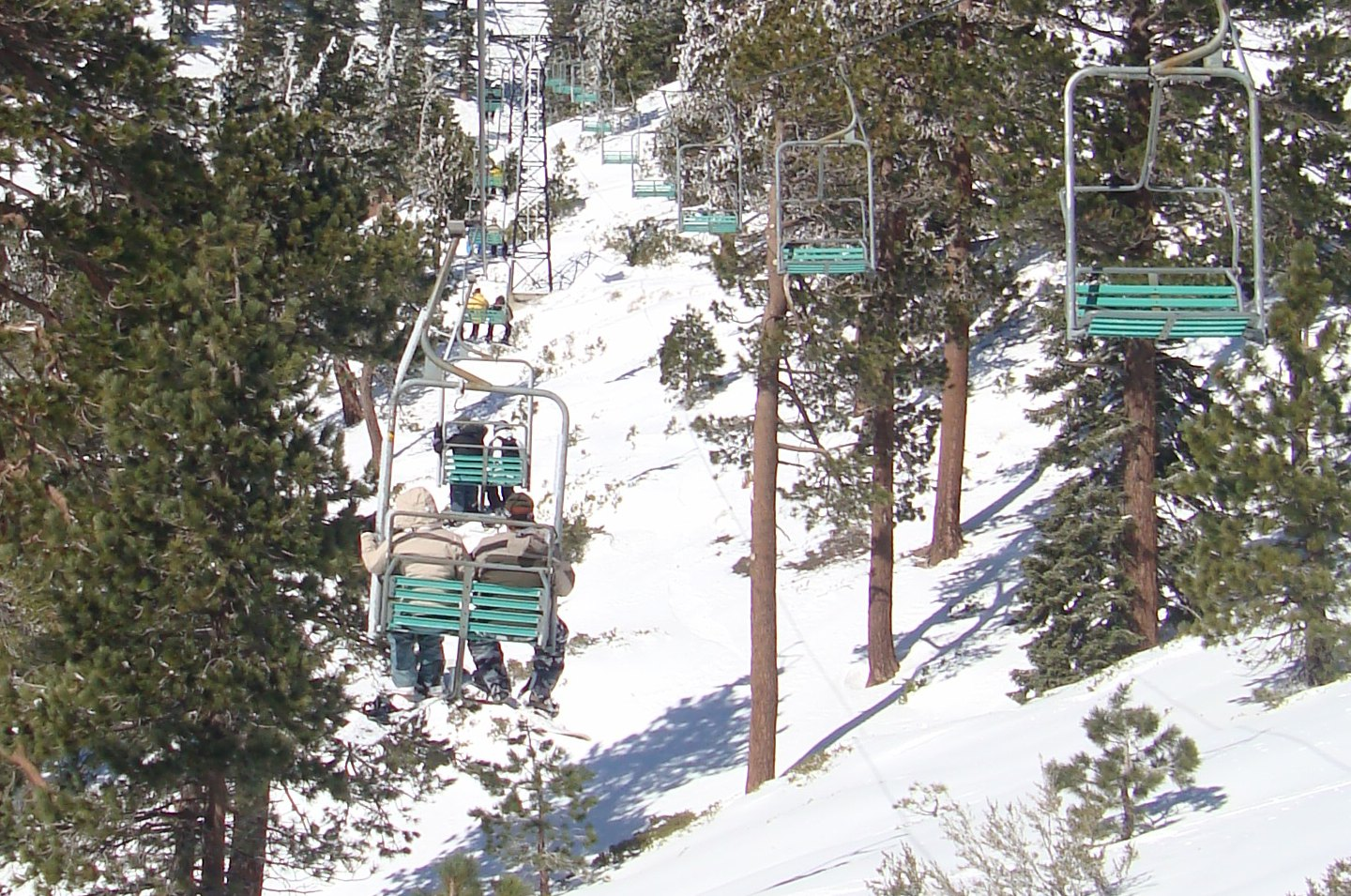
Mt. Baldy ski area

The ski lift dates to 1952 and was expanded and modernized in 1975. As the surviving privately owned cabins in Icehouse Canyon, Baldy Village, and Manker Flats come to the end of their 99-year leases on their lots, the Forest Service, no longer wishing to be a landlord, was converting them to private ownership. A Zen Center was established at Manker Flats in 1971. As of 2018, the only resorts and lodges serving the general public are the Mt. Baldy Lodge and Buckhorn Lodge in Mt. Baldy Village, and there is also a restaurant at the Baldy Notch ski area. The Snow Crest Lodge at Manker Flat is closed and being renovated.

Today, Mt. Baldy Village has its own fire department, church, visitor center and school district. Mt. Baldy School (the abbreviation is the standard usage) has about 105 students. The visitor center is tended by unpaid volunteer rangers. As of 2013, the Forest Service does not have any paid rangers on duty in the area.

On 13 January 2023, the English actor Julian Sands, a dedicated mountaineer, went missing while hiking in Mount San Antonio. His remains were found by hikers on 24 June 2023. In 2025, three hikers were found dead during a search for one missing hiker.

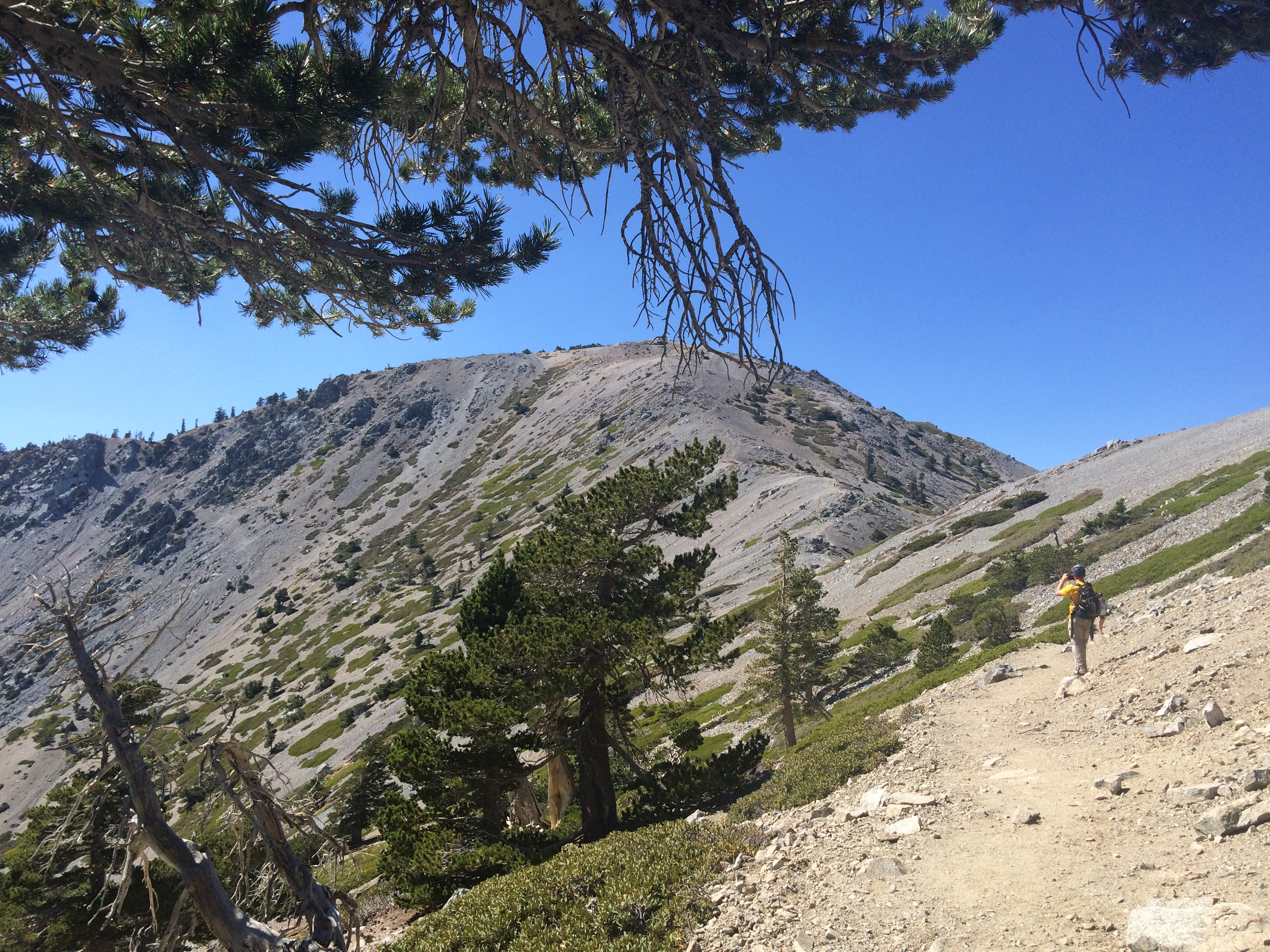
Looking northwest at Baldy Summit from Devil's Backbone near Mt. Harwood

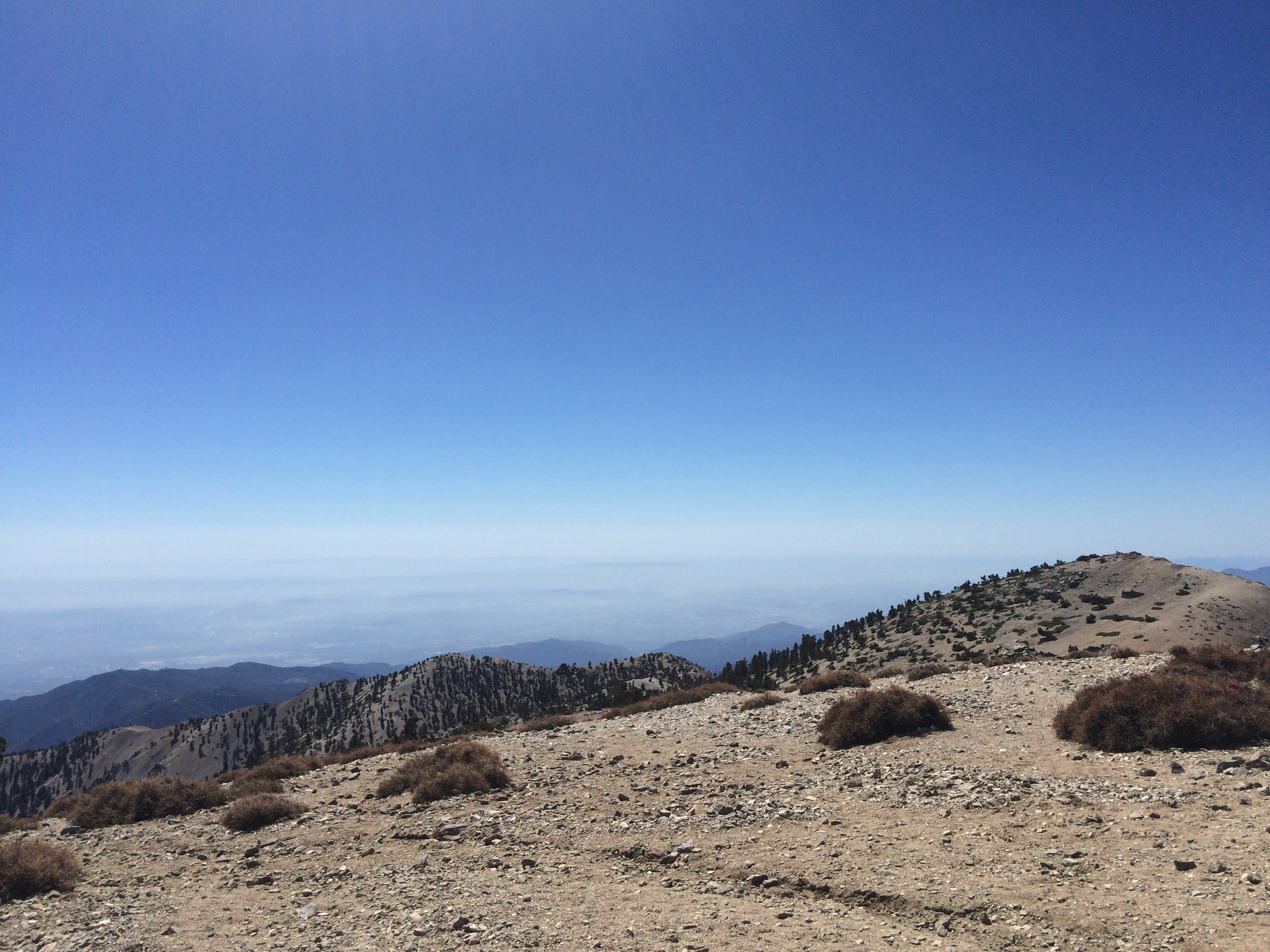
Looking southwest from Mt. Baldy Summit

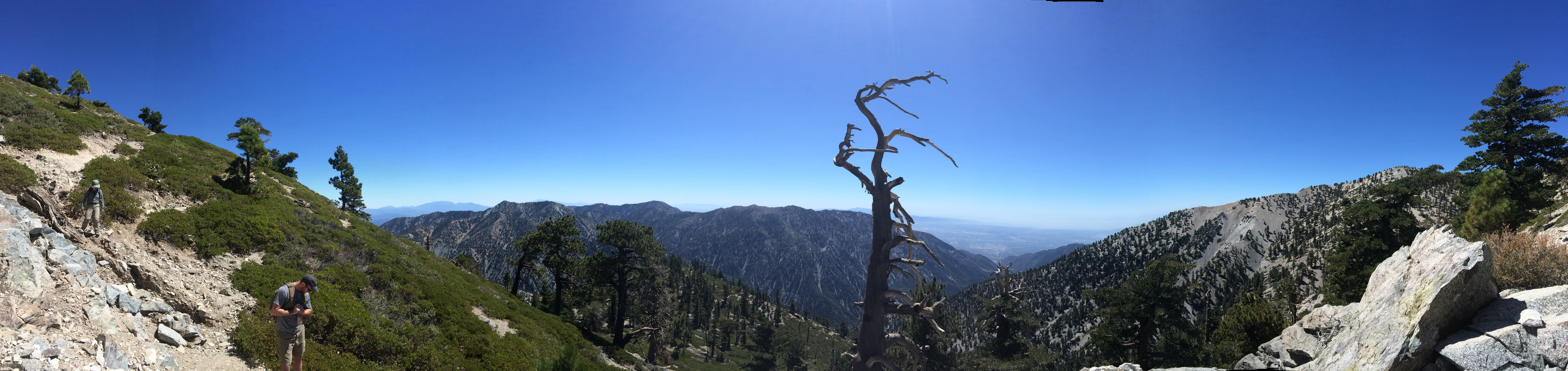
Panorama looking south toward Los Angeles just below the summit

== See also ==
- List of highest points in California by county
- List of Ultras of the United States
- Mount Baldy Ski Lifts
- Mt. Baldy Joint School District
- Mt. San Antonio College
- San Gabriel Mountains National Monument
