= Mount Harwood =

Mountain in California, United States

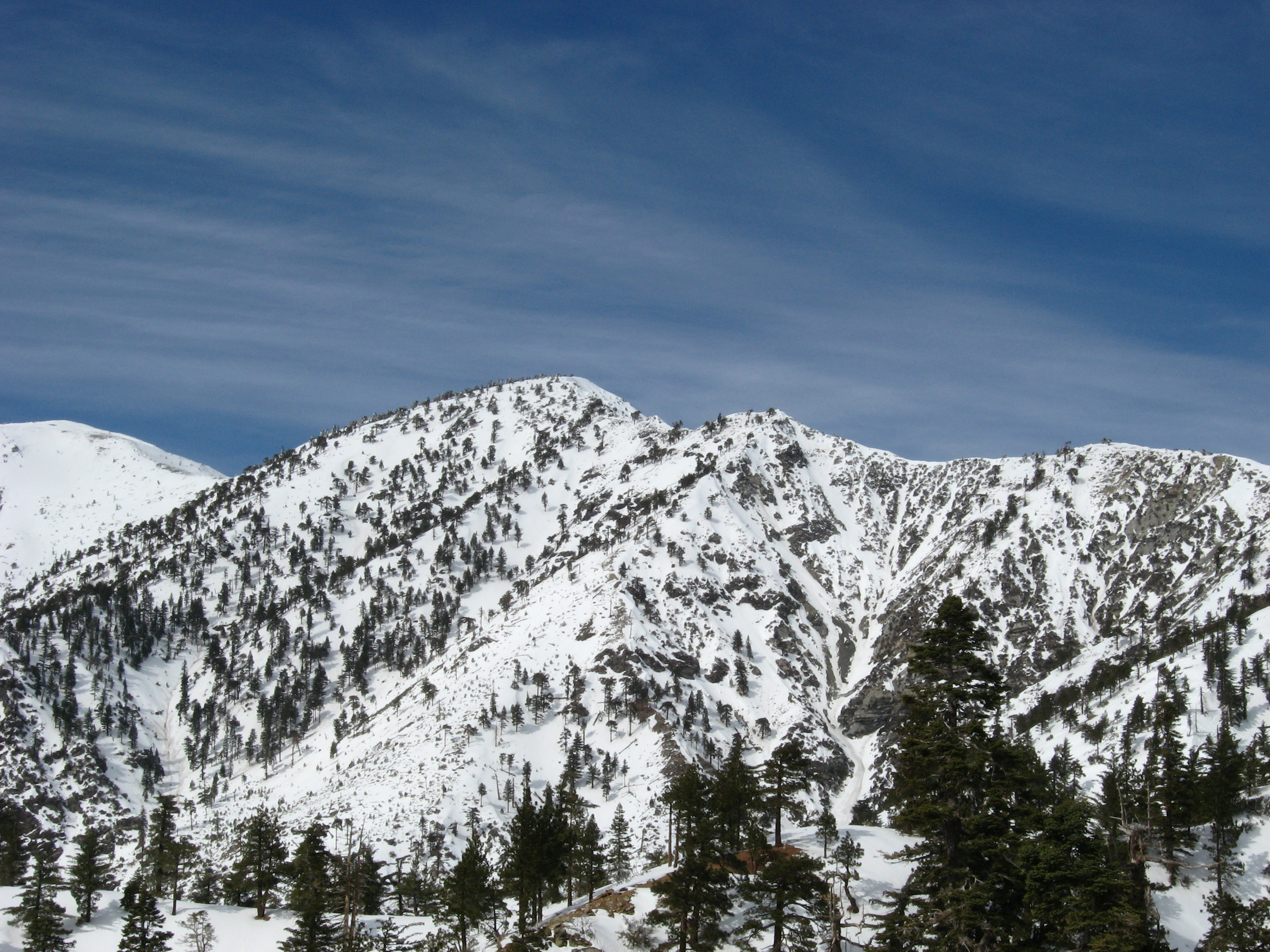
- Mount Harwood (center) and Devil's Backbone (right) from the southeast, February 2008.

Highest point
- Elevation: 9,556 ft (2,913 m) NAVD 88
- Prominence: 152 ft (46 m)
- Parent peak: Mount San Antonio
- Listing: Hundred Peaks Section
- Coordinates: 34°17′11″N 117°37′59″W

Geography
- Location: San Bernardino County, California, U.S.
- Parent range: San Gabriel Mountains
- Topo map: USGS Mount San Antonio

Climbing
- Easiest route: Hike, class 1

Mount Harwood is the first summit east of Mount San Antonio. The United States Geological Survey recognized the name to honor California educator and conservationist Aurelia Squire Harwood in 1965. Prior to this, the peak now known as Thunder Mountain was also referred to as Mount Harwood. Mount Harwood is located on the East side of the San Gabriel Mountains in the Angeles National Forest near the San Bernardino-Los Angeles county border. In this area of the San Gabriel Mountains the peaks are the highest. Because of the elevation Mount Harwood turns out to be ranked the 4th highest peak in the San Gabriel mountains after Dawson Peak, Mount San Antonio or "Old Baldy" being the highest at 10,064 feet (3,068 m). The only way for hikers or tourists to access Mount Harwood is to take Mt. Baldy Road off I-210. A National Forest Adventure pass/ National Park access pass must be displayed on a vehicle to access Mount Harwood.

== Gallery ==
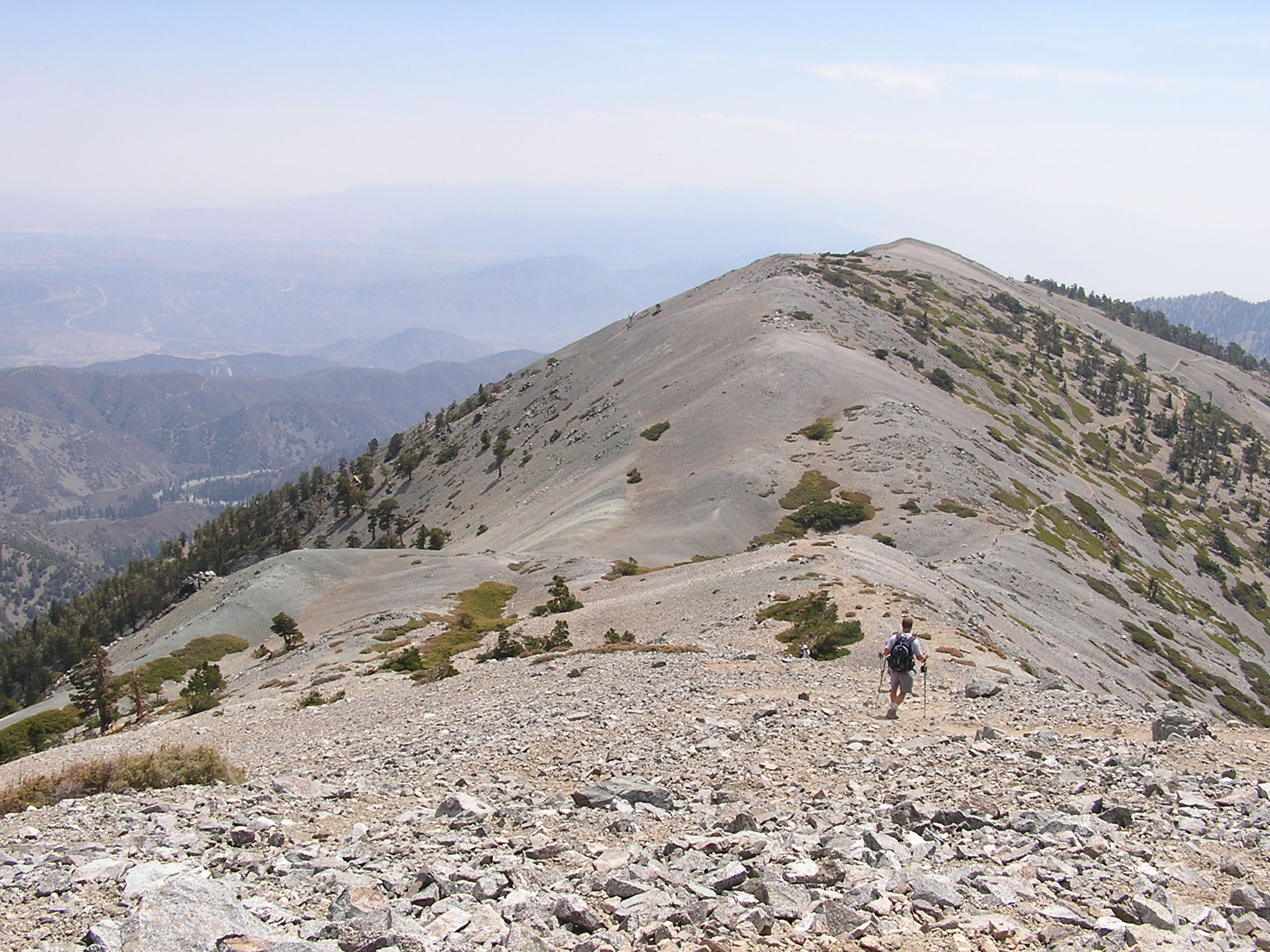
Mount Harwood's west ridge, August 2007. Devil's Backbone Trail passes the summit to the right.

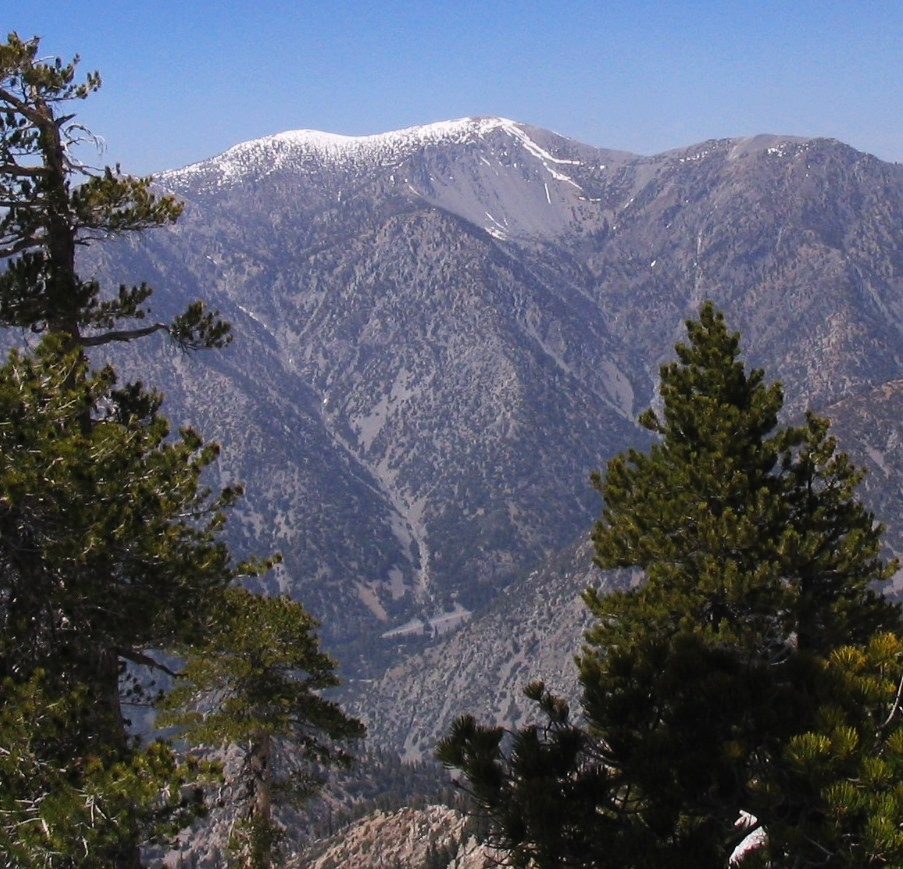
Mount Harwood (right), beside Mount San Antonio (center).

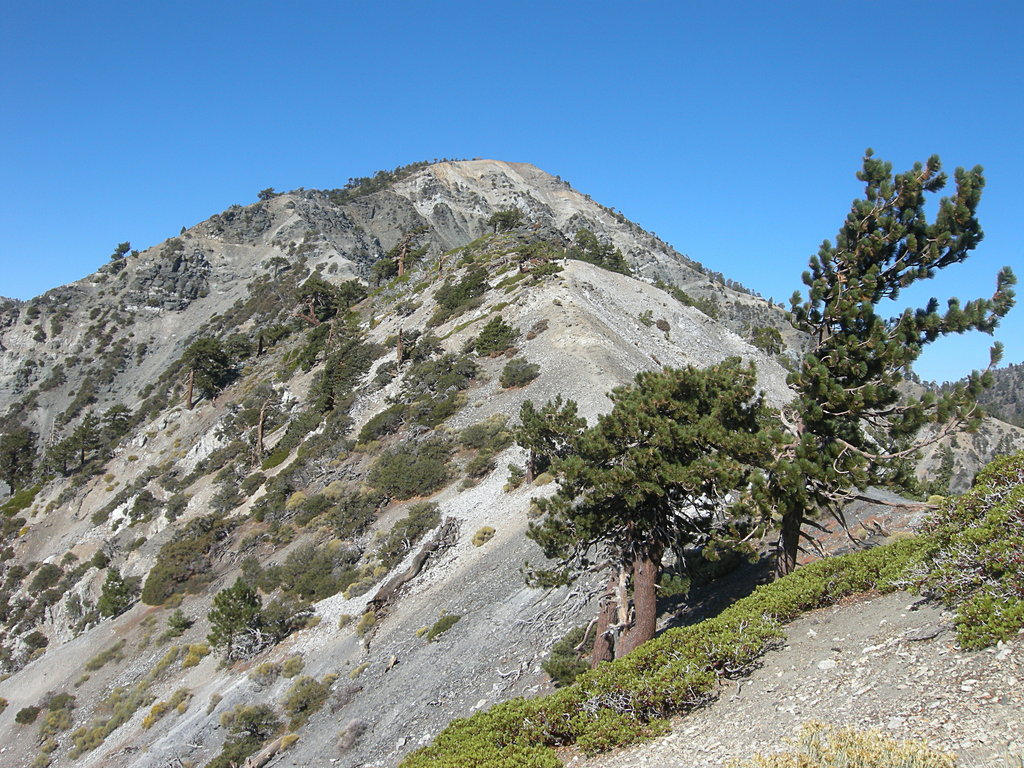
Mount Harwood from Devils Backbone Trail.
