= Baldy Bowl =

Fluvial cirque in Los Angeles County, California, United States

Coordinates: 34.283°N 117.640°W

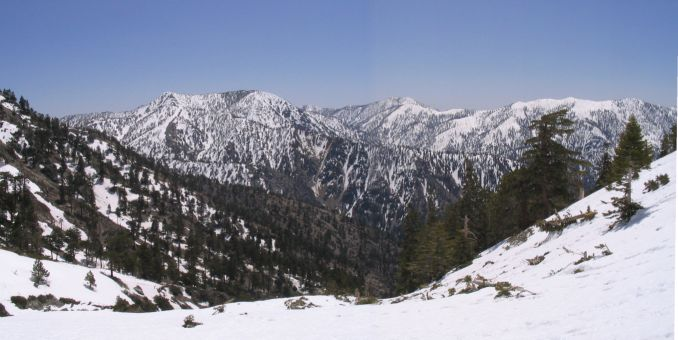
Winter looking towards the bottom of Baldy Bowl

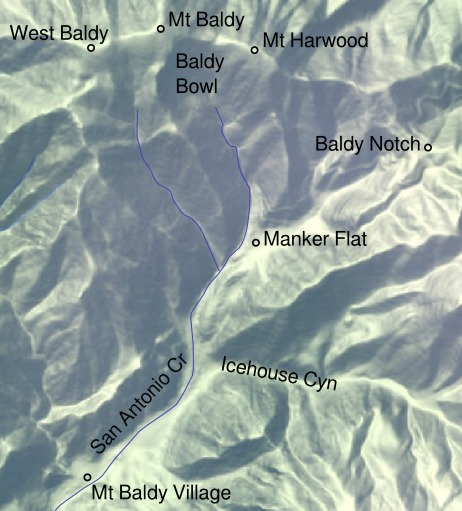
Map of the Mount San Antonio massif

Baldy Bowl is a fluvial cirque, in the San Gabriel Mountains of the U.S. state of California, that forms much of the upper south face of Mount San Antonio. It is one of the most visited backcountry locales in the San Gabriels, and is popular with skiers, hikers, and climbers. It has a base elevation of around 8,200 ft (2,500 m).

== Description ==
The bowl is a small cirque, about 0.5 miles (0.80 km) wide. It is formed by San Antonio Creek, which cascades down the south face of Mount San Antonio. It is dominated by a massive fell field, dotted by some isolated trees.

=== Features ===
- The cirque is traversed by the Baldy Bowl Trail, which leads to the summit of Mount San Antonio.
- Baldy Bowl is also home to the San Antonio Ski Hut, which was built in 1937 and owned by the Sierra Club. The ski hut is a popular location for picnics and other day-use activities, despite the strenuous hike required to reach it.

== Mountaineering ==
A technical climb of Mount San Antonio involves climbing up the face of Baldy Bowl. This is a straightforward ice climb during the winter, and a difficult scramble during the summer. Avalanches have been known to occur at Baldy Bowl.
