= Pine Mountain (San Bernardino County, California) =

Mountain in California, United States

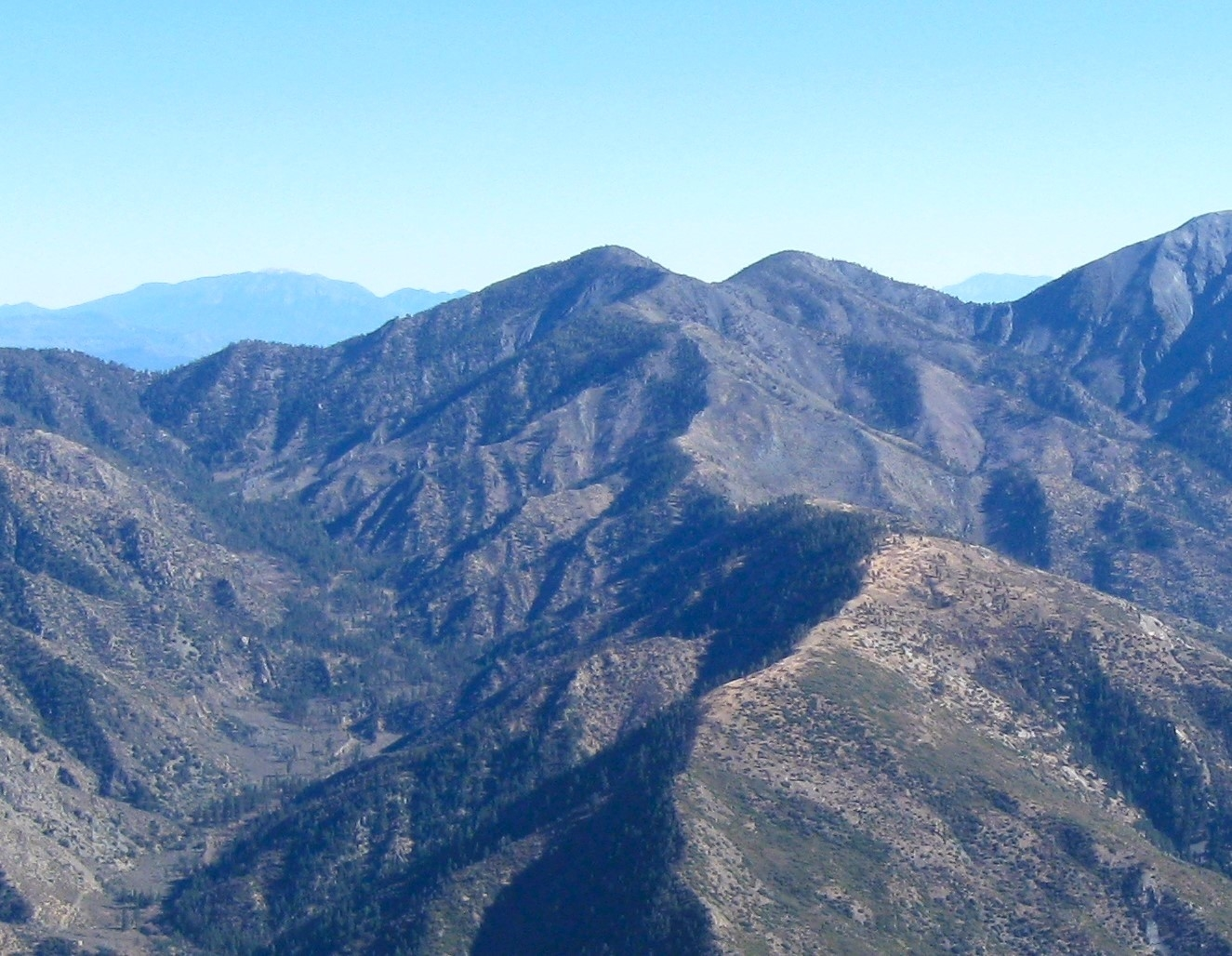
- Northwest aspect of Pine Mountain (center)

Highest point
- Elevation: 9,652 ft (2,942 m)
- Prominence: 862 ft (263 m)
- Parent peak: Mount San Antonio (10,064 ft)
- Isolation: 1.70 mi (2.74 km)
- Listing: Hundred Peaks Section
- Coordinates: 34°18′49″N 117°38′39″W

Geography
- Location within California Location within the United States
- Country: United States
- State: California
- County: San Bernardino
- Protected area: San Gabriel Mountains National Monument; Sheep Mountain Wilderness
- Parent range: San Gabriel Mountains
- Topo map: USGS Mount San Antonio

Geology
- Mountain type: Fault block

Climbing
- Easiest route: North Backbone Trail

Pine Mountain is a 9,652-foot-elevation (2,942-meter) summit located in the San Gabriel Mountains, in San Bernardino County, California, United States.

== Description ==
Pine Mountain is set approximately 40 miles (64 km) northeast of downtown Los Angeles within San Gabriel Mountains National Monument and the Sheep Mountain Wilderness. It ranks as the second-highest peak in the San Gabriel Mountains, second-highest in the wilderness and monument, and the 10th-highest in the county. Topographic relief is significant as the summit rises 2,650 feet (808 meters) above North Fork Lytle Creek in approximately one mile (1.6 km). Reaching the summit involves 6.5 miles of trail hiking with 1,600 feet of elevation gain. The mountain was named by the US Forest Service for the dense stand of Jeffrey Pine and white fir covering the slopes. This landform's toponym has been officially adopted by the U.S. Board on Geographic Names and first appeared in 1901.

== Climate ==
According to the Köppen climate classification system, Pine Mountain is located in a continental climate zone (Dsa) with mostly dry summers (except for scattered summer thunderstorms) and cold, wet winters. Most weather fronts originating in the Pacific Ocean travel east toward the San Gabriel Mountains. As fronts approach, they are forced upward by the peaks (orographic lift), causing them to drop their moisture onto the range. Precipitation runoff from this mountain's west slopes drains to the San Gabriel River and the east slope drains into Lytle Creek.

== Gallery ==
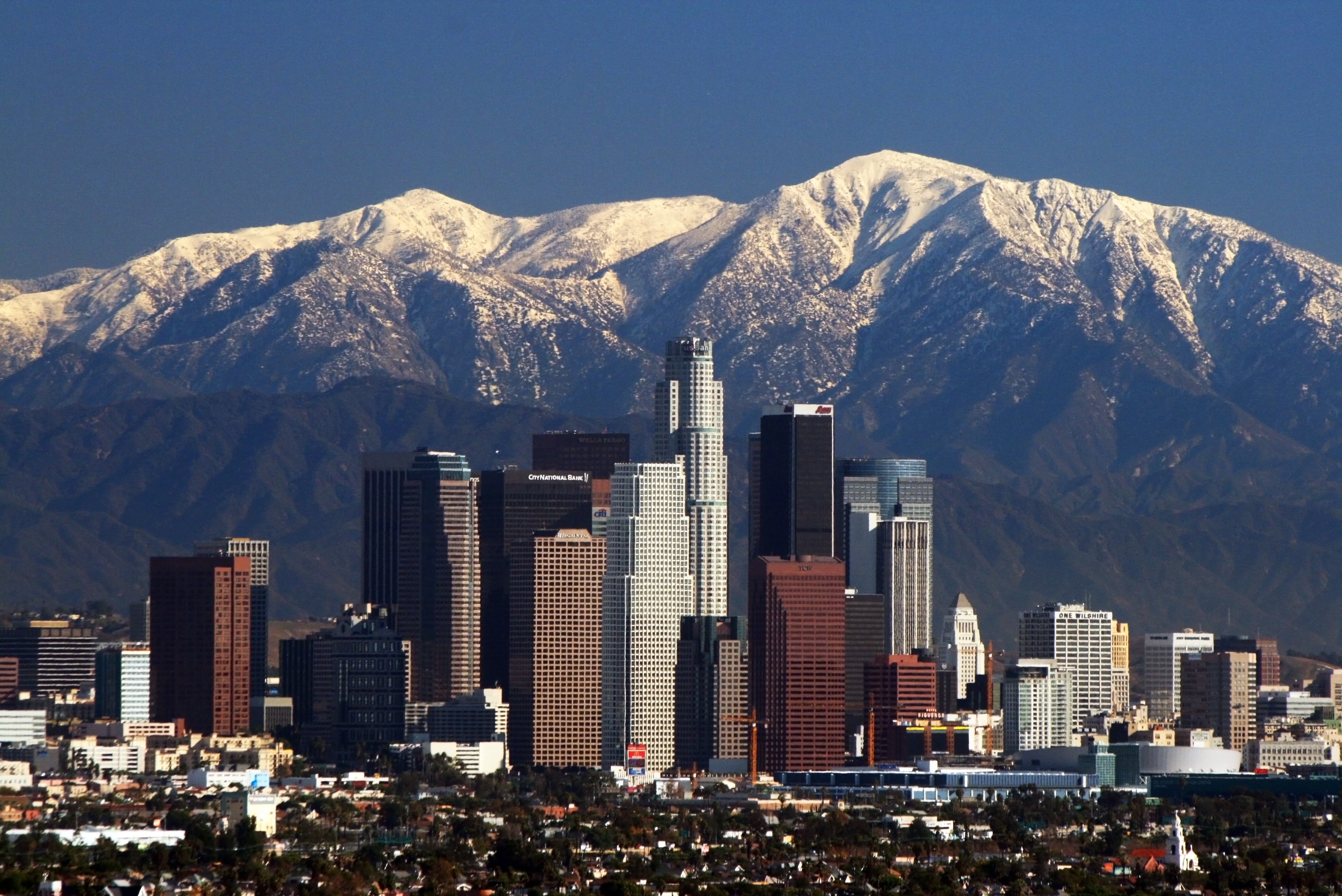
Los Angeles with Pine Mountain to left, Mount San Antonio (aka Baldy) to right

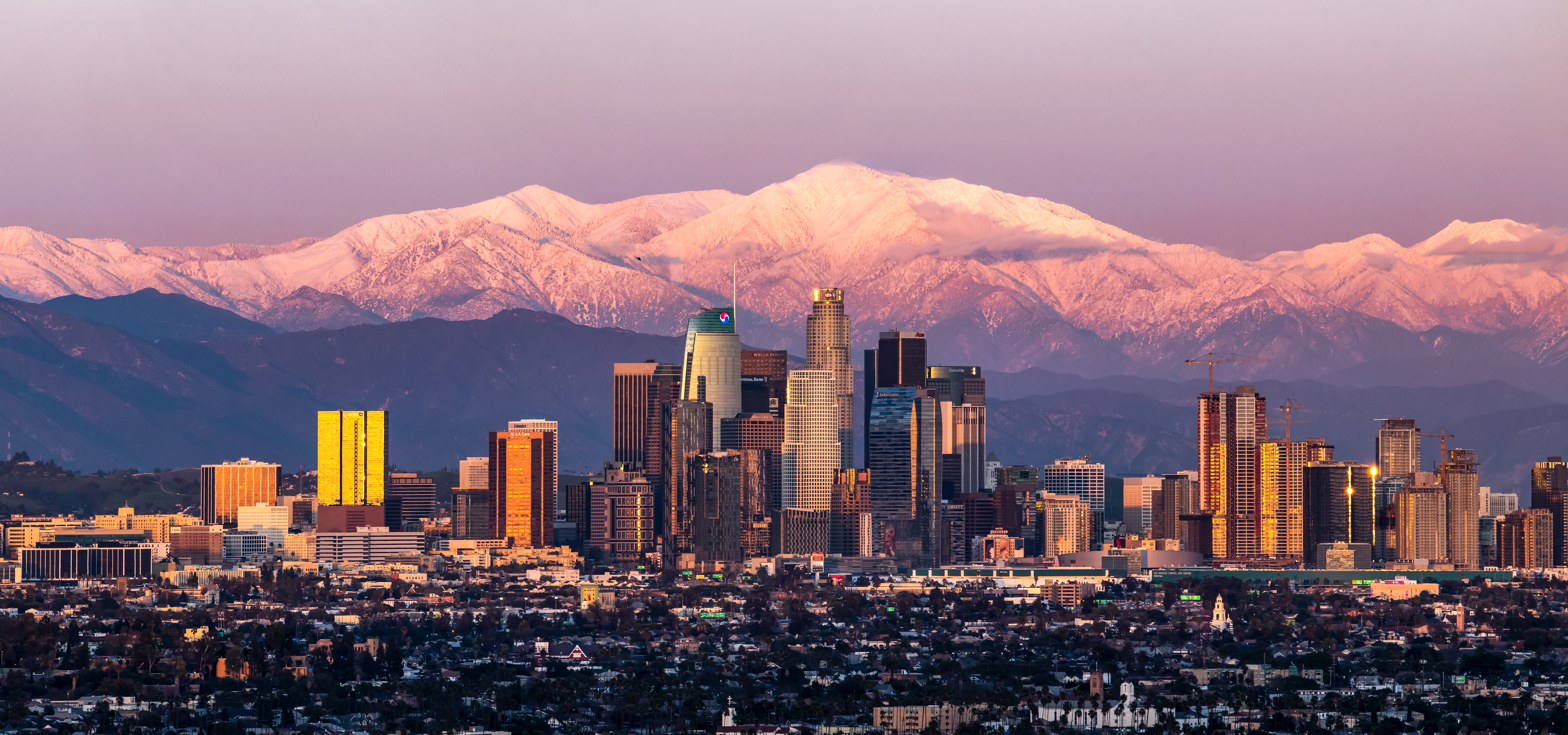
Los Angeles with Pine Mountain to left of center, Mount San Antonio center

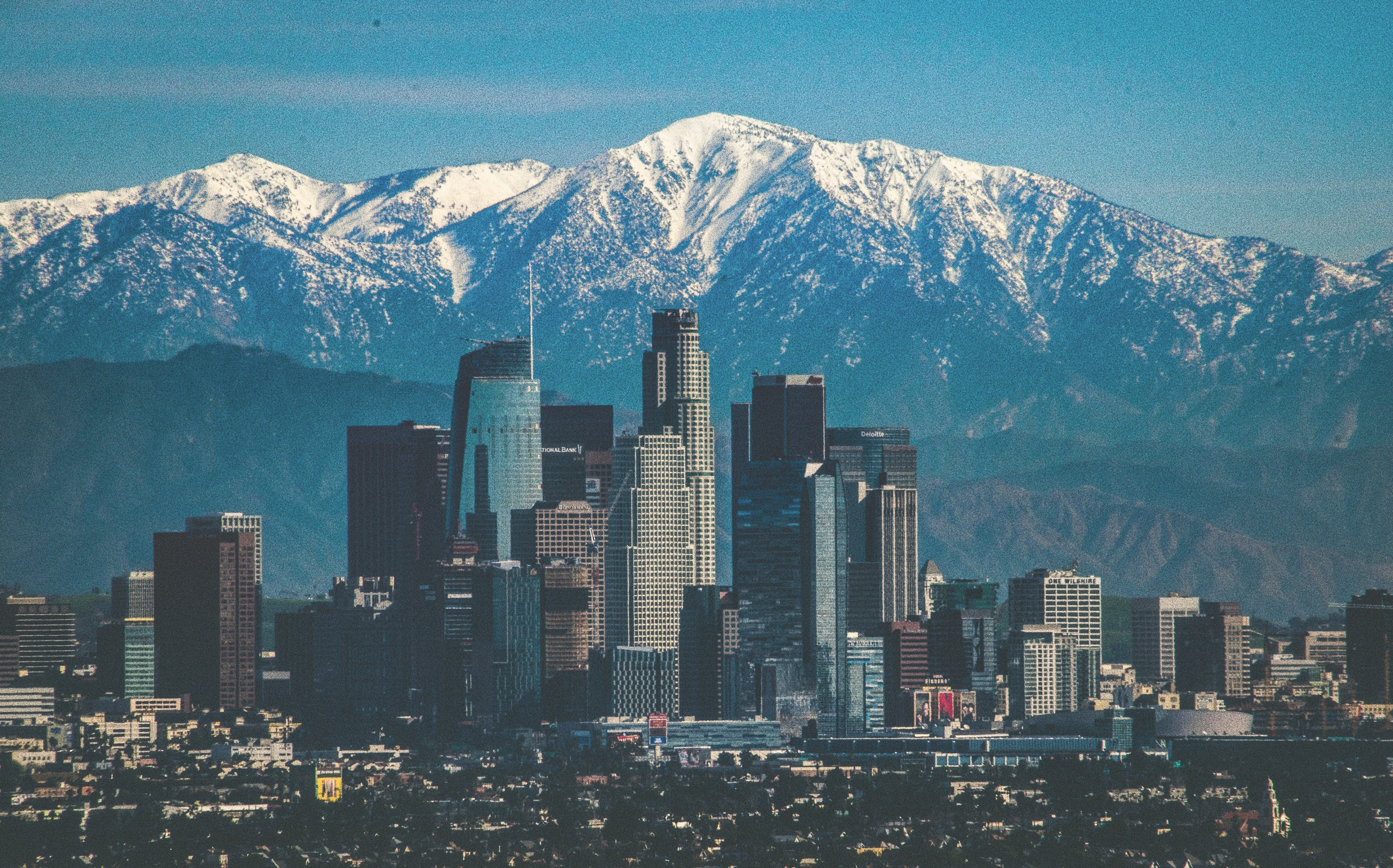
Los Angeles with Pine Mountain to left, Mount San Antonio (aka Baldy) center

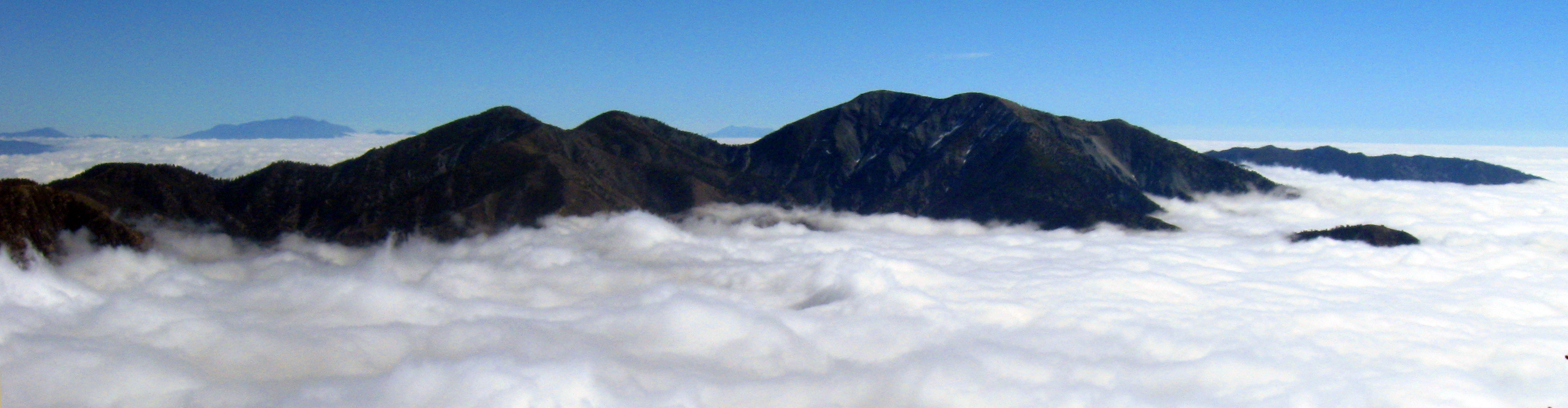
View from the summit of Mount Baden-Powell. Pine Mountain to left and Mount San Antonio (aka Baldy) to right.

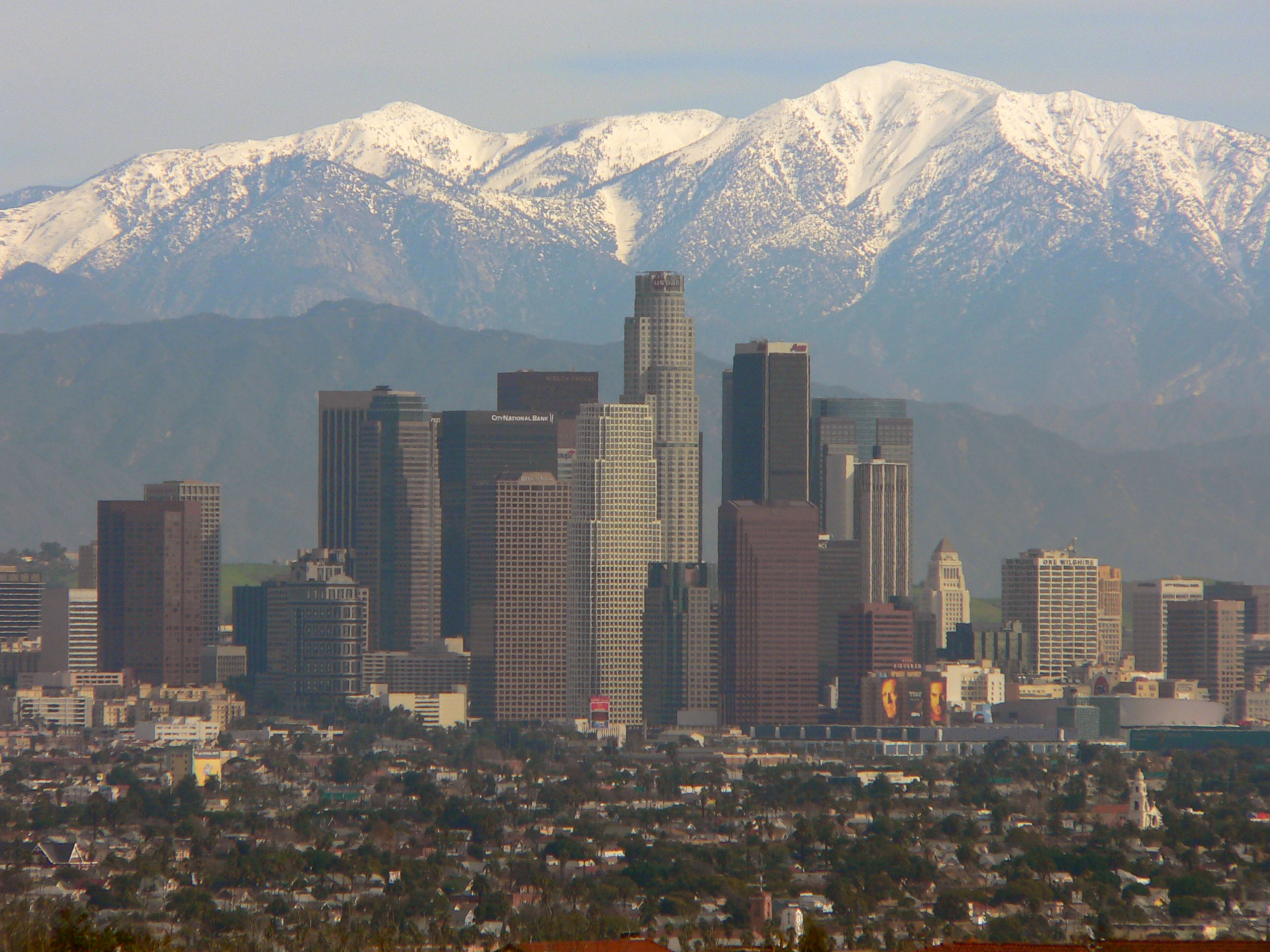
Los Angeles with Pine Mountain to left, Mount San Antonio (aka Baldy) to right
