= Aurelia Harwood =

American conservationist

Aurelia Squire Harwood
- Born: September 1865; Janesville, Wisconsin, US
- Died: June 1928 (aged 62); Los Angeles, California, US
- Occupation: Conservationist

Aurelia Squire Harwood (September 1865 – June 1928), daughter of the wealthy Harwood family of Ontario, California, was a conservationist, educator, and first female President of the Sierra Club in 1927 and 1928. In addition to her terms as President, she simultaneously sat on the Angeles Chapter's Executive Committee, and the club's Board of Directors, from 1921 to 1928.

Harwood had a great love of the outdoors that began during her childhood in Springfield, Missouri, where she moved with her family at an early age. Over the years, she became a member of the Green Mountain Club, the Mazamas, and the Mountaineers. When she settled in her final home of Ontario, California, she joined the Sierra Club, and led local outings there for fourteen years.

Another love of Harwood's was education. She attained a liberal arts undergraduate degree at Drury University, which her father Charles helped endow. Later, she completed graduate studies at Wellesley College. After her father's example, Aurelia too donated to help fund universities, contributing to Pomona College, and scholarships for Chinese students at Mills College.

Harwood died in 1928 and was buried at Bellevue Memorial Park in Ontario, California. The Angeles Chapter of the Sierra Club named their new lodge after her in 1930. The peak east of Mount San Antonio, Mount Harwood, was also named in her honor, and recognized by the USGS in 1965. Harwood Court at Pomona College, and her namesake scholarship at Mills College, still bear her family name.
