= Lookout Mountain (Los Angeles County, California) =

Geological feature in California, US

Coordinates: 34°14′55″N 117°40′34″W

Lookout Mountain in Los Angeles County, California, is a 6,812-foot (2,076 m) peak on the shoulder of Mount San Antonio ("Mount Baldy").

Albert A. Michelson used the peak to measure the speed of light in 1925–1929. For him to do so, the United States Coast and Geodetic Survey in 1923 established a 21.5-mile (34.6 km) baseline with an accuracy of 1 part in 11 million from Pasadena, California, at the base of Mount Baldy roughly to Rancho Cucamonga at the base of Mount Wilson. It may have been the most accurate baseline ever determined at the time. The Coast and Geodetic Survey then used the baseline to triangulate the distance to the Mount Wilson Observatory, with a distance error of about 1 part in 5 million, and Michelson measured light travel time between the stations with a rotating mirror apparatus. The concrete piers on Lookout Mountain used for the Michelson observations still exist.

The first fire lookout in the Angeles National Forest was built on Lookout Mountain in 1914 and stood until it burned in 1927.
