= Mount Baldy Ski Lifts =

Ski resort in Southern California

Mt Baldy Ski Lifts
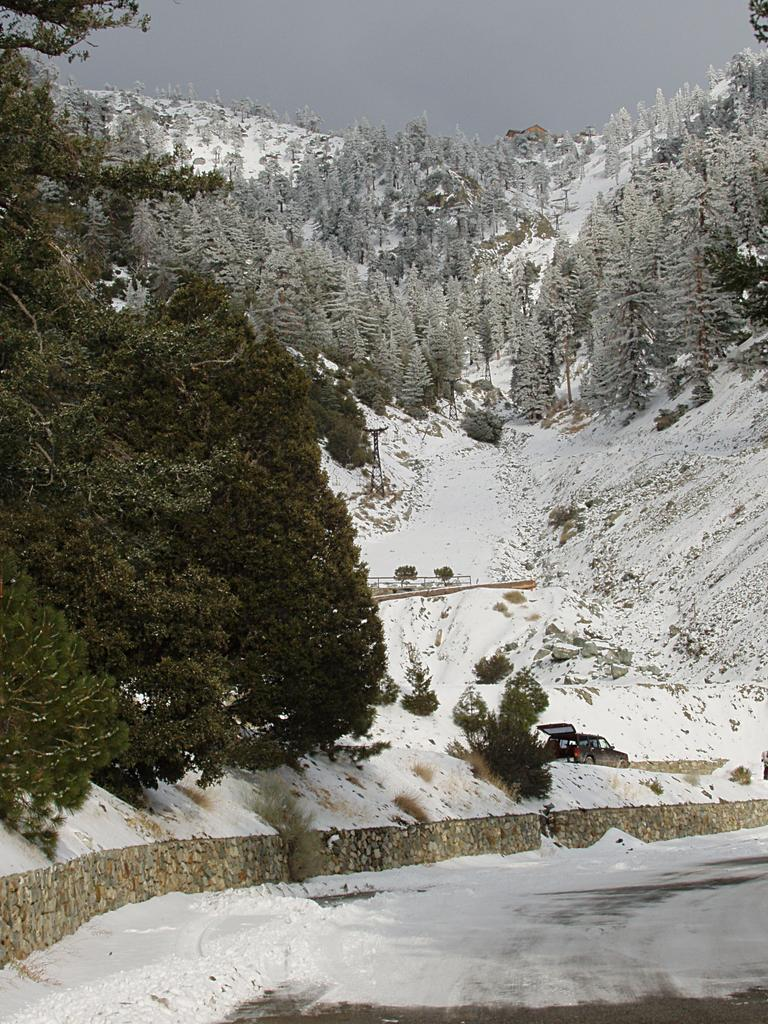
- January 2007

- Location in the United States Location in California
- Location: Mount San Antonio and Telegraph Peak, California, U.S.
- Nearest city: Mt. Baldy, Los Angeles - 45 mi (72 km)
- Coordinates: 34.27°N 117.62°W
- Vertical: 2,100 ft (640 m)
- Top elevation: 8,600 ft (2,620 m)
- Base elevation: 6,500 ft (1,980 m)
- Skiable area: 800 acres (3.2 km^{2})
- Trails: 26 total 15% beginner 31% intermediate 54% advanced
- Longest run: 2.5 miles (4.0 km)
- Lift system: 4 chairlifts
- Snowfall: 170 in (14 ft; 430 cm)
- Snowmaking: Yes
- Night skiing: None
- Website: mtbaldyresort.com

The Mount Baldy Ski Lifts, or "Baldy", is a ski resort in the western United States in southern California. Forty-five miles (72 km) east-northeast of Los Angeles in San Bernardino County, it is located on Mount San Antonio—Mount Baldy in the San Gabriel Mountains.

== History ==
The vintage ski lifts were installed in 1952 by Harwood Developments. They were operated as Mt Baldy Ski Lifts Inc. and were managed by Herbert Leffler from 1953 until his retirement in 1969. The resort was sold to an investment group in 1969.

In 1987, Bob Olson proposed a project to make Baldy "The Disneyland of the Mountains."

== Gallery ==
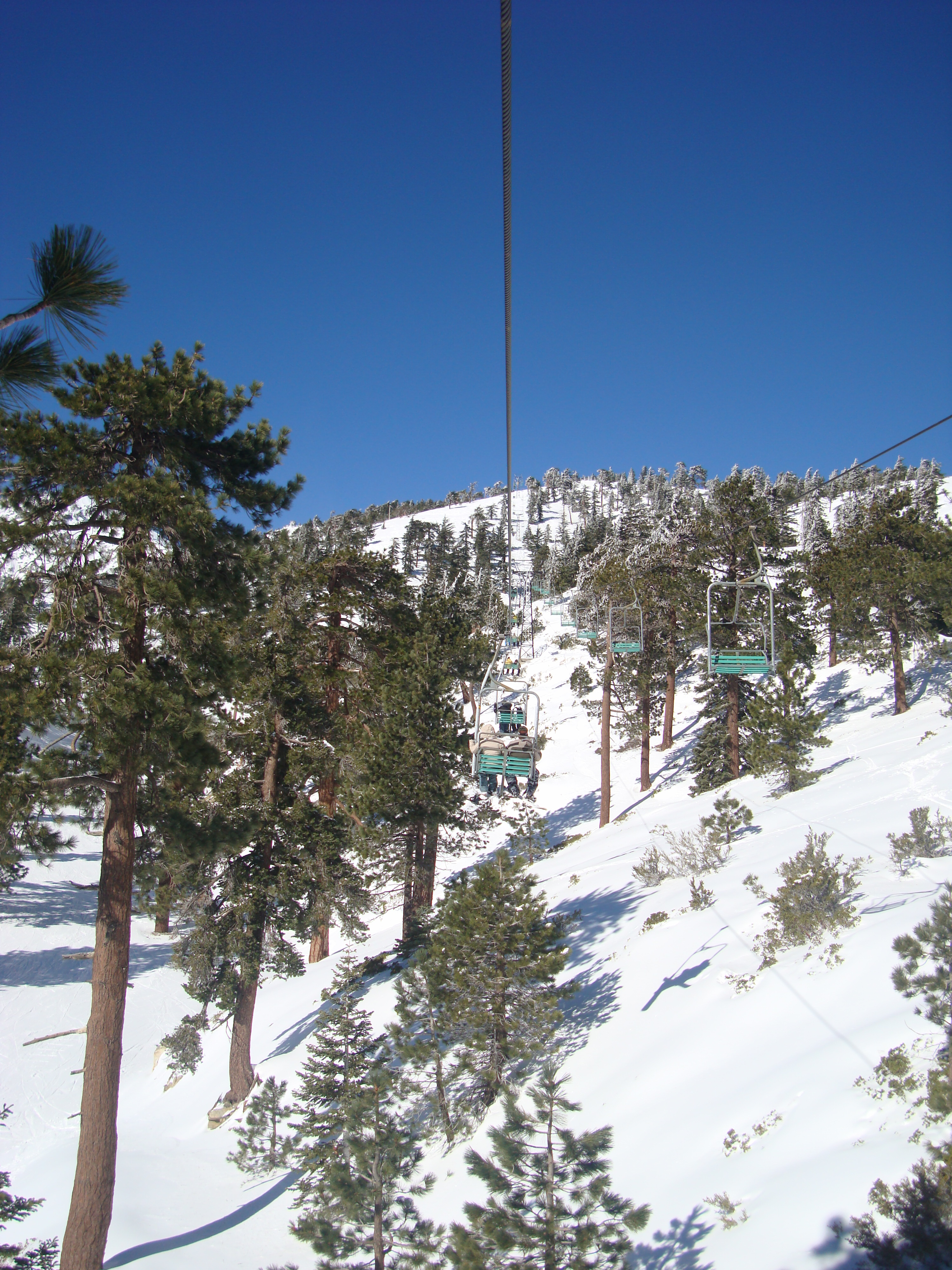
Chair #4 at Mt. Baldy

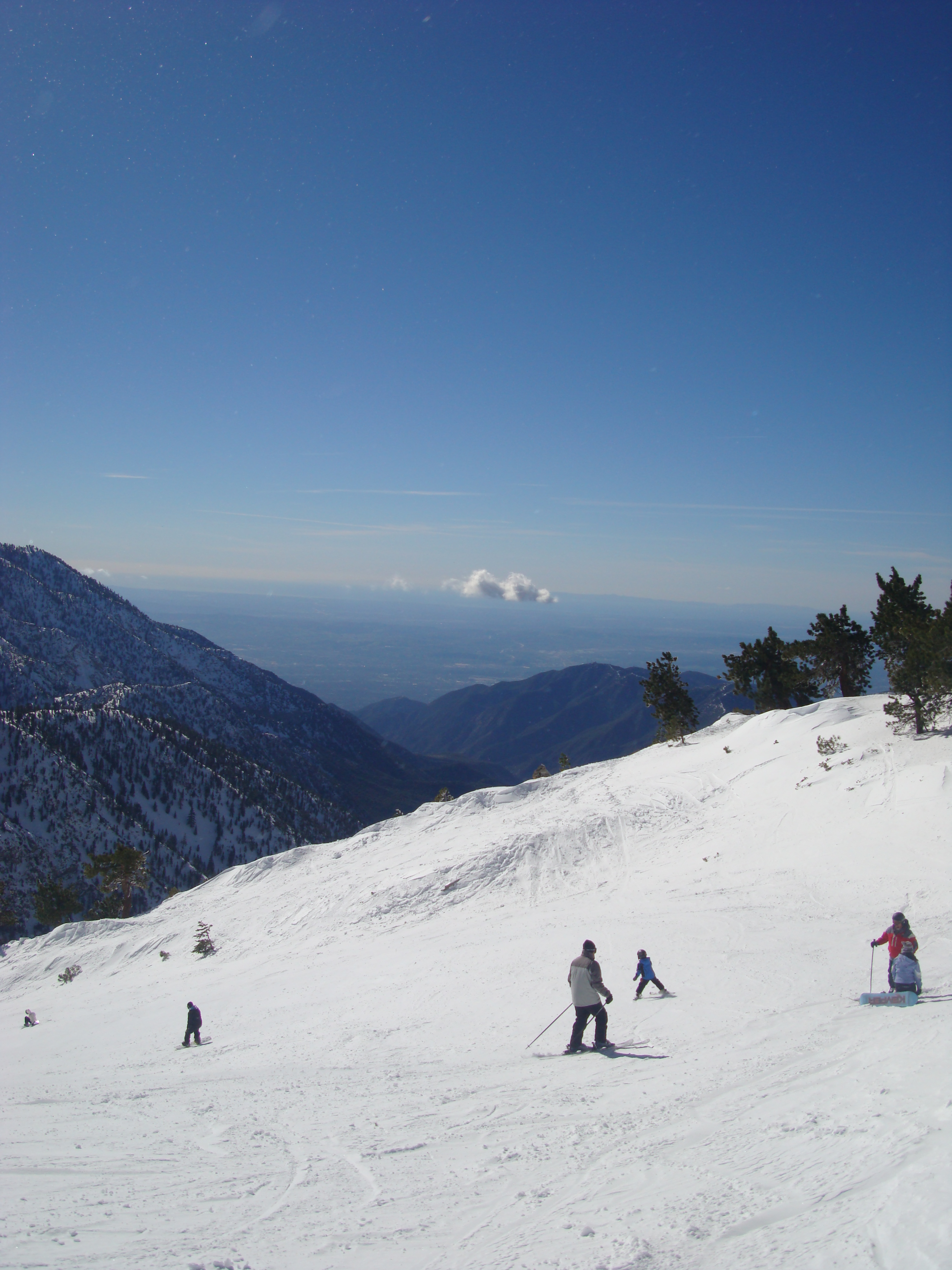
Skiing overlooking Los Angeles

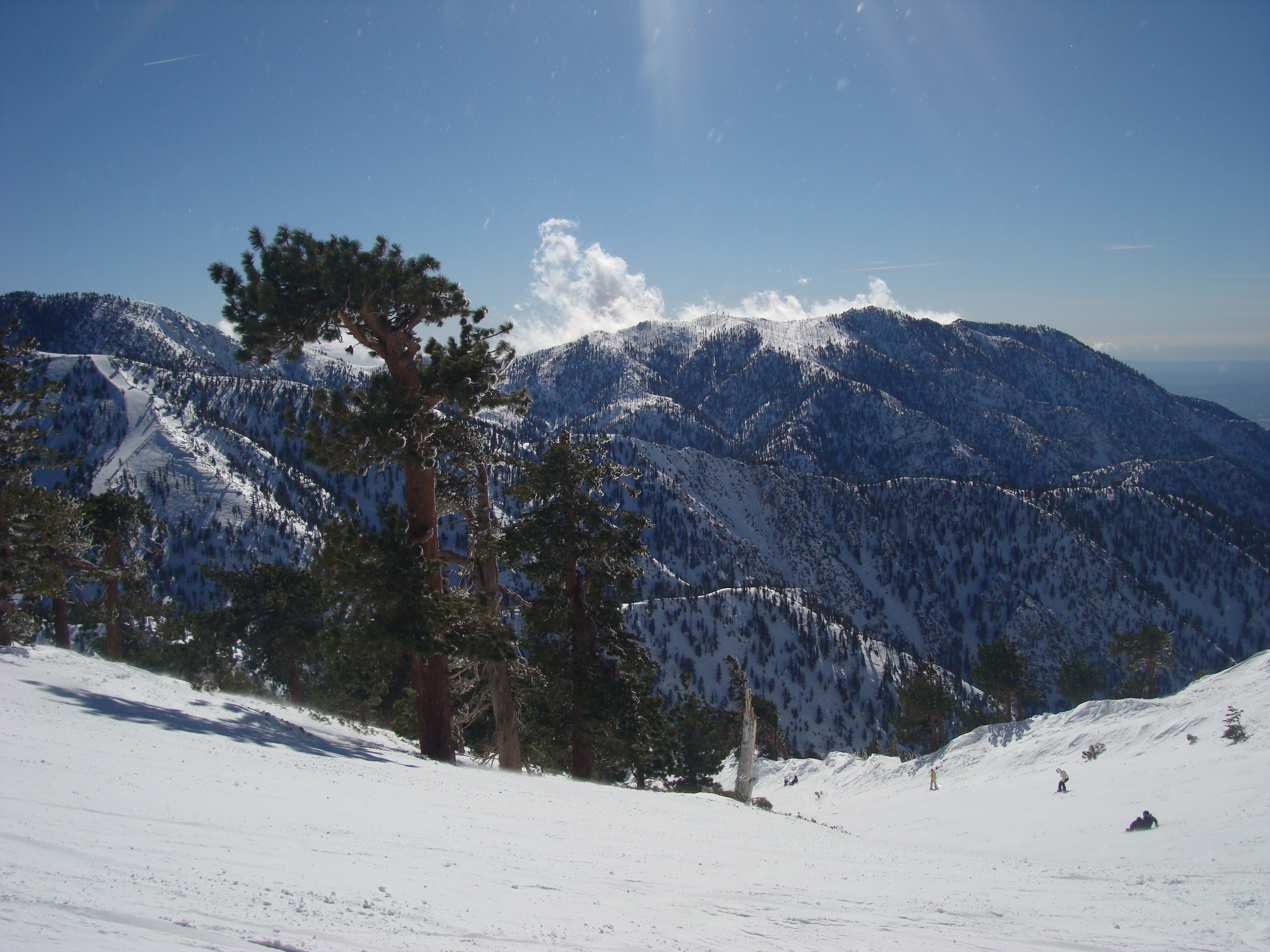
Skiing at Mt. Baldy

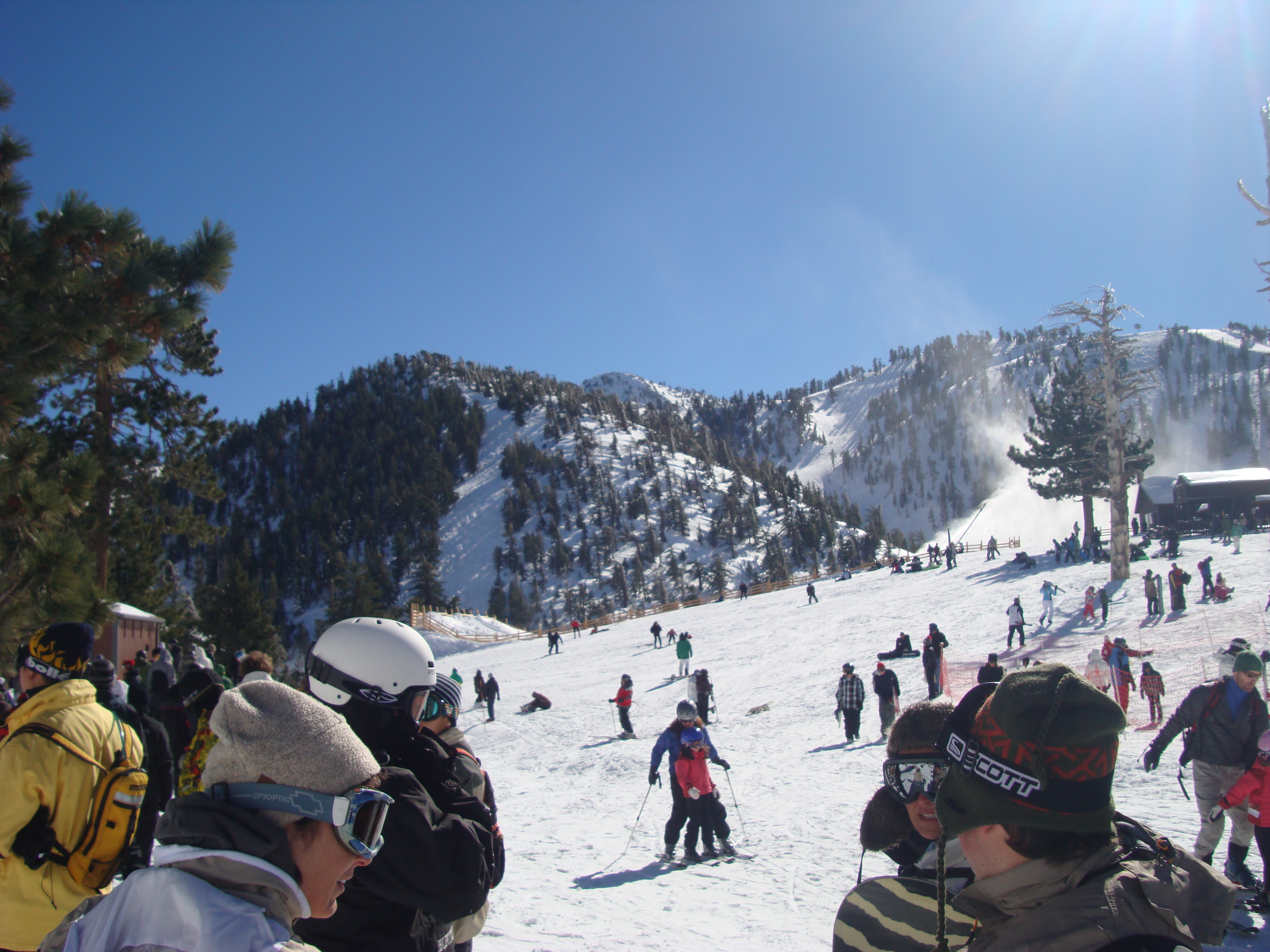
Skiers at Mt. Baldy

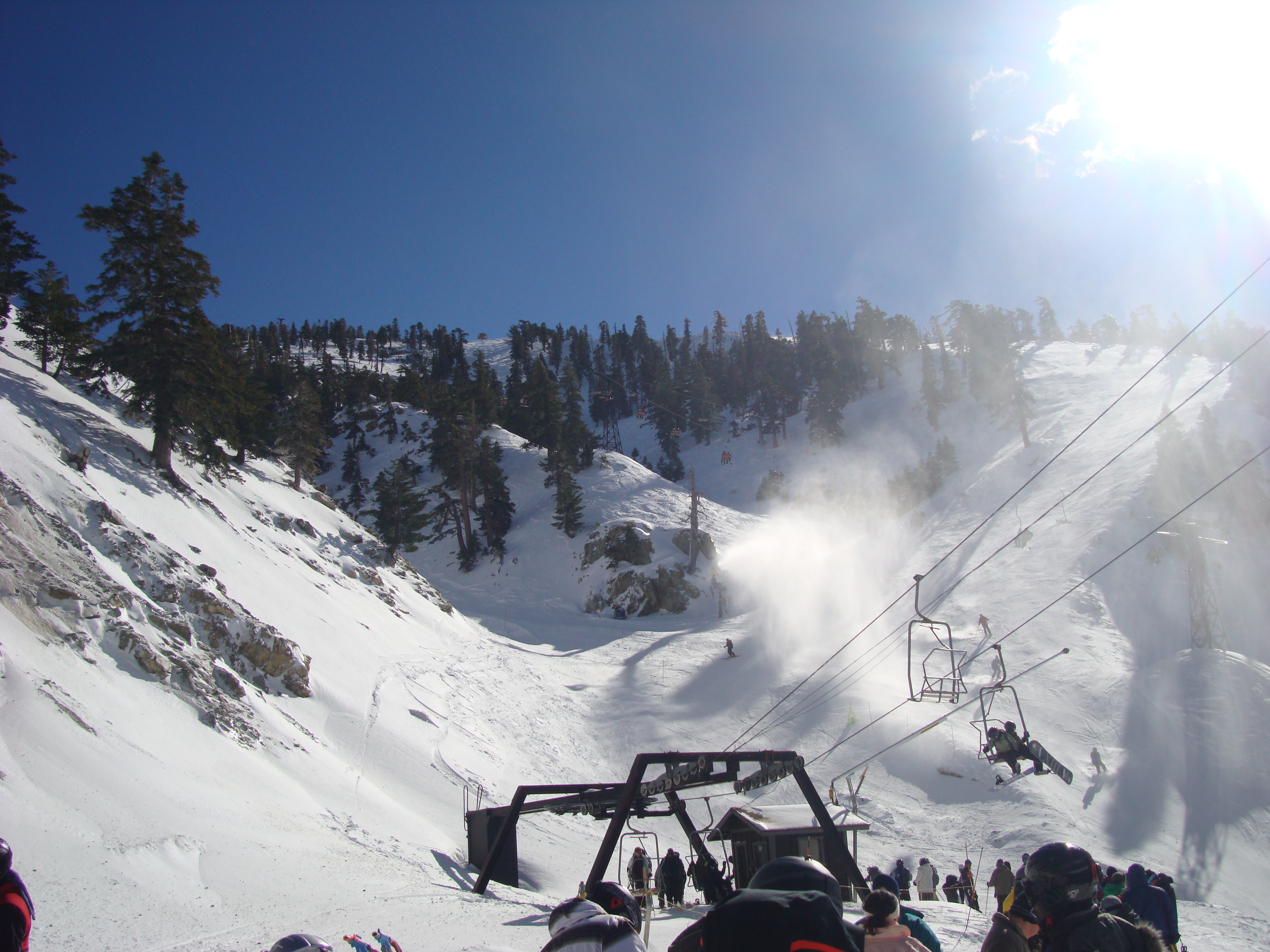
The base of Chair #2 at Mt. Baldy with Thunder Mountain in the background
