= Oreonana clementis =

Scientific classification
- Kingdom: Plantae
- Clade: Tracheophytes
- Clade: Angiosperms
- Clade: Eudicots
- Clade: Asterids
- Order: Apiales
- Family: Apiaceae
- Genus: Oreonana
- Species: O. clementis

Binomial name
- Oreonana clementis (M.E.Jones) Jeps.

Species of flowering plant

Oreonana clementis, the pygmy mountainparsley, is a perennial plant in the carrot family (Apiaceae) that grows in the United States Sierra Nevada mountain range.

== Habitat and range ==
It can be found in the Sierra Nevada from 5,500 to 13,000 feet (1,700 to 4,000 m), in dry, granitic gravels.

== Description ==
A tuft of 1 inch (2.5 cm), gray, hairy leaves are attached directly to the root, with no stems.

Balls of whitish flower clusters on short stems occur from May to August.
