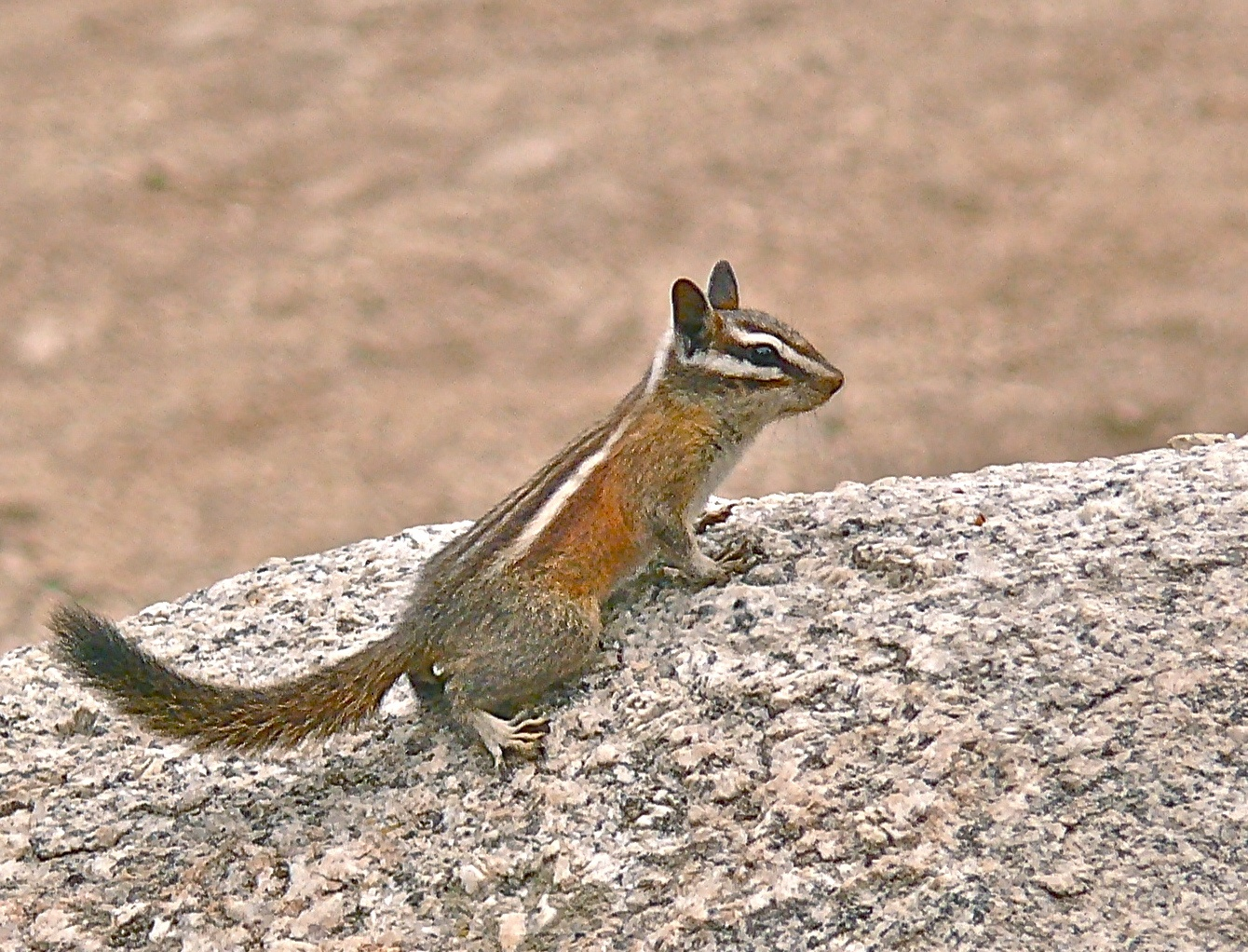

Conservation status
- Least Concern (IUCN 3.1)

Scientific classification
- Kingdom: Animalia
- Phylum: Chordata
- Class: Mammalia
- Order: Rodentia
- Family: Sciuridae
- Genus: Neotamias
- Species: N. speciosus

Binomial name
- Neotamias speciosus (Merriam, 1890)

Synonyms
- Tamias speciosus Merriam, 1890

= Lodgepole chipmunk =

Species of rodent

The Lodgepole chipmunk (Neotamias speciosus) is a species of rodent in the family Sciuridae. It is found in the U.S. state of California at elevations from 1,500 to 3,000 metres (4,900 to 9,800 ft). The Lodgepole chipmunk has a variety of common names including: Tahoe chipmunk, Sequoia chipmunk, Mt. Pinos chipmunk, and San Bernardino chipmunk.

== Description ==
Females are larger than males. Female Lodgepole chipmunks have an average body weight of 55-69 grams whereas males on average are 50-60 grams. Along with weight, body length in females ranges 197–229 mm (7.8–9.0 in), while males are 200–222 mm (7.9–8.7 in). Body patterns remain consistent in both sexes as they exhibit characteristic white dorsal and facial stripes, where the central dorsal stripes are less prominent and closer to yellow-white than the lateral white stripes. In comparison to other close relatives, this species has darker and broader facial stripes. Other notable body patterns include dark black dorsal stripes, a lack of a black stripe underneath the prominent white lateral stripe, bright orange color on sides and orange-gray coloring on the shoulders, a gray under-belly, and a gray rump. The top of the head, the crown, is known to be brown with some gray interspersed. The tail, lengthier in females, ranges from 13–22 mm (0.51–0.87 in) and is characterized by its black tip and cinnamon body.

== Distribution and habitat ==
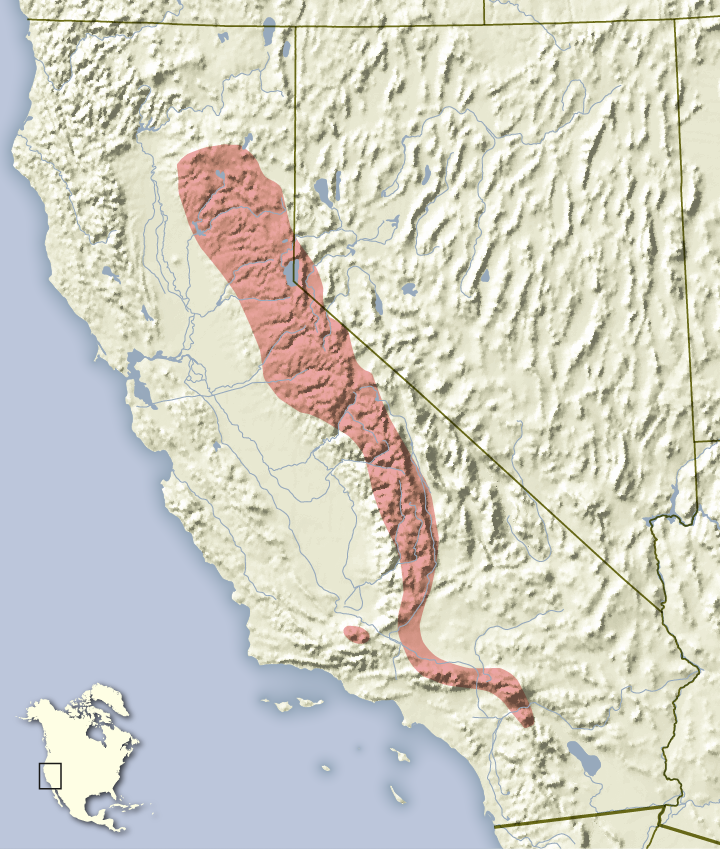
Range Map of the Lodgepole chipmunk

The Lodgepole chipmunk spans from the high Sierra Nevada, San Jacinto, San Bernardino, and San Gabriel Mountain ranges of California into the Lake Tahoe region of the west central corner of Nevada. This species lives in subalpine coniferous forests made primarily of several species of pines (Lodgepole, Jeffrey, Ponderosa, and Sugar) and firs (Douglas, white and red). They can be observed foraging around and on top of rocks and fallen logs, which make up the forest floor.

In 1978, a removal experiment based on observations was conducted by Mark A. Chappell which took four different species of chipmunk into account. This experiment was to detail the process of removal by the different species. In the experiment, it was noted that the four different species were allopatric, meaning they formed non-overlapping borders in their Sierra Nevada habitat. Each species (N. alpinus, N. speciosus, N. amoenus, and N. minimus) was noted to live at different zones in the Sierra Nevada. The Lodgepole chipmunk (N. speciosus) was observed living from 2400 to 3000 meters in the lodgepole pine zone, between the alpine zone (3000+ meters) and the Piñon pine/mountain mahogany zone (1900–2400 meters). This ecological competition for different zones of a single area is determined by physiological and environmental limits, where each species is limited specifically to a zone that best fit each species' habitat preferences.

The effects of burning and mechanical thinning were investigated from 1999 to 2000 and 2002–2003 in the southern Sierra Nevada Mountains. This experiment was conducted through captures of Lodgepole chipmunks and the results indicated that over a short-term period, forest management techniques such as burning and mechanical thinning did not have a significant impact on the species in respect to capture rate or population number. However, the experiment did indicate that body mass of these chipmunks decreased because forest structure changed, limiting food availability provided by the cones of trees.

== Predators ==
Natural predators of this chipmunk include coyotes, foxes (primarily the gray fox), hawks (Cooper's and red-tailed), bobcats, and martens. To avoid such threats, the Lodgepole chipmunk is capable of climbing trees in order to seek safety and also minimize open exposure by utilizing the color patterns and markings of its fur to blend into its surroundings, providing camouflage against the environment.

== Behavior and communication ==
Several different vocalizations are used by the Lodgepole chipmunk during both courtship and when frightened by a predator. During courtship, visual displays can be shown through the action of tail flipping and body postures of both sexes. Alongside visual displays, during courtship males and females utilize chips and whistles. When frightened or alerting others, the Lodgepole chipmunk produces a high pitched "whisk", a shrill "tsew", as well as the series "pst-pst-pst-a-ku" in a rapid and repeated manner. After caching food throughout the spring and summer months, hibernation begins at the end of October and lasts until early to mid April, a five-six month span.

=== Gestation ===
The period of gestation for a Lodgepole chipmunk lasts about one month. They often give birth to one litter each year, averaging 3-6 offspring, typically in July. During birth, the mother will usually go to an underground den near a large log or stone to give birth to its offspring. They may also use abandoned holes dug by Woodpeckers.

== Diet and ecological role ==
The Lodgepole chipmunk is an omnivore, feeding on both animal (mammals, birds, bird eggs, small invertebrates arthropods, and insects) and plant matter (leaves, flowers, pollen, fungi, and seeds). Like most rodents, this chipmunk engages in the foraging behavior of caching and storing food in order to survive the long winter hibernation. Through its diet, this chipmunk ingests seeds, which may not be completely broken down through the digestive process, and then defecated and dispersed throughout its habitat. Similarly, the Lodgepole chipmunk also disperses ectomycorrhizal fungi. This kind of fungi is important to forests, allowing for trees to subsist by increasing their water and nutrient gains. By dispersing spores, seeds, and pollen, the Lodgepole chipmunk plays an important role in the maintenance of the forest and mountain ecosystem.

== Reproduction ==
Through visual displays and vocalizations, both males and females engage in courtship. When the scrotum turns black and the testes are loosely relaxed, the male is ready to mate. Once per year Lodgepole chipmunks breed during May to early June, three to six young (pups) are born in early June after a one-month gestation period. Lactation provided by the mother allows nourishment to poorly developed pups, lasting for approximately one month, and then the young are independent by Fall. Young reach sexual maturity the following spring. Though not known, it is expected that like other relatives, the Lodgepole chipmunk exhibit a polygynous system of mating. Also, parental investment rests solely on the mother as the father of the litter does not provide parental care to his offspring.
