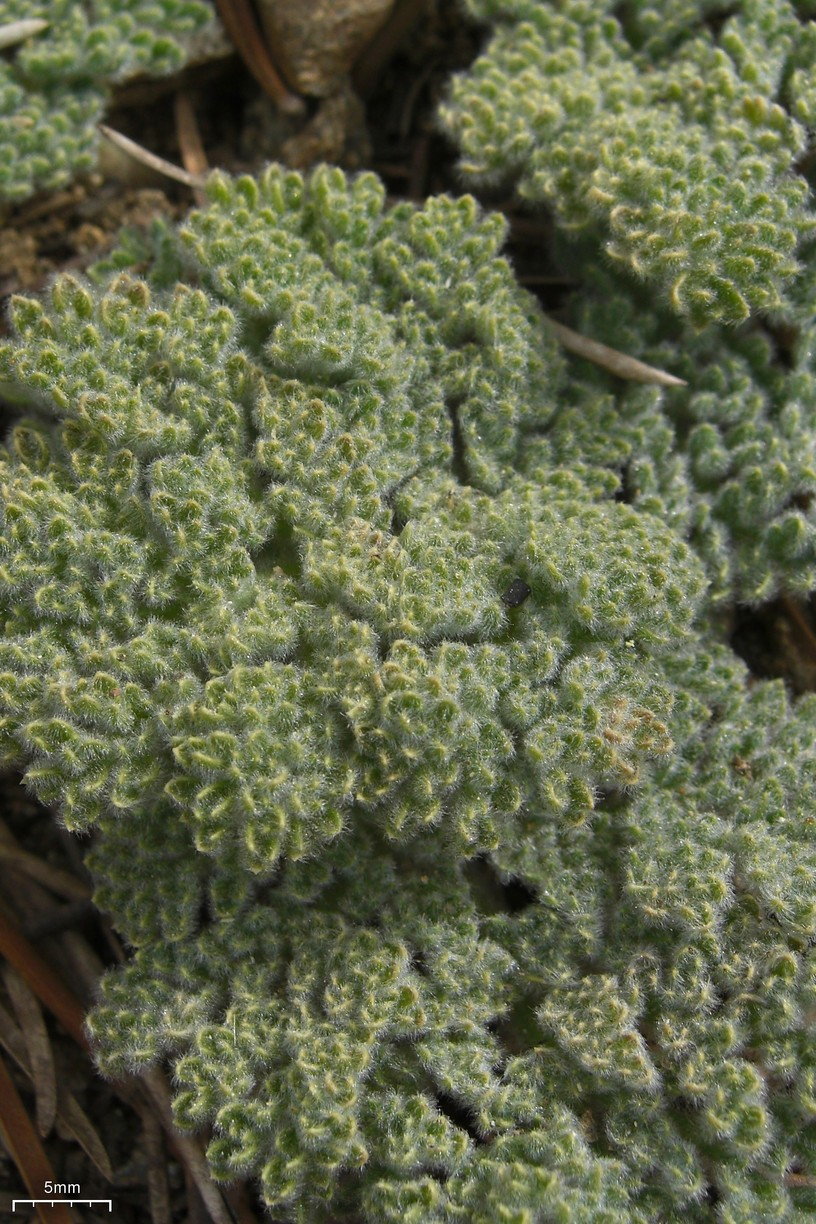
- Oreonana vestita

Scientific classification
- Kingdom: Plantae
- Clade: Tracheophytes
- Clade: Angiosperms
- Clade: Eudicots
- Clade: Asterids
- Order: Apiales
- Family: Apiaceae
- Subfamily: Apioideae
- Tribe: Selineae
- Genus: Oreonana; Jeps.

Species
- 3 - see text.

= Oreonana =

Genus of flowering plants

Oreonana is a small genus of flowering plants in the carrot family known generally as mountainparsleys. All three species are endemic to high mountain ranges in California. They are petite, cushionlike mat-forming perennial herbs.

As of December 2022, the Germplasm Resources Information Network considered that it may be a synonym of Cymopterus.

Species:

- Oreonana clementis - pygmy mountainparsley
- Oreonana purpurascens - purple mountainparsley
- Oreonana vestita - woolly mounainparsley
