= Cucamonga (disambiguation) =

Cucamonga is a name for the city of Rancho Cucamonga, California.

Cucamonga may also refer to:

- Cucamonga (album), a compilation involving Frank Zappa and Paul Buff
- Cucamonga Peak, in the San Gabriel Mountains
- Cucamonga Valley, a region of the Pomona Valley and San Bernardino Valley
- Cucamonga Valley AVA, a wine-growing region
- Cucamonga Wilderness, an area in the eastern San Gabriel Mountains
- Cucamonga Winery, a business from 1933 to 1975
- Rancho Cucamonga, an 1839 Mexican land grant

== See also ==
- Cucamonga Junction, Arizona, an evacuated mining settlement in the Kaibab National Forest
