= Timber Mountain =

Timber Mountain may refer to:

- Timber Mountain (San Bernardino County, California), a mountain in San Bernardino County in California
- Timber Mountain Log Ride, a log flume ride at Knott's Berry Farm in Southern California

== See also ==
- Timber Peak, Victoria Land, Antarctica
