= Long Beach Airport =

Domestic airport in Long Beach, California

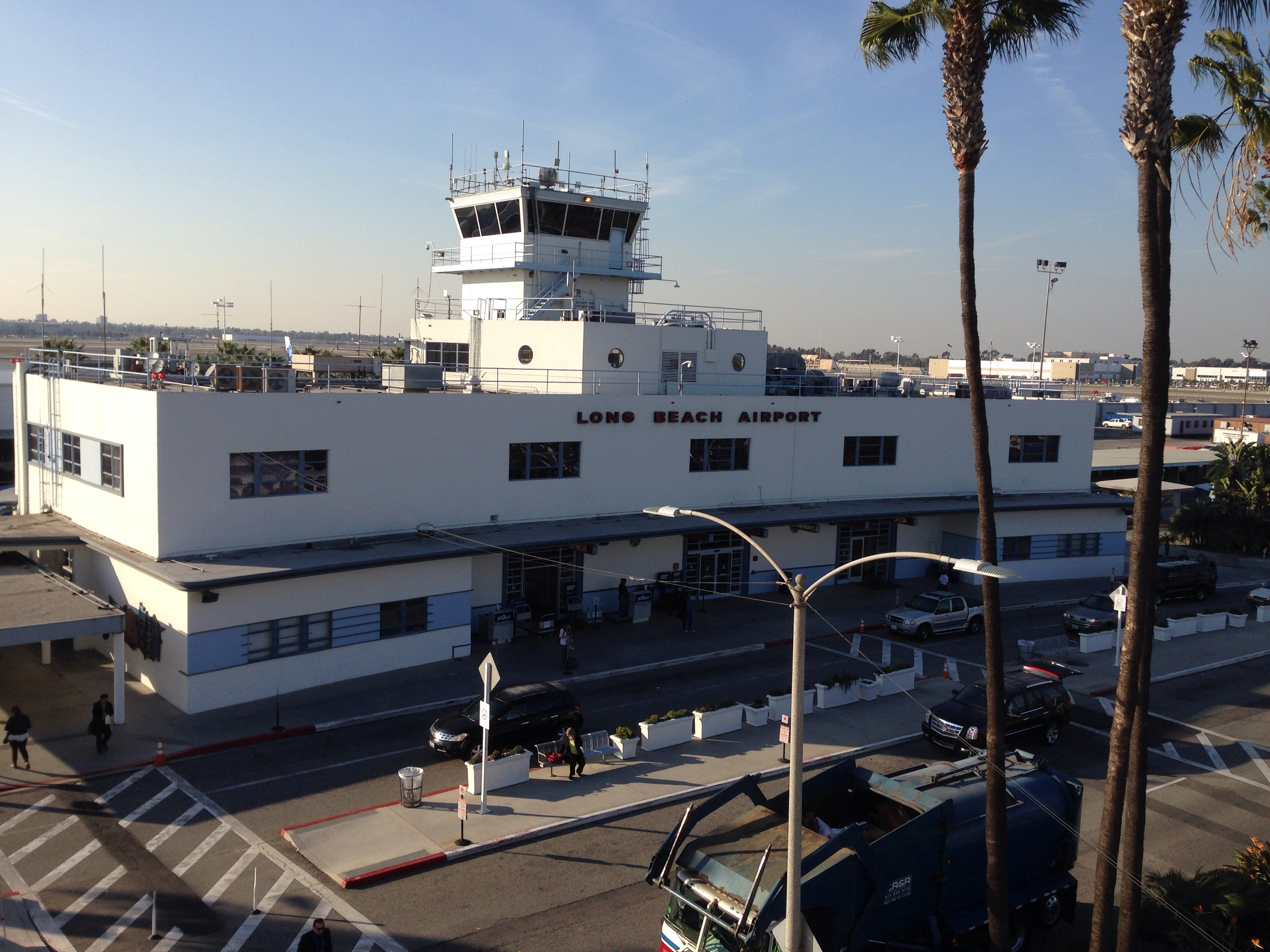
- IATA: LGB; ICAO: KLGB; FAA LID: LGB; WMO: 72297

Summary
- Airport type: Public
- Owner: City of Long Beach
- Serves: Greater Los Angeles
- Location: Long Beach, California, U.S.
- Elevation AMSL: 60 ft (18 m)
- Coordinates: 33°49′04″N 118°09′06″W
- Website: www.lgb.org

Maps
- FAA airport diagram
- Location within the Los Angeles metropolitan area Location within California Location within the United States
- Interactive map of Long Beach Airport

Runways
Direction	Length		Surface
Direction	ft	m	Surface
12/30	10,000	3,048	Asphalt concrete
08L/26R	6,192	1,887	Asphalt
08R/26L	3,918	1,194	Asphalt

Helipads
Number	Length		Surface
Number	ft	m	Surface
H2	20	6	Asphalt concrete
H3	300	91	Asphalt concrete
H4	20	6	Asphalt concrete
H5	20	6	Asphalt concrete

Statistics (2025)
- Total passengers: 3,818,155 ▼8.0%
- Aircraft operations (2024): 389,532
- Sources: FAA

Long Beach Airport (IATA: LGB, ICAO: KLGB, FAA LID: LGB) is a public airport 3 mi (4.8 km) northeast of downtown Long Beach, in Los Angeles County, California, United States. It is also called Daugherty Field, named after local aviator Earl Daugherty. The airport was an operating base for JetBlue, but this ended on October 6, 2020, as the carrier moved its operating base to Los Angeles International Airport (LAX), amidst the then-ongoing COVID-19 pandemic. Consequently, Southwest Airlines became the airport's largest airline.

The National Plan of Integrated Airport Systems for 2011–2015 categorized it as a primary commercial service airport. Federal Aviation Administration records say the airport had 1,413,251 passenger boardings in calendar year 2008, 1,401,903 in 2009 and 1,451,404 in 2010.

== Overview ==
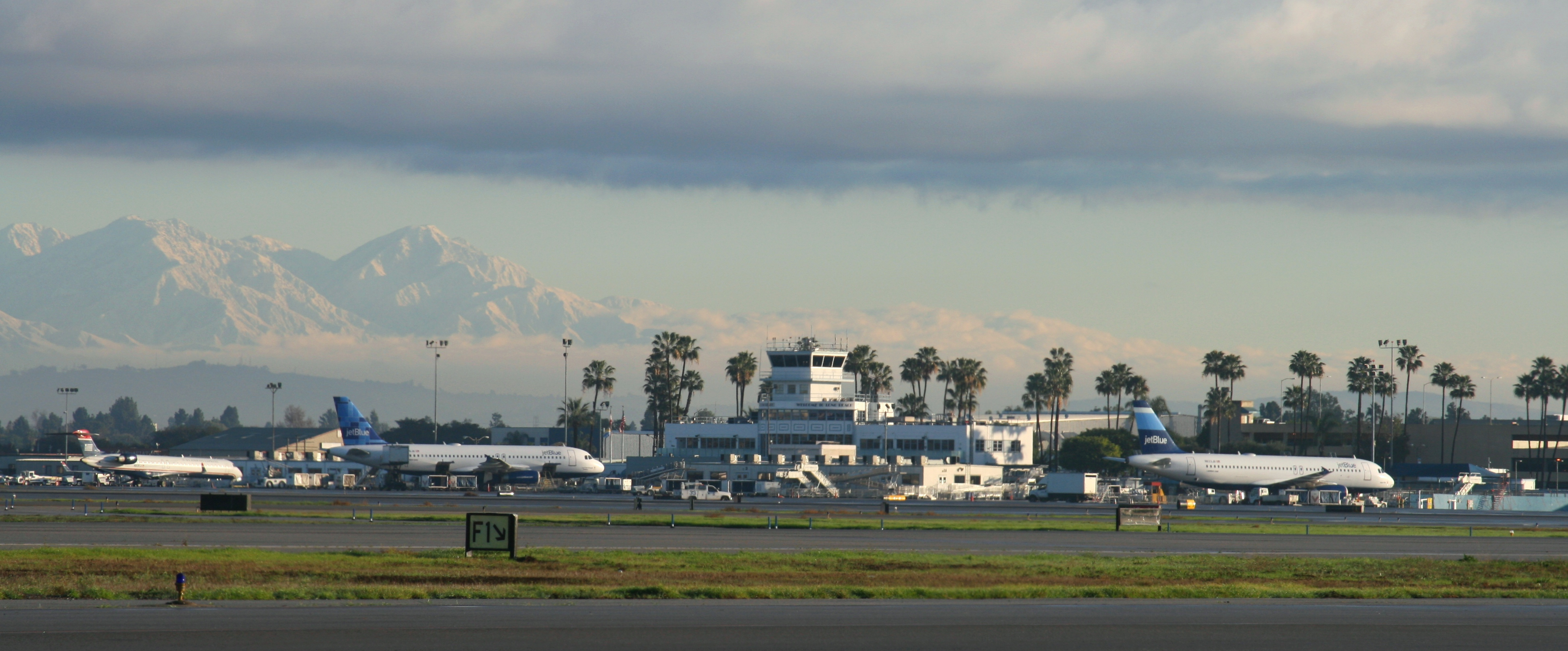
Long Beach Airport with Mount San Antonio and Timber Mountain in the background

Located near the border between Los Angeles County and Orange County, Long Beach Airport serves the Los Angeles MSA. Due to its close proximity to the busier and larger LAX 20 miles away, the airport sees more domestic commercial passenger, cargo, military, and general aviation activity. The airport's placement near many residential areas has led to it having one of the country's strictest ordinances limiting airport noise.

It is the 10th busiest airport in California based on passenger boardings, at 1.4 million. As of May 2025, Southwest operated the most airline flights out of Long Beach; the other airlines are Delta and Hawaiian. Air cargo carriers, including FedEx and UPS, also use LGB. 57,000 tons of goods are carried each year.

The Boeing Company (formerly McDonnell Douglas) maintains maintenance facilities for Boeing and McDonnell Douglas/Douglas aircraft (including the historic DC-9 and DC-10 aircraft) near the Long Beach Airport and produced the C-17 through 2015. The plants were leased to Mercedes-Benz and Relativity Space. Virgin Galactic established the satellite launch vehicles at the Long Beach Airport and operated by Virgin Orbit. Gulfstream Aerospace operates a completion/service center.

The Long Beach Airport has an aggressive noise abatement program, with three full-time noise specialists. The City of Long Beach can criminally prosecute the aircraft's owner and the pilots for breaking the noise ordinance. As the airport continues to grow and air traffic increases, so do the complaints about loud and low-flying aircraft. The airport produces a monthly noise and complaint report.

Because of the noise abatement program, commercial (passenger or cargo) flights have been restricted since 1981, when a limit of 15 daily flights was instituted. As of 2023, 41 daily flights are permanent, and 17 flights are supplemental (which are adjusted each year depending on noise budget results), for a total limit of 58 flights per day. However, many other types of flights take place, including charters, private aviation, flight schools, law enforcement flights, helicopters, advertising blimps, and planes that tow advertising banners. Long Beach airport is one of the busiest general aviation airports in the world, with 398,433 aircraft movements in 2007.

Long Beach Airport has one terminal in Streamline Moderne style that is a historical landmark and was renovated in early 2013.

ATP Flight School operates a professional commercial pilot flight training program at Long Beach Airport/Daugherty Field.

== History ==
The first transcontinental flight, a biplane flown by Calbraith Perry Rodgers, landed in 1911 on Long Beach's sandy beach. From 1911 until the airport was created, planes used the beach as a runway.

Barnstormer Earl S. Daugherty had leased the area that later became the airport for air shows, stunt flying, wing walking and passenger rides. Later, he started the world's first flight school in 1919 at the same location. In 1923 Daugherty convinced the city council to use the site to create the first municipal airport.

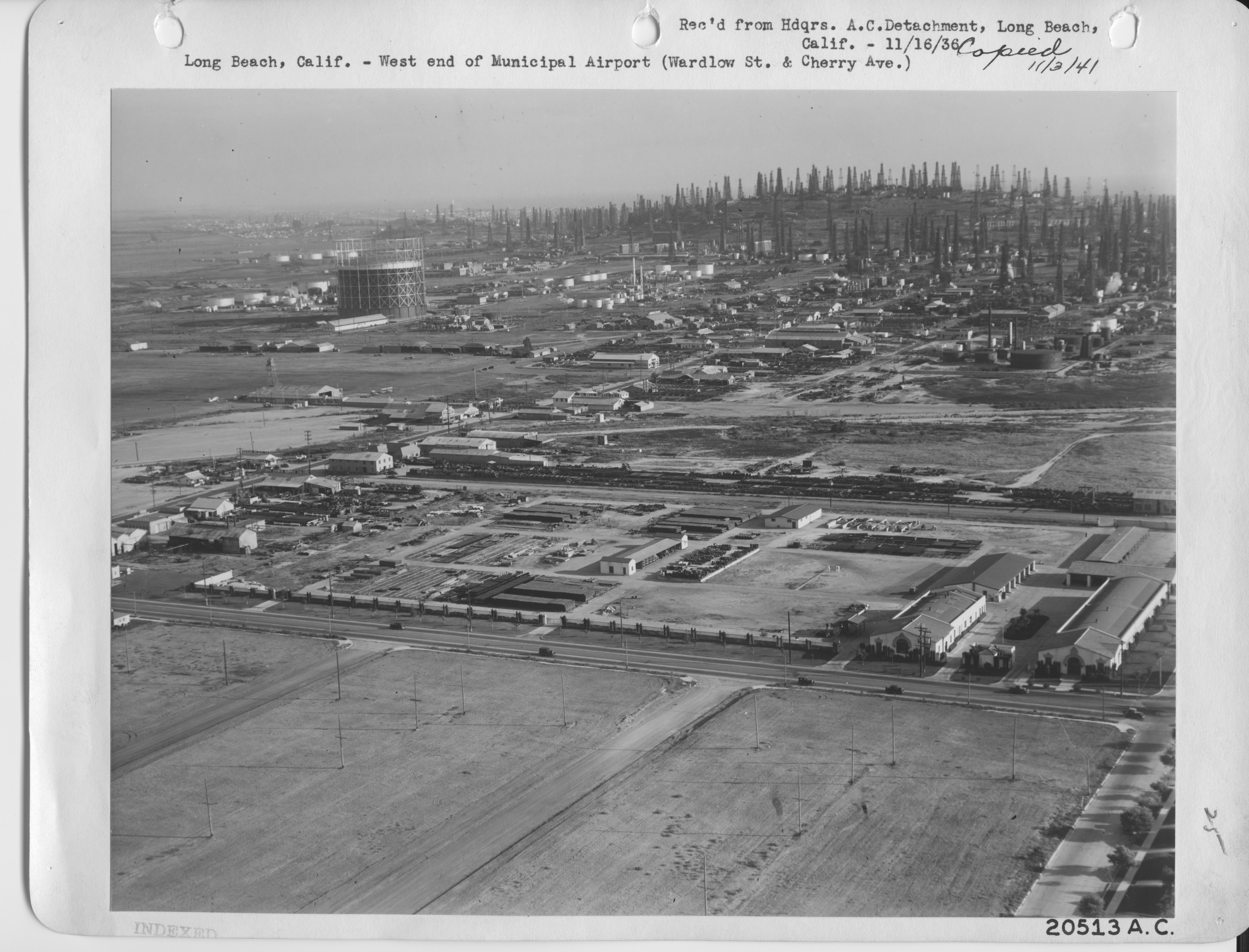
The west end of the airport near Wardlow St. and Cherry Ave. in 1936

Douglas "Wrong Way" Corrigan used to fly regularly out of Daugherty Field. Before his infamous flight from Brooklyn, New York, to Ireland in 1938, he had flown from Long Beach to New York. After authorities refused his request to continue on to Ireland, he was supposed to return to Daugherty Field, but a claimed navigational error routed him to Ireland. He never publicly acknowledged having flown there intentionally.

The main terminal building was designed by architects William Horace Austin and Kenneth Smith Wing and was constructed in 1941.

The murals and mosaics were created by artist Grace Clements and completed in 1941, with the support of the Works Progress Administration. They depict aviation, navigation, and constellations.

In the 1940s and 1950s the only airline nonstops from Long Beach Airport were to Los Angeles, San Diego, and sometimes Catalina Island; in 1962 Western Airlines introduced a daily Electra to San Francisco and one a day to San Diego. Jet schedules began in 1968; in 1969 Western Boeing 737-200s flew to Las Vegas, Oakland, and San Francisco. In 1980 the only jets were Pacific Southwest Airlines flights to SFO.

Between 1990 and 1992 Continental, Delta, TWA, and USAir ended service to LGB, and American Airlines left in early 2006. Alaska Airlines later ended mainline service, but would return in 2026. Delta Connection Regional jet flights continue at LGB, with some mainline service also returning. In February 2016 Southwest Airlines announced plans to begin service to the airport with an initial four available slots. On July 9, 2020, JetBlue announced that they would end service to the airport in October 2020, instead expanding their operations at nearby Los Angeles International Airport.

=== Military use ===
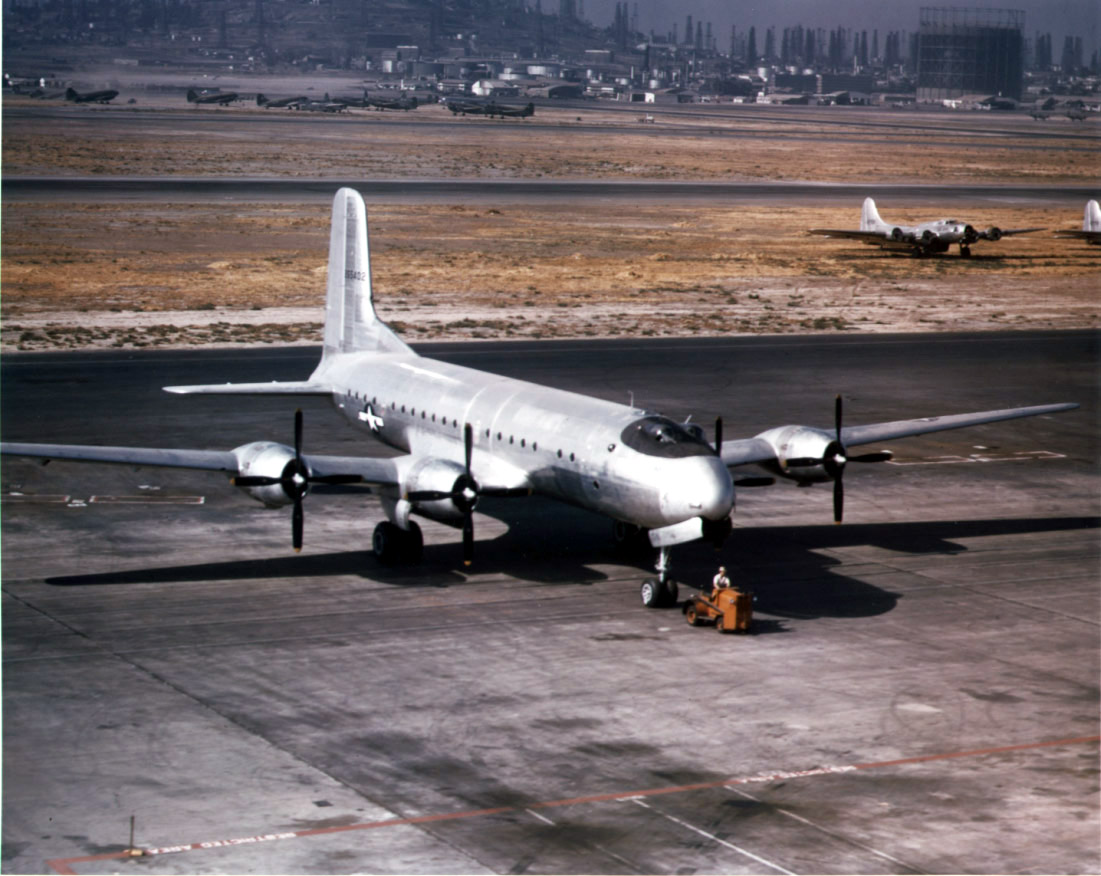
Douglas C-74 Globemaster at Long Beach Airport with Boeing B-17 Flying Fortress and Curtiss C-46 Commando aircraft in the background

To attract the United States Navy, the City of Long Beach built a hangar and an administrative building and then offered to lease it to the Navy for $1 a year for the establishment of a Naval Reserve air base. On May 10, 1928, the U.S. Navy commissioned the field as a Naval Reserve air base (NRAB Long Beach). Two years later the city built a hangar and administrative building for the United States Army Air Corps as well. Significant developments to the little city airport began only after the city built hangars and administrative facilities for the Army and Navy in 1928–30.

As a Naval Reserve Air Base, the mission was to instruct, train and drill Naval Reserve personnel. A ground school was offered three nights a week at the base and two nights a week at the University of California in Los Angeles until 1930, when ground school was continuously offered at the base. On April 9, 1939, training in night flight began, and shortly thereafter its facilities began to be used by fleet aircraft as well.

With increased activity by airlines and the private airplane industry, particularly with Douglas Aircraft showing an interest in the Long Beach Municipal Airport, the facility needed more space. With Douglas Aircraft as a resident, the attitude of Long Beach's authorities became openly hostile to naval aviation, with its city manager saying that "the sooner the Navy gets out of the Long Beach airport, the better we will like it."

The Navy began a survey for another site, unknown to city officials at the time. Admiral Ernest J. King, then the Chief of the Bureau of Aeronautics, and Admirals William D. Leahy, Joseph K. Taussig, and Allen E. Smith pointedly requested that the city of Long Beach repair the runways and reminded the city that the Pacific Fleet, then lying offshore in Long Beach and San Pedro harbors, had a payroll of more than $1 million a month. Eventually, the city complied with the Navy's requests.

The city remained hostile toward approving a lease on any additional land that the Naval Reserve now required.

The Navy, fed up with the city of Long Beach, decided upon the purchase of some property owned by a Mrs. Susanna Bixby Bryant, a fact made known by the commander of the base, Commander Thomas A. Gray, to the Chief of the Bureau of Aeronautics, Admiral John H. Towers. The circumstances behind the purchase were revealed to James V. Forrestal, Under Secretary of the Navy, and by him to the House Naval Affairs committee who approved the purchase. Although Comdr. Gray had offered Mrs. Bryant $350 an acre, in the best patriotic spirit she sold the property at $300 an acre.

With the site acquired, in 1941, construction funds soon followed and NAS Los Alamitos began to take shape. Upon the transfer of the Naval Reserve Training Facility to Los Alamitos, to the surprise of city officials of Long Beach, in 1942, instead of returning the Naval Reserve Air Base facilities at Long Beach to the city, the Navy turned over the facilities to the United States Army Air Forces, which had established a training base next to it. NARB Long Beach was not totally abandoned but became a Naval Auxiliary Air Station (NAAS).

Through World War II the airfield was given over to the war effort. In August 1941 the Civil Aeronautics Administration took over control of the airport, which had grown to 500 acres (2.0 km^{2}). Once Los Alamitos became an operational base in 1941, NAAS Long Beach now turned to servicing carrier-borne F4Fs, SBDs, FM-2s, F4Us, F6Fs, TBF/TBMs, and SB2Cs. In addition, it had utility aircraft and such patrol planes as the PBY, SNB, GB3, NH, GH, and SNJ.

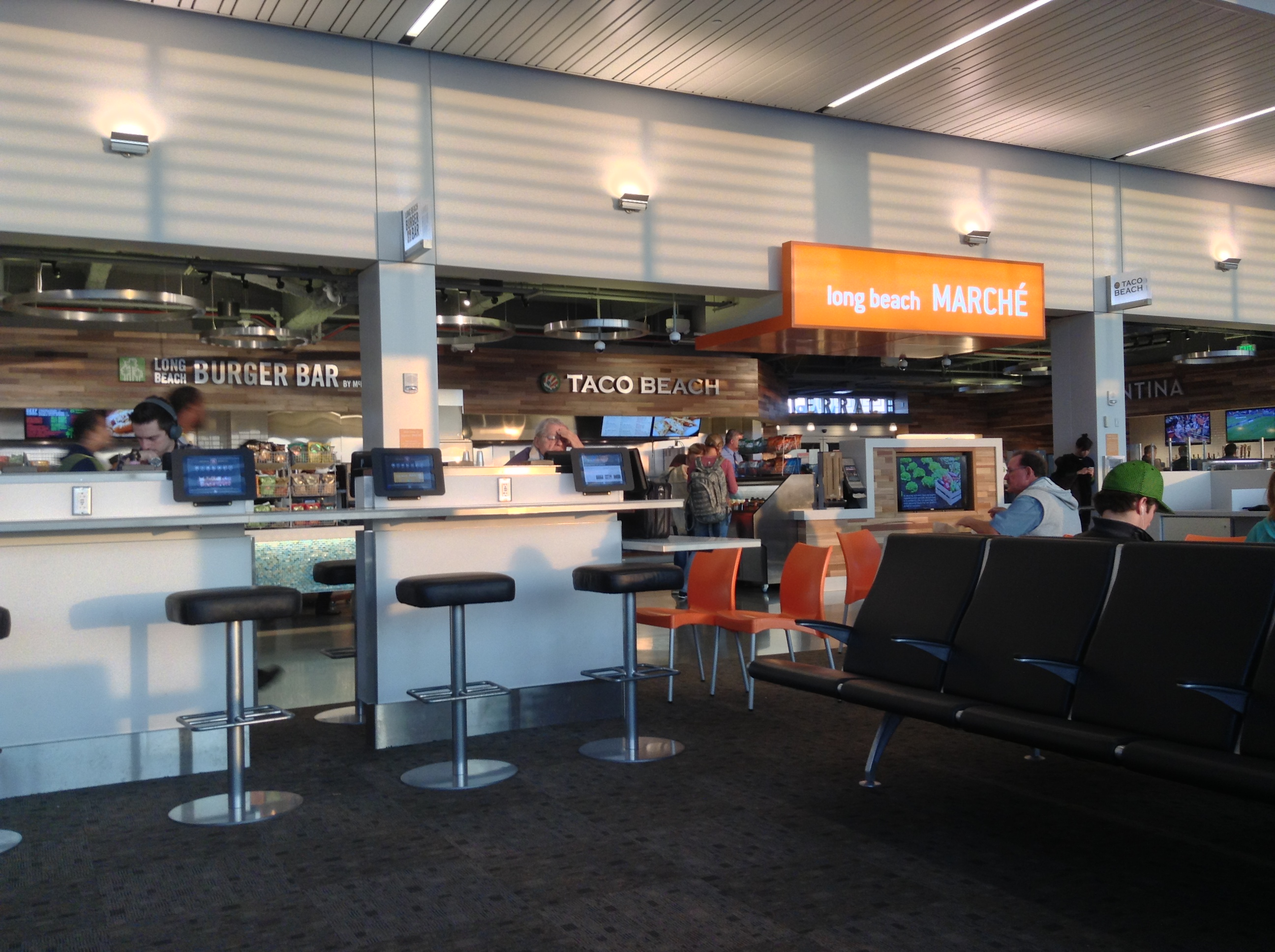
Shops inside the terminal

As the Navy's activities began to be shifted to Los Alamitos, the Long Beach Army Airfield at Long Beach became the home of the Army's Air Transport Command's Ferrying Division, with the 1736th Ferrying Squadron assigned, which included a squadron of 18 women pilots commanded by Barbara London, a long time Long Beach aviator.

Like the Naval Air Ferry Command at NAS Terminal Island, the Army's ferrying work was an immense undertaking, thanks to Douglas Aircraft's wartime production. Ground was broken for the initial Douglas Aircraft facility in November 1940, with dedication in October 1941. Douglas had been drawn to Long Beach's growing municipal airport with its Army and Navy facilities. With wartime contracts, the company went into intensive production. The company's first C-47 was delivered 16 days after the attack of Pearl Harbor and another 4,238 were produced during the war. The plant turned out some 1,000 A-20 Havocs, not to mention 3,000 B-17 Flying Fortresses and 1,156 A-26 Invaders.

With the end of the war the U.S. Navy abandoned any use of Long Beach Municipal Airport and with it the designation of Long Beach as a Naval Auxiliary Air Station.

== Facilities ==
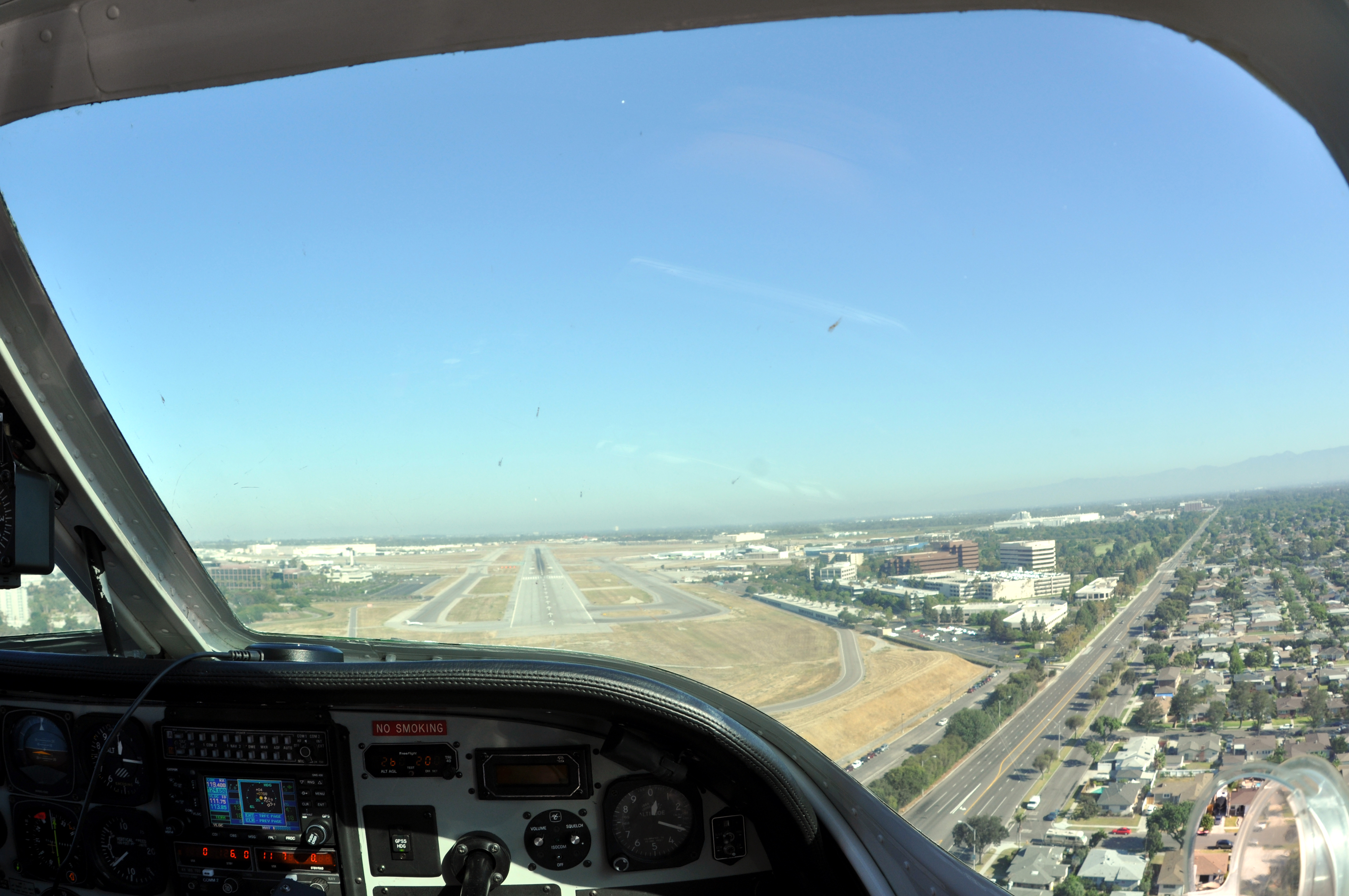
Long Beach Airport's runway 30

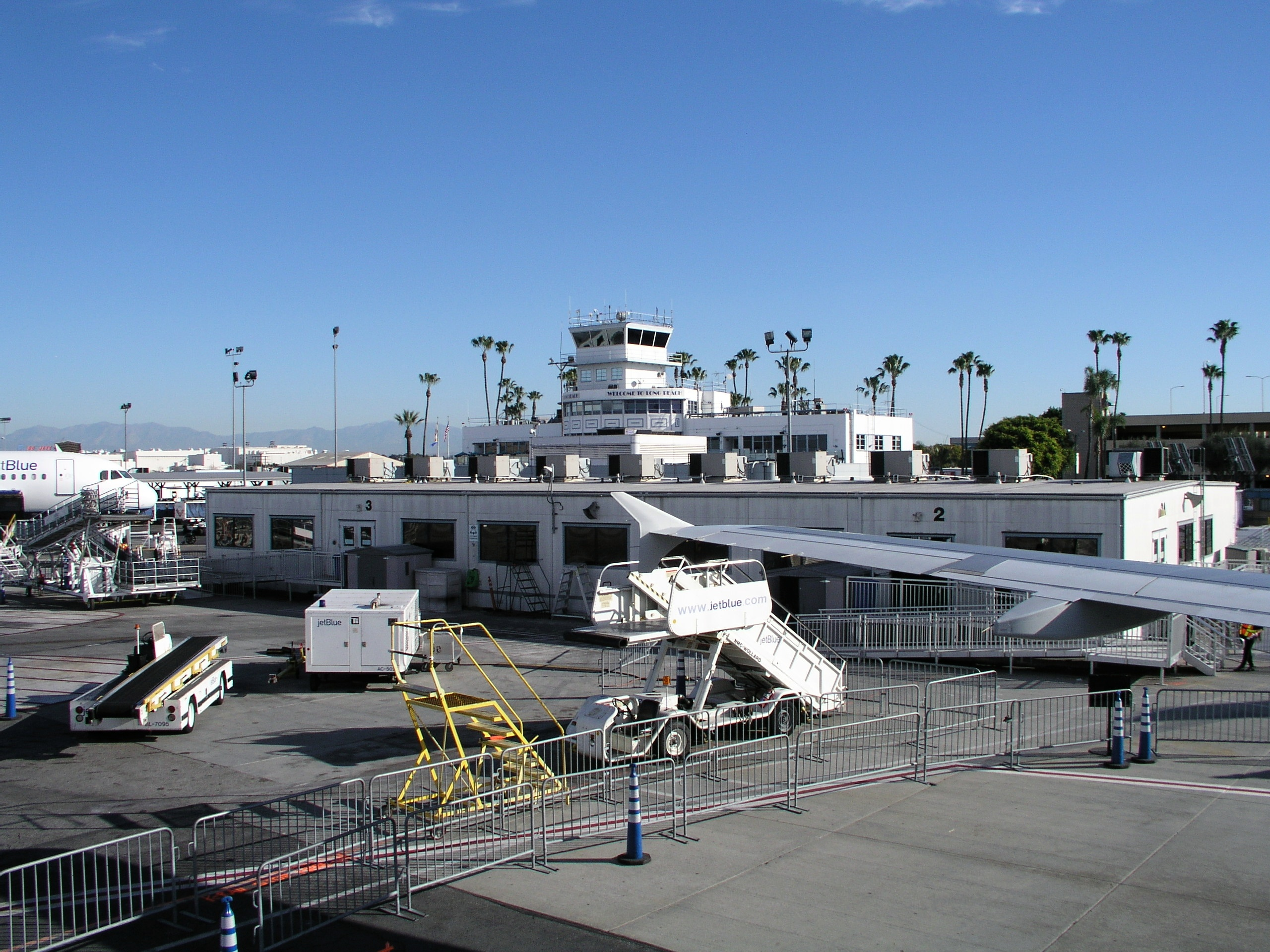
The old terminal building in 2009

Long Beach Airport covers 1,166 acres (472 ha) at an elevation of 60 feet (18 m). It has three asphalt runways:

- 12/30 is 10,000 by 200 feet (3,048 x 61 m).
- 8L/26R is 6,192 by 150 feet (1,887 x 46 m).
- 8R/26L is 3,918 by 100 feet (1,194 x 30 m).

It has four helipads:

- H2 is 20 by 20 feet (6 x 6 m).
- H3 is 300 by 35 feet (91 x 11 m).
- H4 is 20 by 20 feet (6 x 6 m).
- H5 is 20 by 20 feet (6 x 6 m).

Runways 16L/34R and 16R/34L were permanently closed on July 21, 2016. Runway 16L/34R was 3,330 by 75 feet (1,015 x 23 m), and runway 16R/34L was 4,470 by 75 feet (1,362 x 23 m). Both runways were removed.

== Airlines and destinations ==
=== Passenger ===
Airlines	Destinations
Alaska Airlines	Seattle/Tacoma
Delta Connection	Salt Lake City
Hawaiian Airlines	Honolulu, Kahului
Southwest Airlines	Austin, Chicago-Midway, Dallas-Love, Denver, Honolulu, Houston-Hobby, Las Vegas, Nashville, Oakland, Phoenix, Portland (OR), Reno/Tahoe, Sacramento, Salt Lake City, San Jose (CA), Seattle/Tacoma; Seasonal: Bozeman

=== Destinations map ===
Destinations map
Continental U.S. destinations from Long Beach Airport
Red = Year-round destination
Green = Seasonal destination
Blue = Future destination
Dark Green = Destination shared by more than one airline
Hawaii destinations from Long Beach Airport
Red = Year-round destination
Blue = Future destination
Dark Green = Destination shared by more than one airline

== Statistics ==
=== Top destinations ===
Busiest domestic routes from LGB (May 2025 – April 2026)
Rank	City	Passengers	Airlines
1	Las Vegas, Nevada	241,330	Southwest
2	Sacramento, California	207,440	Southwest
3	Phoenix–Sky Harbor, Arizona	176,050	Southwest
4	Oakland, California	160,490	Southwest
5	Salt Lake City, Utah	142,640	Delta, Southwest
6	San Jose, California	126,540	Southwest
7	Denver, Colorado	121,650	Southwest
8	Honolulu, Hawaii	113,590	Hawaiian, Southwest
9	Reno/Tahoe, Nevada	79,910	Southwest
10	Dallas–Love, Texas	79,710	Southwest

=== Airline market share ===
Largest airlines at LGB (May 2025 – April 2026)
Rank	Airline	Passengers	Share
1	Southwest Airlines	3,223,000	88.35%
2	Hawaiian Airlines	165,000	4.52%
3	Delta Air Lines	103,000	2.83%
4	SkyWest Airlines	81,620	2.24%
5	Alaska Airlines	75,200	2.06%

=== Annual traffic ===
Annual passenger traffic at LGB 2000–Present
Year	Passengers	Year	Passengers	Year	Passengers
2000	637,853	2010	2,978,426	2020	1,043,773
2001	587,473	2011	3,099,488	2021	2,104,696
2002	1,453,551	2012	3,206,910	2022	3,242,831
2003	2,875,525	2013	2,942,873	2023	3,739,307
2004	2,926,873	2014	2,823,996	2024	4,148,080
2005	3,034,032	2015	2,523,686	2025	3,818,155
2006	2,758,362	2016	2,852,294	2026	
2007	2,906,556	2017	3,783,805	2027	
2008	2,913,926	2018	3,884,721	2028	
2009	2,909,307	2019	3,584,203	2029	

== Ground transportation ==
Long Beach Transit Routes 102, 104, 111, and 176 serve the airport. Specifically, route 111 southbound from the airport connects to Downtown Long Beach Station, where a passenger can transfer to the A Line northbound to destinations in downtown Los Angeles. Route 104 connects to the Willow Street Station. Route 405 provides weekday service to/from UCLA.

The San Diego Freeway (I-405) can be reached from the airport via Lakewood Boulevard (SR 19). Wardlow Road runs from the airport to the Los Angeles County/Orange County border, where it becomes Ball Road and crosses the north edge of the Disneyland Resort; Long Beach Airport is the second closest airport to Disneyland, after John Wayne Airport.

== Airport improvements program ==
On December 12, 2012, the Long Beach Airport completed a $136 million improvement project designed to modernize the main terminal without sacrificing its historic Art Deco architecture or reputation among travelers for convenience. It was developed to improve the customer experience by providing resort-like amenities, having a central palm garden, outdoor dining areas with fire pits, wine bars, and 11 gates. A new 2,000-space parking structure was completed ahead of schedule and below budget. $5 million was spent to refurbish the old terminal, which was originally built in 1941 and declared a historic landmark by the city decades later. The new terminal retains the open-air feeling of the current terminal complex, and passengers still walk across the tarmac when boarding or leaving their planes. The baggage claim also is partially enclosed, as it was before.

In February 2020, the Long Beach City Council approved of a new $125-million Phase II improvement project. The project includes a new ticketing building and the seismic retrofit of the historic terminal building. The project also includes moving the rental car area into the historical terminal building, new baggage claim areas, and a new meet-and-greet area. Design and construction began in 2020 with six projects completed as of 2025.

== Accidents and incidents ==
- On November 18, 1950, a Trans World Airlines Lockheed L-049 Constellation, after departing Los Angeles International Airport had a malfunction of the #3 then #2 engine and both props were feathered. An instrument approach was attempted at LGB, however, the runway was not visible until halfway down the runway, and the brakes were not effective on the wet, slippery surface. The aircraft ran through a fence and over a spur railroad track, collapsing the right gear, and coming to a stop 1400 feet from the runway. All 60 passengers and crew survived. The plane was substantially damaged but repaired and placed back into service. However, nearly 11 years later, this particular aircraft was destroyed in an accident on September 1, 1961, as TWA Flight 529.
- On December 16, 1956, a Zantop Air Transport Curtiss C-46 Commando made a straight-in visual flight rules (VFR) approach to LGB when encountering an area of ground fog, impacting the ground. All four occupants survived, but the aircraft was destroyed and written off.
- On March 16, 2011, a privately owned Beechcraft King Air crashed shortly after takeoff, killing five people and injuring another. The NTSB determined the cause of the crash to be a result of poor pilot technique that failed to maintain aircraft control, following a momentary interruption of power to the left engine caused by water contamination of the fuel. The NTSB found the water contamination was allowed to build up in the aircraft's fuel sumps due to poor maintenance and pre-flight practices, and a lack of communication between the pilot and aircraft mechanics over who was responsible for draining the sumps before each flight. Because of this, enough water was allowed to build up in the fuel sumps to initiate this accident.

== Movies and television ==
The airport appears in:

- Executive Suite
- The Bachelor and the Bobby-Soxer in the final five minutes
- Rush Hour (1998 film)
- The Parent Trap (1998 film)

== See also ==
- California World War II Army Airfields
- Western Air Defense Force
