= Ontario Peak =

Mountain in California, United States

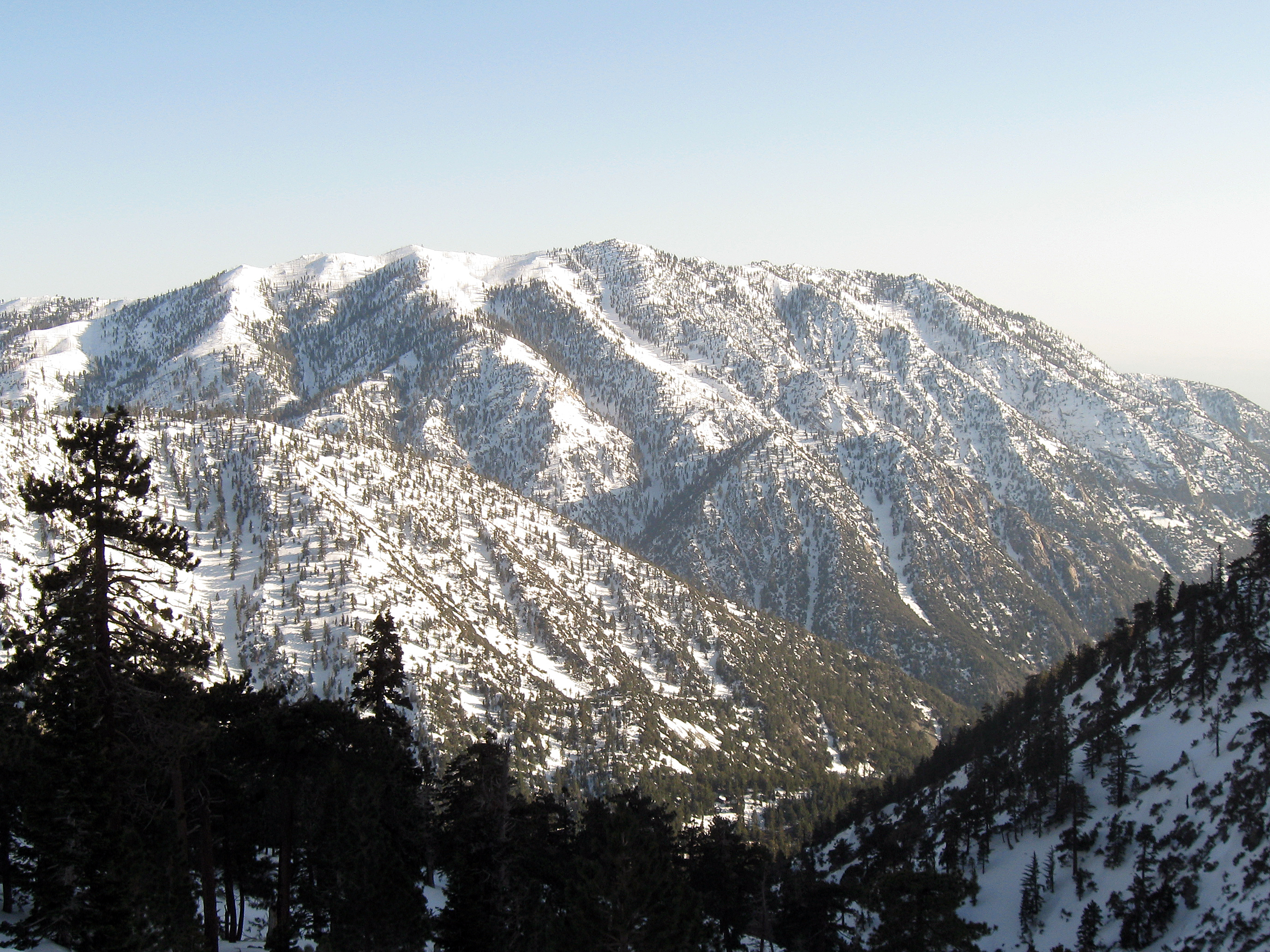

Highest point
- Elevation: 8,696 ft (2,651 m) NAVD 88
- Prominence: 1,039 ft (317 m)
- Parent peak: Cucamonga Peak
- Listing: Hundred Peaks Section
- Coordinates: 34°13′40″N 117°37′26″W

Geography
- Location: San Bernardino County, California, U.S.
- Parent range: San Gabriel Mountains
- Topo map: USGS Cucamonga Peak

Climbing
- Easiest route: Hike, class 1

Ontario Peak is a 8,696 ft (2,651 m) high peak in the San Gabriel Mountains of California. Like its neighbor Cucamonga Peak, it is in the San Bernardino National Forest, and in the Cucamonga Wilderness. The peak is named for the nearby city of Ontario, about 12 mi (19 km) due south, and first appeared in the United States General Land Office Forest Atlas in 1908.

The most accessible trailhead for hiking Ontario Peak is in Icehouse Canyon. Forest Service Trail 7W07 leads from here to Icehouse Saddle, from which the Ontario Peak Trail leads to the summit. This route is 13 miles (20.9 km) round trip, with 4,100 feet (1,200 m) of elevation gain.

== See also ==
- Mount San Antonio
- Pomona Valley
