= Timber Mountain (San Bernardino County, California) =

Mountain in California, United States

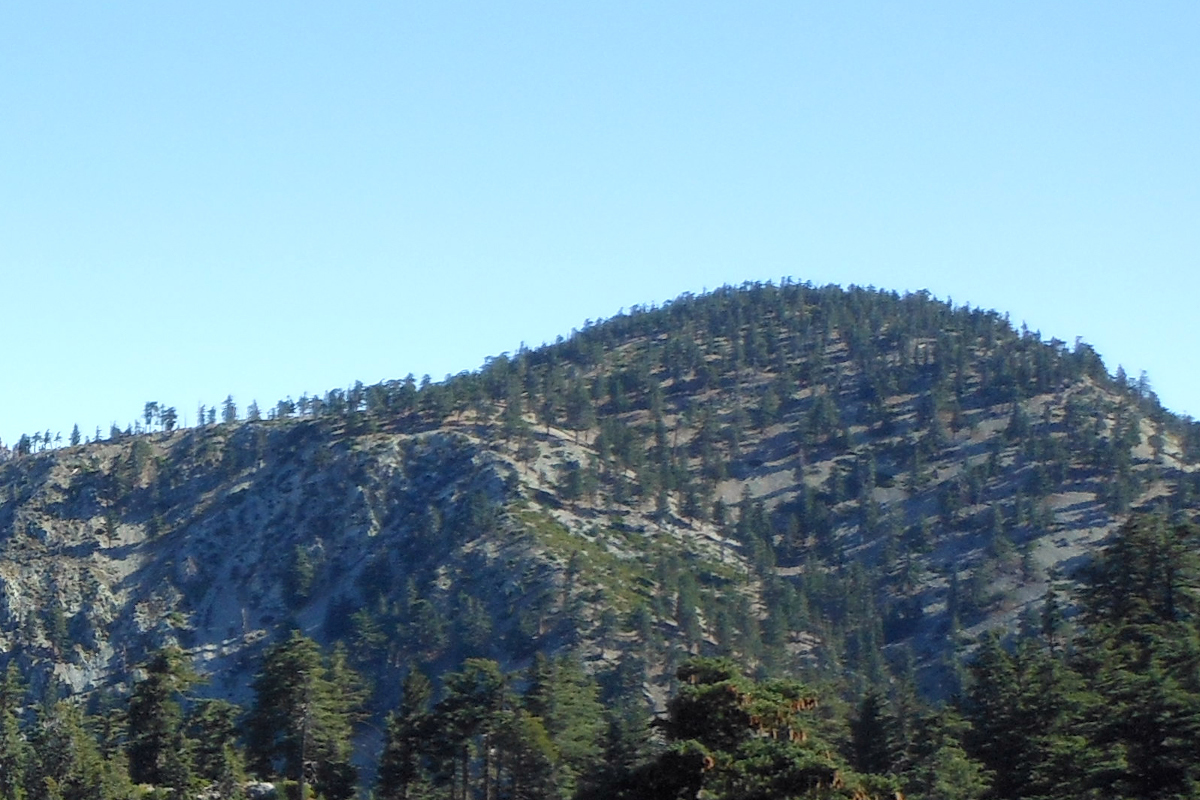
- Summit of Timber Mountain in the San Gabriels.

Highest point
- Elevation: 8,307 ft (2,532 m) NAVD 88
- Prominence: 583 ft (178 m)
- Parent peak: Telegraph Peak
- Listing: Hundred Peaks Section
- Coordinates: 34°14′42″N 117°35′35″W

Geography
- Location within California
- Location: San Bernardino County, California, U.S.
- Parent range: San Gabriel Mountains
- Topo map: USGS Cucamonga Peak

Climbing
- Easiest route: Hike, class 1

Timber Mountain is a peak of the San Gabriel Mountains, located in the Cucamonga Wilderness, Angeles National Forest, San Bernardino County, California.

== History ==
Originally named Chapman Mountain, the peak was renamed Timber Mountain in the mid-20th century.

== Climbing ==
Hikers commonly reach Timber Mountain via the Three T's Trail; it can be approached from the south (via Icehouse Canyon and Icehouse Saddle) or the north (via Telegraph Peak and Thunder Mountain).
