= Potato Mountain =

Mountain in California, United States

- Location within California Location within the United States

Highest point
- Elevation: 3,422 ft (1,043 m) NAVD 88
- Prominence: 480 ft (150 m)
- Parent peak: Mount San Antonio
- Coordinates: 34°10′19″N 117°42′09″W

Geography
- Location: Los Angeles County, California, U.S.
- Parent range: San Gabriel Mountains
- Topo map: USGS Potato Mountain

Climbing
- Easiest route: Hike, class 1

Potato Mountain is a mountain near Claremont, California at the southern edge of the San Gabriel Mountains. It is one of the first mountains visitors encounter entering the Angeles National Forest. Its summit is about 3,422 feet above sea level.
