= Cucamonga Wilderness =

Protected wilderness area in California, United States

- IUCN category Ib (wilderness area)
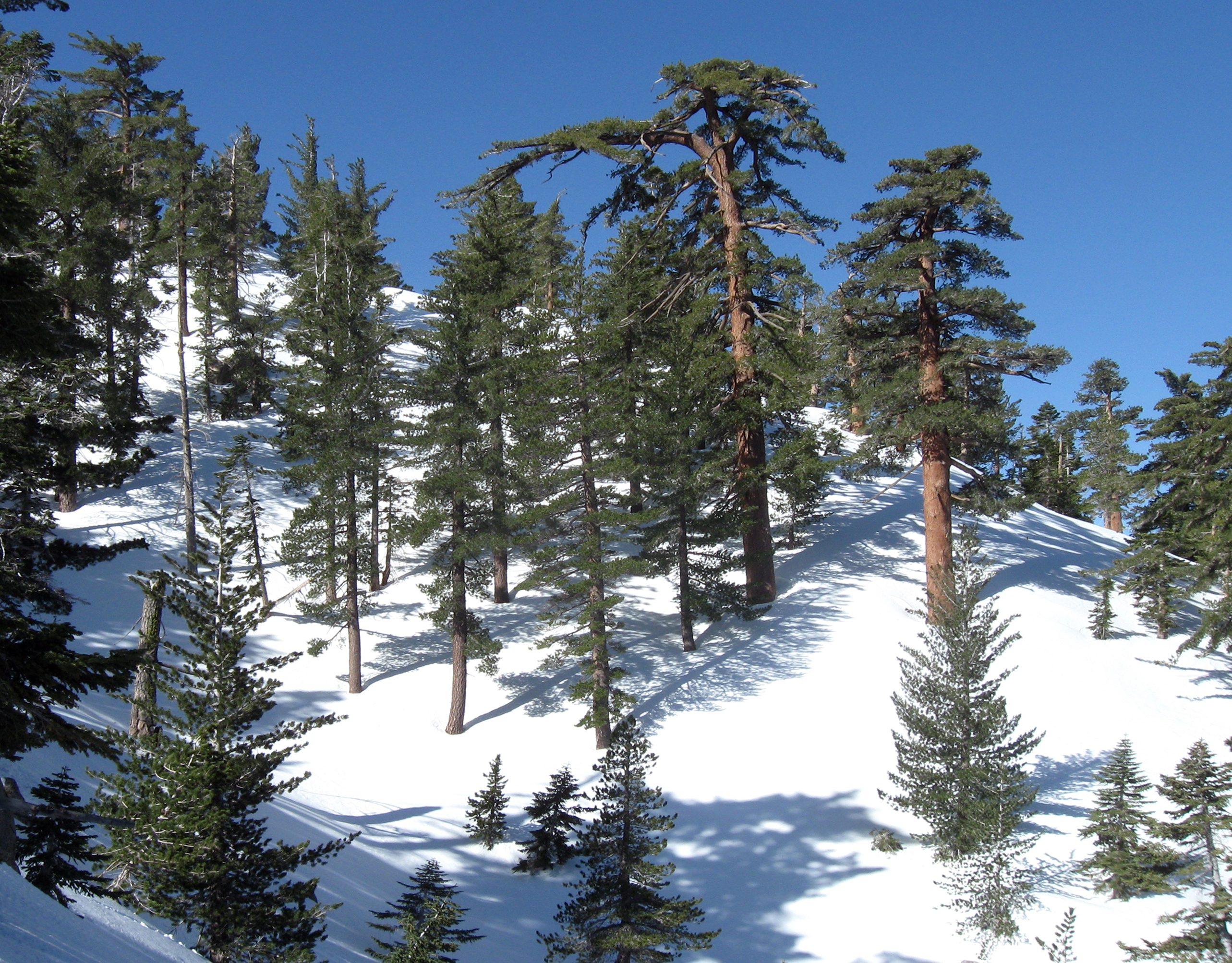
- Sugar pines in the Cucamonga Wilderness

- Location within the Los Angeles metropolitan area Location within California Location within the United States
- Interactive map of Cucamonga Wilderness
- Location: San Bernardino County, California, United States
- Nearest city: Rancho Cucamonga
- Coordinates: 34°14′06″N 117°34′35″W
- Area: 12,781 acres (5,172 ha)
- Established: 1964
- Governing body: United States Forest Service

The Cucamonga Wilderness is a federally designated wilderness area located in the eastern San Gabriel Mountains, in San Bernardino County, Southern California.

The 12,781 acres (5,172 ha) wilderness is managed by the United States Forest Service in Angeles National Forest and San Bernardino National Forest

Elevations range from about 5,000 to 9,000 feet (1,500 to 2,700 m).

== See also ==
- Cucamonga Peak
- Ontario Peak
- Telegraph Peak (California)
- San Gabriel Mountains National Monument−related topics
