= San Gabriel Mountains =

Mountain range of the Transverse Ranges in California, United States

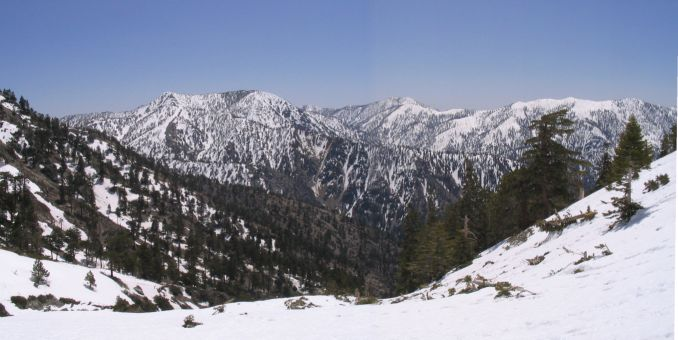
- Summits in the eastern San Gabriel Mountains, Angeles National Forest, San Bernardino County, California. The main peaks are: Telegraph Peak 8,985 feet (2,739 m) (left), Cucamonga Peak, 8,859 feet (2,700 m) (center), and Ontario Peak 8,693 feet (2,650 m) (center right), as seen from Baldy Bowl on Mount San Antonio.

Highest point
- Peak: Mount San Antonio
- Elevation: 10,069 ft (3,069 m)
- Coordinates: 34°17′20″N 117°38′48″W

Dimensions
- Length: 68.4 mi (110.1 km)
- Width: 22.5 mi (36.2 km)
- Area: 970 mi^{2} (2,500 km^{2})

Geography
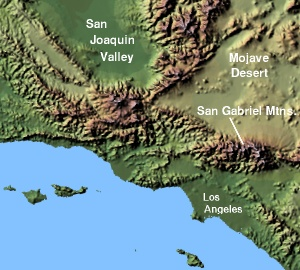
- Country: United States
- State: California
- Counties: Los Angeles, San Bernardino

The San Gabriel Mountains (Spanish: Sierra de San Gabriel) are a mountain range located in Los Angeles and San Bernardino counties, California, United States. The mountain range is part of the Transverse Ranges and lies between the Los Angeles Basin and the Mojave Desert, with Interstate 5 to the west and Interstate 15 to the east. The range lies in, and is surrounded by, the Angeles and San Bernardino National Forests, with the San Andreas Fault as its northern border.

The highest peak in the range is Mount San Antonio, commonly referred to as Mt. Baldy. Mount Wilson is another notable peak, known for the Mount Wilson Observatory and the antenna farm that houses many of the transmitters for local media. The observatory may be visited by the public. On October 10, 2014, President Barack Obama designated the area the San Gabriel Mountains National Monument. The Trust for Public Land has protected more than 3,800 acres (1,500 ha) of land in the San Gabriel Mountains, its foothills, and the Angeles National Forest. The mountains were once known as the Sierra Madre, lending the name to the city of Sierra Madre; however, since 1965, the name "Sierra Madre" has referred to a different mountain range to the west in Santa Barbara County.

== Geography ==
Much of the range features rolling peaks. The range lacks craggy features, but contains a large number of canyons and is generally very rugged and difficult to traverse. The San Gabriel Mountains are composed of a large fault block between the San Andreas Fault Zone to the north, and the San Gabriel Fault and the Sierra Madre-Cucamonga Fault Zones to the south. This tectonic block was uplifted during the Miocene and has since been dissected by numerous rivers and washes.

=== Setting and elevation ===
The highest elevation, Mount San Antonio (Mount Baldy) at 10,069 feet (3,069 m), rises towards the eastern extremity of the range which extends from the Cajon Pass (Interstate 15) on the east, where the San Gabriel Mountain Range meets the San Bernardino Mountain Range, westward to meet the Santa Susana Mountains at Newhall Pass (Interstate 5).

South and east of Santa Clarita and north of San Fernando, the San Gabriel Mountains crest abruptly up to about 4,000 feet (1,200 m). Pacoima and Big Tujunga Canyons cut through the range just east of San Fernando, carrying runoff into the San Fernando Valley. Little Tujunga Canyon Road bridges the range in this area, connecting the San Fernando Valley to the Santa Clara River valley in the north. Towering over Big Tujunga Canyon north of Big Tujunga Reservoir, and south of Acton, is Mount Gleason, which at 6,502 feet (1,982 m), is the highest in this region of the San Gabriels. South of the gorge is the southern "foothills" of the mountains, which rise abruptly 4,000 feet (1,200 m) above the Los Angeles Basin and give rise to the Arroyo Seco, a tributary of the Los Angeles River.

Southeast of Big Tujunga Canyon, the southern front range of the San Gabriels gradually grows in elevation, culminating in notable peaks such as Mount Wilson at 5,710 feet (1,740 m). On the north the range is abruptly dissected by the canyon of the West Fork San Gabriel River. Even further north the range slopes up into the towering main crest of the San Gabriels, a sweeping arc-shaped massif 30 miles (48 km) in length that includes most of the highest peaks in the range: Waterman Mountain, at 8,038 feet (2,450 m); Mount Islip, at 8,250 feet (2,510 m), Mount Baden-Powell, at 9,399 feet (2,865 m), Pine Mountain, at 9,648 feet (2,941 m), and Mount San Antonio, the highest peak in the range at 10,068 feet (3,069 m).

On the north slopes of the San Gabriel crest, the northern ranks of mountains drop down incrementally to the floor of the Mojave Desert in a much more gradual manner than the sheer southern flank. The Angeles Crest Highway, one of the main routes across the San Gabriels, runs through this area from west to east. Littlerock, Big Rock, and Sheep Creeks drain off the northern part of the mountains, forming large alluvial fans as they descend into the Mojave. To the east, the San Andreas Fault cuts across the range, forming a series of long, straight, and narrow depressions, including Swarthout Valley and Lone Pine Canyon. South of Mount San Antonio, San Antonio Creek drains the mountains, cutting the deep San Antonio Canyon.

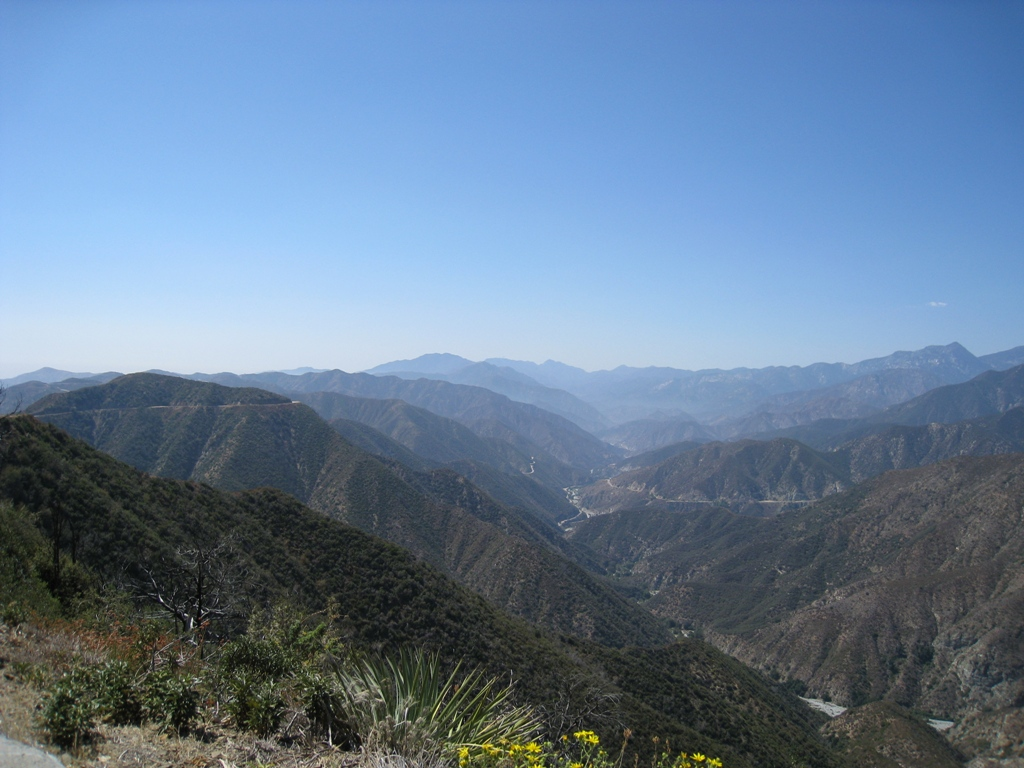
East Fork San Gabriel River canyon, looking west

East of San Antonio Canyon, the range gradually loses elevation, and the highest peaks in this section of the mountain range are in the south, rising dramatically above the cities of Claremont, Upland and Rancho Cucamonga. However, there are still several notable peaks in this region, including Telegraph Peak, at 8,985 feet (2,739 m), Cucamonga Peak, at 8,859 feet (2,700 m), and Ontario Peak, rising 8,693 feet (2,650 m). Lytle Creek, flowing generally southeast, drains most of the extreme eastern San Gabriels. The range terminates at Cajon Pass, through which runs Interstate 15, and beyond which rise the even higher San Bernardino Mountains.

=== Locale ===
The Range is bounded on the north by the Antelope Valley and the Mojave Desert and to the south by the communities of Greater Los Angeles. The south side of the range is almost continuously urbanized and includes the Los Angeles city communities of Sylmar, Pacoima, and Sunland-Tujunga, as well as cities and unincorporated areas of San Fernando, La Crescenta, La Cañada Flintridge, Altadena, Pasadena, Sierra Madre, Arcadia, Monrovia, Bradbury, Duarte, Azusa, Glendora, San Dimas, La Verne, Claremont, Upland, Rancho Cucamonga, Fontana, Rialto and West San Bernardino. The north side of the range is less densely populated and includes the city of Palmdale as well as the small unincorporated towns of Acton, Littlerock, Pearblossom, Valyermo, Llano, Piñon Hills, and Phelan. At the west end of the range lies the city of Santa Clarita. Within the mountains themselves are the small unincorporated communities of Mount Baldy, Wrightwood, Big Pines and Lytle Creek.

=== Hydrology ===
Melting snow and rain runoff on the south side of the San Gabriels' highest mountains give rise to its largest river, the San Gabriel River. Just to the west of Mount Hawkins, a north–south divide separates water running down the two main forks of the river and their tributaries. The West Fork, beginning at Red Box Saddle, runs 14 miles (23 km) eastward, and the East Fork, starting north of Mount San Antonio, flows 18 miles (29 km) south and west through a steep, rugged and precipitous gorge. The two meet at San Gabriel Reservoir and turn south, boring through the southern portion of the San Gabriels, draining the mountains near Azusa, flowing into the urban San Gabriel Valley, and eventually to the Pacific Ocean near Seal Beach.

=== Peaks ===
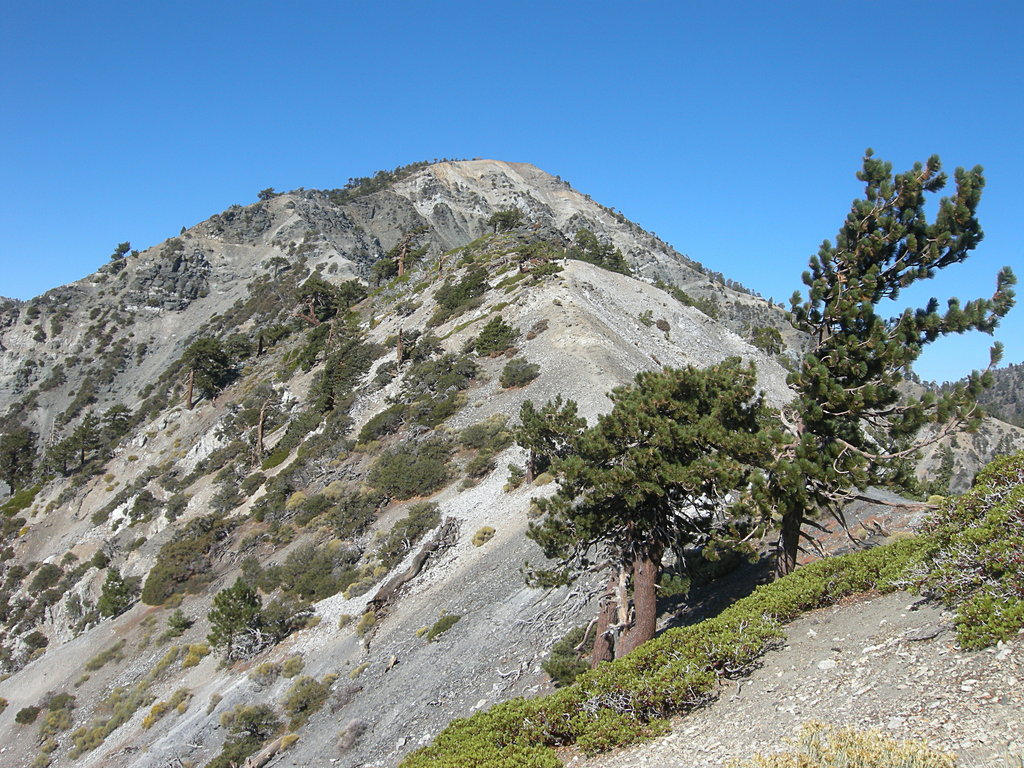
Mount Harwood, from Devils Backbone

San Gabriel Mountains peaks within the Angeles National Forest include:

- Mount San Antonio (Mount Baldy), 10,064 ft (3,068 m)
- Pine Mountain, 9,648 ft (2,941 m)
- Dawson Peak, 9,575 ft (2,918 m)
- Mount Harwood, 9,552 ft (2,911 m)
- Mount Baden-Powell, 9,399 ft (2,865 m)
- Throop Peak, 9,138 ft (2,785 m)
- Mount Burnham, 9,001 ft (2,744 m)
- Telegraph Peak, 8,985 ft (2,739 m)
- Cucamonga Peak, 8,859 ft (2,700 m)
- Ontario Peak, 8,693 ft (2,650 m)
- Mount Lewis, 8,396 ft (2,559 m)
- Timber Mountain, 8,307 ft (2,532 m)
- Mount Islip, 8,250 ft (2,510 m) — site of historic Mt. Islip fire lookout tower
- Mount Williamson, 8,214 ft (2,504 m)
- Waterman Mountain, 8,038 ft (2,450 m)
- Iron Mountain, 8,007 ft (2,441 m)
- South Mount Hawkins, 7,783 ft (2,372 m) — lookout destroyed in Curve Fire, 2002
- Pallett Mountain, 7,779 ft (2,371 m)
- Pacifico Mountain, 7,124 ft (2,171 m)
- Mount Gleason, 6,502 ft (1,982 m)
- Strawberry Peak, 6,164 ft (1,879 m)
- San Gabriel Peak, 6,162 ft (1,878 m)
- Mount Disappointment, 5,960 ft (1,820 m)
- Mount Lawlor, 5,961 ft (1,817 m)
- Vetter Mountain, 5,911 ft (1,802 m) — site of historic Vetter Mountain Fire lookout tower
- Rattlesnake Peak, 5,826 ft (1,776 m)
- Mount Wilson, 5,710 ft (1,740 m) — location of the Mount Wilson Observatory
- Mount Lowe, 5,703 ft (1,738 m) — site of Mount Lowe Railway
- Iron Mountain, 5,636 ft (1,718 m)
- Josephine Peak, 5,561 ft (1,695 m)
- Condor Peak, 5,440 ft (1,660 m)
- Monrovia Peak, 5,409 ft (1,649 m)
- Rankin Peak, 5,269 ft (1,606 m)
- Smith Mountain, 5,111 ft (1,558 m)
- Mount Lukens, 5,074 ft (1,547 m)
- Mount McKinley, 4,925 ft (1,501 m)
- Magic Mountain, 4,864 ft (1,483 m)
- Mendenhall Peak, 4,636 ft (1,413 m)
- Clamshell Peak, 4,360 ft (1,330 m)
- Los Piñetos Peak 3,560 ft (1,090 m)
- Kagel Mountain, 3,537 ft (1,078 m)
- Potato Mountain, 3,422 ft (1,043 m)
- Echo Mountain, 3,210 ft (980 m)
- Bare Mountain 6,388 ft (1,947 m)
- Hoyt Mountain 4,416 ft (1,346 m)
- Wright Mountain 8,505 ft (2,592 m)
- Mount Markham 5,742 ft (1,750 m)
- Akawie Peak 7,283 ft (2,220 m)

== Climate ==
The climate of the range varies with elevation from continental to Mediterranean, with mostly dry summers (except for scattered summer thunderstorms) and cold, wet winters. Snow can fall above 3,000 ft (900 m) elevation during cold fronts between November and April, but is most common in December through March. Annual precipitation totals are mostly in excess of 25 in (640 mm) on the coastal (southern) slopes above 3,000 ft (900 m) elevation, with up to 45 in (1,100 mm) falling in some areas above 5,000 ft (1,500 m).

The coastal (south) side of the range receives vastly more precipitation than the desert (northern) side. The highest precipitation is found in the central and eastern parts of the range (Mt. Wilson to Mt. San Antonio). Annual precipitation totals are highly variable from year to year, and can be extremely high during wet El Nino years (sometimes over 70 in (1,800 mm), with single storm totals over 10 in (250 mm)). Runoff from the mountains during big storms often produces flooding in adjacent foothill communities (especially in areas denuded by wildfires). The range is mostly smog-free above 5,000 ft (1,500 m) elevation, above the inversion layer. The large telescope installation at Mt. Wilson is a testimony to the clear atmospheric conditions that prevail, although light pollution from the L.A. basin below has hindered telescope activities in recent decades.

=== Wildfires ===
The San Gabriel Mountains sees frequent wildfires. They are often driven by dry Santa Ana wind events in the summer and fall. Notable wildfires in the San Gabriel Mountains have included the 2009 Station Fire, 2020 Bobcat Fire, the 2024 Bridge Fire, and the 2025 Greater Los Angeles Wildfires.

== Geology ==
Granitic and metasedimentary rocks are the primary constituent of the San Gabriel Mountains. Metasedimentary rocks were attached to the North American craton during the Precambrian era, and granitic rocks formed throughout the Mesozoic as oceanic plates subducted underneath the North American west coast. Like nearly all of the other mountains in the Transverse Ranges, the San Gabriels are a series of fault blocks that were uplifted in the Cenozoic. Tectonic uplift rates and erosion rates systematically increase as topography steepens eastward in the San Gabriel Mountains, where the San Andreas and San Jacinto faults meet.

Current rates of erosion in the eastern San Gabriel mountains are among the fastest in the continental United States and have accelerated in response to the increased frequency of wildfires over the 1900s. Over future centuries, it remains unclear whether soil and brush ecosystems in the San Gabriel mountains will continue to re-establish soil and vegetation after increasing fire and soil-erosion frequencies, or if increasing fire frequencies and erosion will strip soils and permanently alter soil cover and vegetation types across the mountain ecosystem.

== History ==
=== Indigenous History ===
For thousands of years before the arrival of the Spanish in the Los Angeles basin, the San Gabriel Mountains have been home to Indigenous peoples. Several of the groups that either inhabited or traveled through the mountain range include the Gabrielino-Tongva, Fernandeño Tataviam, Serrano (Yuhaviatam), Kitanemuk, and Chumash. These groups relied on the San Gabriel Mountains for resources and took care to sustain its ecosystem. The Tongva, for instance, practiced sustainable resource management. Women were practitioners of ethnobotany and gathered food from plants such as acorns (kwi), chia seeds, manzanita berries, and mountain cherries. Men hunted deer and rabbits using greasewood-shaft arrows, while the community’s fishermen caught steelhead trout with yucca-fiber nets. Controlled fires were also used deliberately to promote growth.

In addition to being a massive resource base, the mountains served the people as a sacred and cultural landscape and were viewed as living entities The legend of Mount San Antonio’s (Mount Baldy) creation describes two brothers, Sea-god and Land-god, who fought over humanity. When Sea-god tried to flood the earth, Land-god raised the mountains to protect the people, forming the San Gabriel range. Another myth goes that the Serrano followed a white eagle to settle around Mount San Antonio, which marked a territorial boundary between their people and the Tongva.

The mountains connected the coast, valleys, and desert regions, facilitating trade and inter-tribal relations. Goods—such as shells, pigments, foods, and tools—, stories, and rituals were exchanged, and intermarriage also occurred. To get to Chilao in the backcountry, one main route climbed the West Fork San Gabriel River toward Mount Wilson, Red Box Saddle, and Millard Canyon. Other routes connected with desert tribes by traversing the entire range and entering the Mojave Desert

=== Indigenous People and Mission San Gabriel ===
Following Spanish colonization in the late 18th century, many Indigenous communities in the San Gabriel region were displaced to nearby missions. The construction of Mission San Gabriel Arcángel (1771–1775) marked the fourth California mission, which was built and sustained by the Gabrielino-Tongva people.

Missionization disrupted Tongva spiritual, social, and environmental practices as the people underwent conversion and forced intensive agricultural and domestic labor. Under these conditions, communities endured starvation, illness, and violence. The San Gabriel Cemetery contains over 6,000 Indigenous burials. The establishment of Mission San Gabriel also marked the destruction of preexisting villages such as Asuksangna, which had flourished near the San Gabriel River before Spanish settlement. Traditional ecological knowledge and Indigenous practices declined significantly by the 19th century due to European infringement. Indigenous tradition continued to disappear with the influx of white settlers who travelled to the San Gabriel Mountains during the Gold Rush.

=== 19th-century Mining ===
In 1842, Placerita Canyon in the western San Gabriel Mountains was the site of California’s first confirmed gold discovery. These early discoveries were made by Mexican Californios, who used local indigenous trails to access mining sites. Mining camps were established along the canyons of the San Gabriel Mountains in the 19th century and into areas such as the East Fork of the San Gabriel River, where the historic mining town of Eldoradoville is located. Near Mill Creek and Roundtop Mountain is the Monte Cristo Gold Mine, a famous site associated with the legend of the Lost Padre Mine from the mission days. Monte Cristo was once one of the largest gold-producing mines in the San Gabriel area. Accounts of its total yield from 1923 to 1928 range from $70,000 to $200,000. By the late 1930s, most serious mining ventures in the San Gabriel Mountains had ended.

As gold production declined, economic activities in the mountains shifted toward timber, homesteading, and recreation, which led into the "Great Hiking Era” (1880-1938). The erosion, sedimentation, and deforestation that was caused by mining later influenced forest conservation policy. The San Gabriel Timberland Reserve of 1892 was the result of public calls for watershed protection in response to the environmental degradation and fire damage of the late 19th century. This reserve served as a precursor to the Angeles National Forest.

== Ecology ==
There are both areas of conifer as well as broadleaf forestation, including the presence of some endemic taxa. Conifer (pine, fir, cedar) and oak forests are most widespread above 5,000 feet (1,500 m) where the precipitation is above 30 inches (760 mm) (the central and eastern high San Gabriels). In the wetter areas, madrone and bay laurel trees also occur in places, and ferns are common. Trees like willow, alder, and cottonwood are also found throughout the range along with the stream courses (riparian habitat), even at lower elevations. Chaparral (dense shrub, brush, and small tree) vegetation is widespread where there is no continuous tall tree cover, especially at lower elevations. Chaparral is highly adapted to fire and replaces trees for decades after fires. With the recent increase in wildfire frequency and damage, chaparral occupies more and more of the San Gabriels each year. There is a subspecies of the leather oak which is found only within the San Gabriel Mountains. The Rift Zone along the San Andreas Fault produces numerous springs, sag ponds, and wetland areas that are critical habitats for a variety of native species. A prime example of such a sag pond is Jackson Lake just west of Wrightwood.

Larger animals include California mule deer, California black bear, San Pedro Martir coyote and the rarely seen mountain lion or cougar. Smaller mammals include raccoons, opossum, skunk, and bobcats. Golden and bald eagles are found rarely, but hawks are common. Rattlesnakes are common and often encountered on trails by hikers. Critically endangered yellow-legged frogs have declined or vanished from the streams due to the loss of suitable habitat. The San Gabriel Canyon system in the San Gabriel Mountains is also home to a rare endemic species of salamander, the San Gabriel slender salamander, which is only known to be found above 850 metres elevation.

The San Gabriel Mountains were once home to a thriving population of Southern Steelhead. The Arroyo Seco and San Gabriel River had two major populations, but due to damming and channelization, these fish cannot make it upstream anymore. However, wild native rainbow trout still exist in streams and ponds throughout the mountains.

== Transportation ==
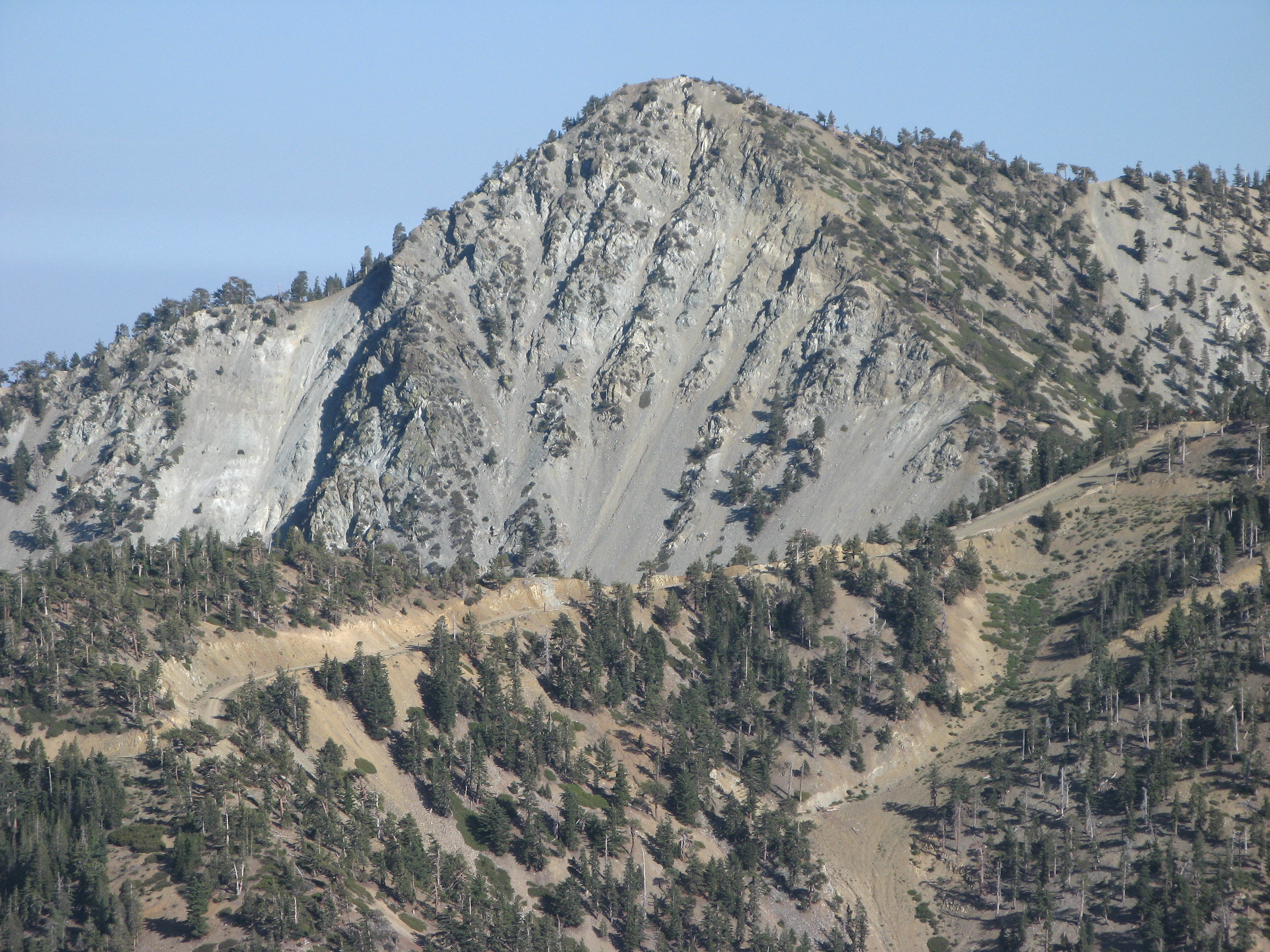
Telegraph Peak as seen from the ridge of Devils Backbone on Mount San Antonio

The main road that runs through the San Gabriel Mountains is the Angeles Crest Highway, State Route 2. It starts in the southwest at the city of La Cañada Flintridge and ends at its junction with State Route 138, just past Wrightwood, near the Victor Valley and the western Cajon Valley. Past its junction with Angeles Forest Highway, traveling east, Angeles Crest Highway features blind curves, various bumps, and potholes. This section of the "Crest" is closed during the winter due to rockfall and avalanche hazards. State Route 2, just past Mountain High, is called the Big Pines Highway to the Route 138 junction.

Another key county route through, the mountains is Angeles Forest Highway. The highway begins 11 miles northeast of La Cañada Flintridge at its Angeles Crest Highway junction. Ending near Acton, it allows easy access to the central Forest and the fast-growing Antelope Valley. Because the "Forest" and the 11-mile (18 km) "Crest" portion leading to La Cañada Flintridge is well traveled by Antelope Valley commuters, its road maintenance is much better, and it is open much of the winter.

State Route 39 connected the city of Azusa with the Angeles Crest Highway until it was seriously damaged by landslides, first in 1978, and again in 2005. The highway was opened to emergency crews in February 2003.

People heading to Mount Waterman must now travel west to Pasadena and then travel on the Angeles Crest Highway (Highway 2) in La Cañada Flintridge, a nearly two-hour trip. Reopening Highway 39 would cut the drive time to the Waterman Ski Area in half and shorten the trip east to Wrightwood.

According to the Caltrans District Seven "Inside Seven" Newsletter, "Two projects that will address those issues and get the highway reopened are scheduled for construction soon. The first, building two retaining walls near the city of Azusa from Old San Gabriel Canyon Road to approximately 4 miles (6.4 km) south of SR-2, could begin in mid-2009. The second, a $45 million project to reconstruct the roadway, construct soldier pile retaining walls, repair drainage systems, install rockfall protection, and provide asphalt concrete overlay and traffic striping, should begin in fall 2010."

In 2011, the planned repair of the road was abruptly terminated, due to concerns of high future maintenance costs, and potential impact on the local bighorn sheep population. However, in October 2016, Caltrans announced it was again considering plans to reopen the road, after pressure from local communities.

== Recreation ==
In the winter, snowboarding and skiing are quite popular in the San Gabriels, at Mountain High and Mt. Baldy. The two other resorts, Mount Waterman and Kratka Ridge, are rarely open due to insufficient snow. In the summer, canyoneering, hiking, backpacking, picnicking, and camping are some of the activities popular with visitors. From time to time, a hiker gets lost or stuck on a mountain ledge or may fall downhill. Some of the more extreme cases of emergency search-and-rescue efforts will often be given air time on Los Angeles television and radio newscasts. The Pacific Crest Trail passes along the mountain ridge.

During the winter, many Southern California mountaineers climb a variety of snow routes and even some ice routes in the San Gabriel Mountains. Baldy Bowl is by far the most popular route, getting hundreds of climbers per season. There are numerous other routes.

Rock climbing is not as common in the San Gabriel Range as it is in neighboring areas, as this range is notable for loose rock. Various faults crisscross the range, making it one of the steepest and fastest-growing ranges in the world. Plate tectonic activity breaks up most rock, making it unsuitable for rock climbing. Williamson Rock was the most famous climbing area until it was closed to climbing. There are many other craggy areas scattered about the range that provide mostly traditional climbing opportunities.

The Angeles National Forest Fire Lookout Association has rebuilt and operates Vetter Mountain Lookout, and Slide Mountain Lookout. The organization is rebuilding South Mount Hawkins Lookout.

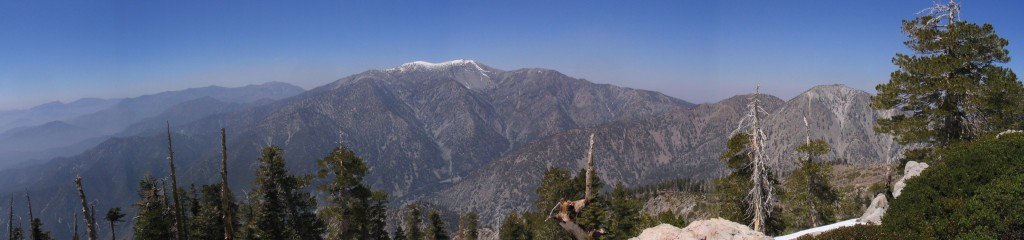
Panorama of the range, from Ontario Peak looking west and north, Mount Baldy in the center

== Nearby ranges ==
- San Rafael Hills
- Santa Ana Mountains
- Verdugo Mountains
- San Bernardino Mountains
- Santa Susana Mountains
- Santa Monica Mountains
- Sierra Pelona Mountains
- Topatopa Mountains
- Tehachapi Mountains

== Gallery ==
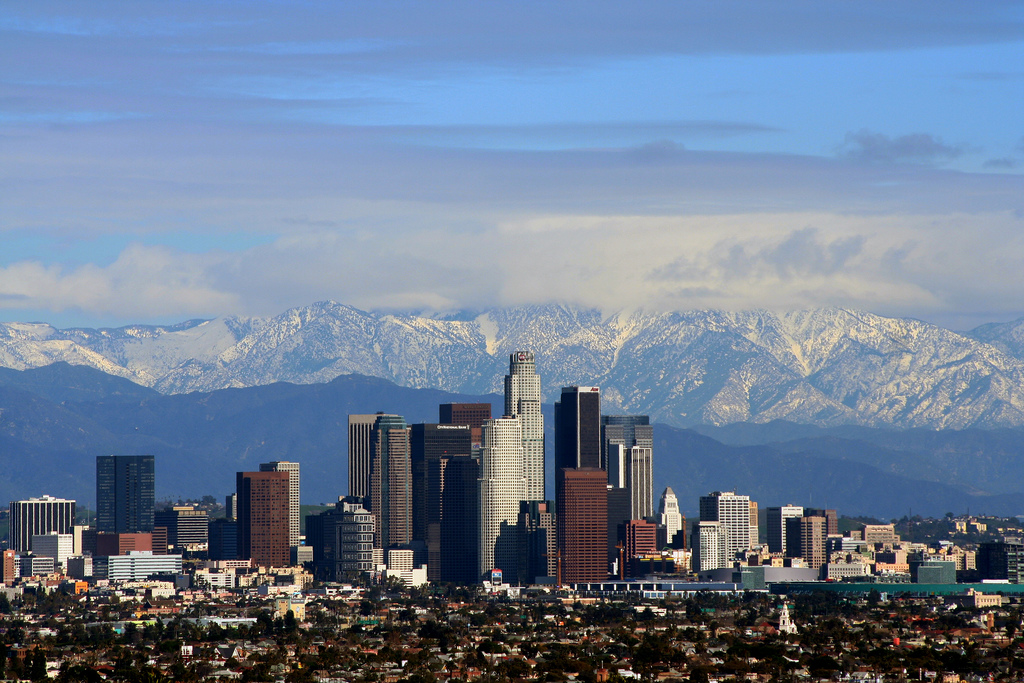
San Gabriel Mountains east of downtown Los Angeles

San Gabriel Wilderness

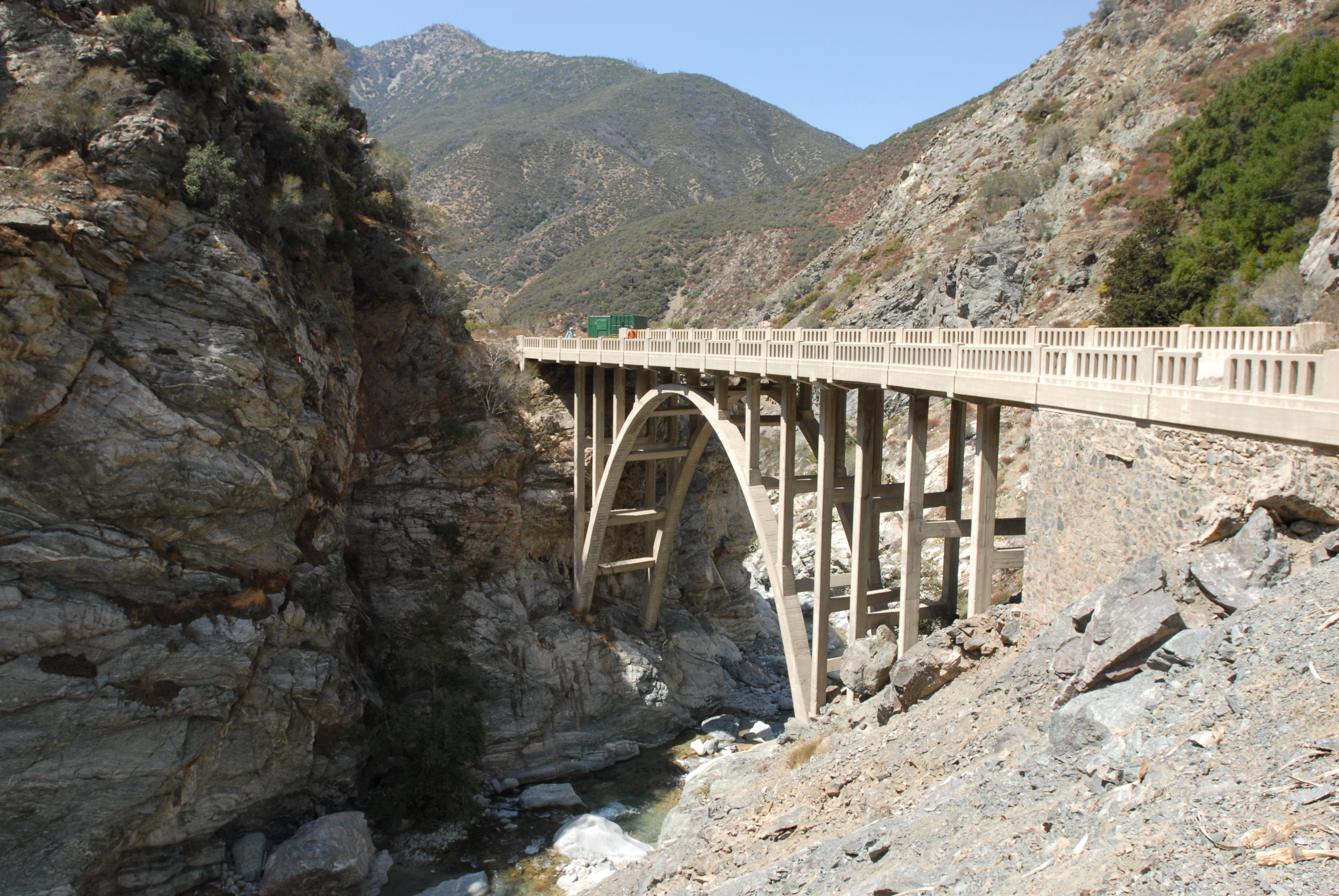
The Bridge to Nowhere

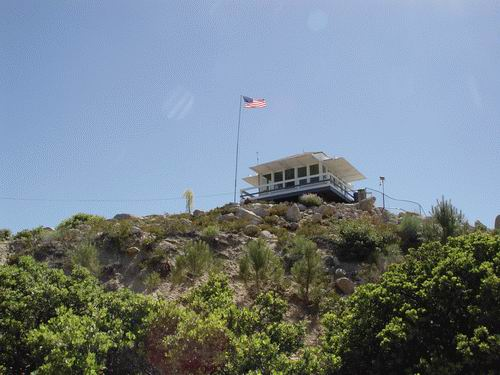
Vetter Lookout

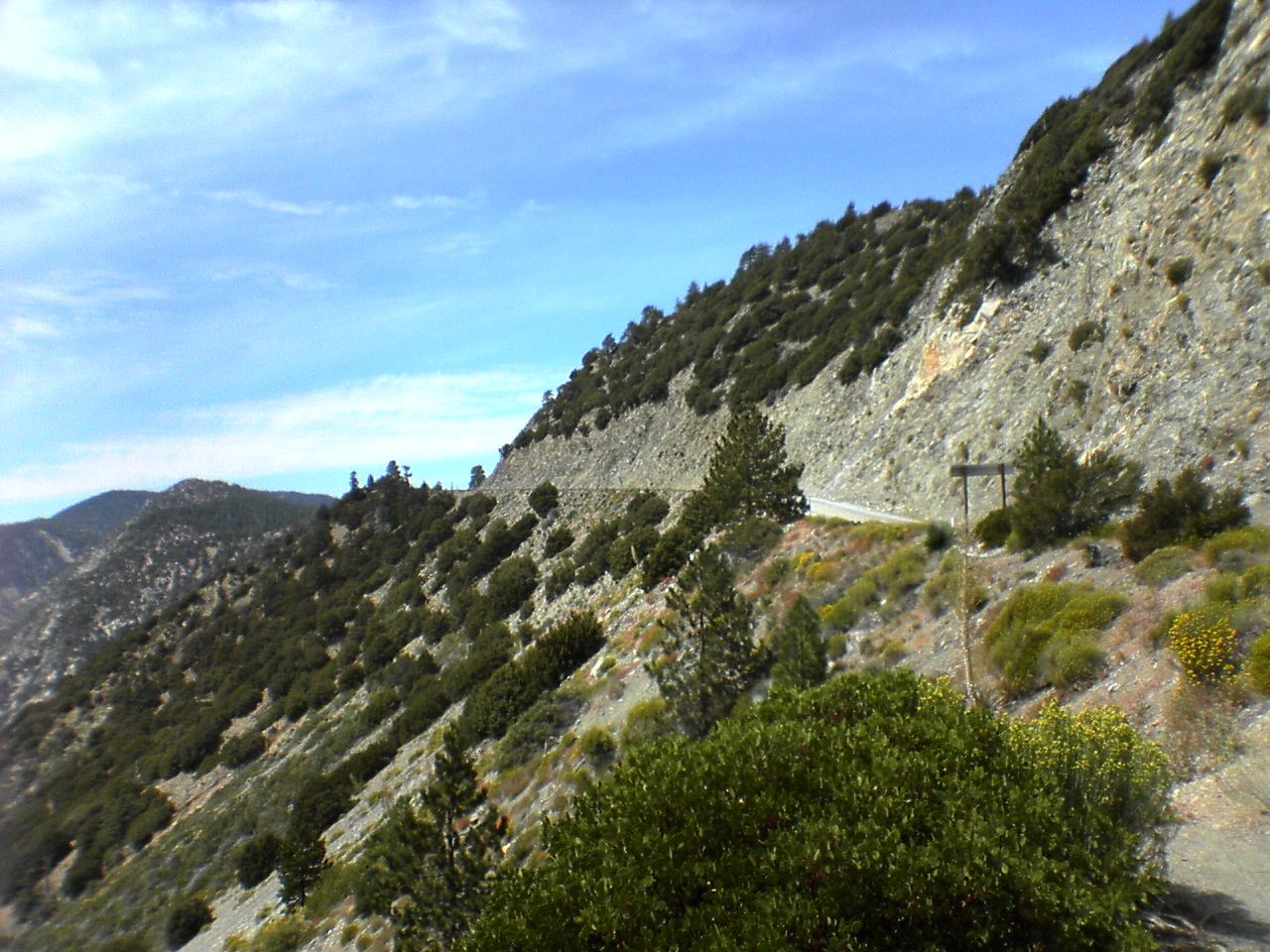
Highway 2 through the San Gabriel Mountains

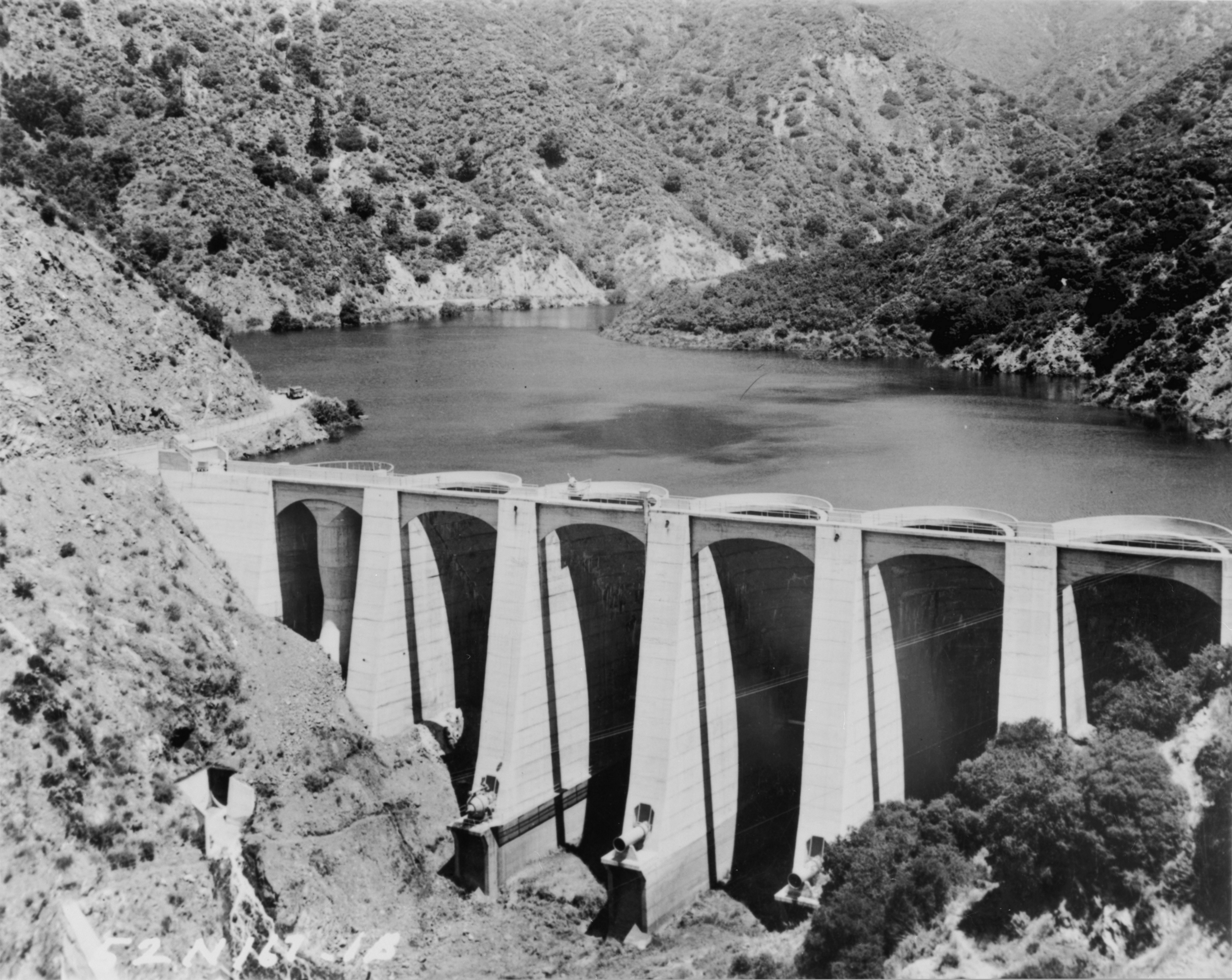
Big Dalton Dam near full capacity

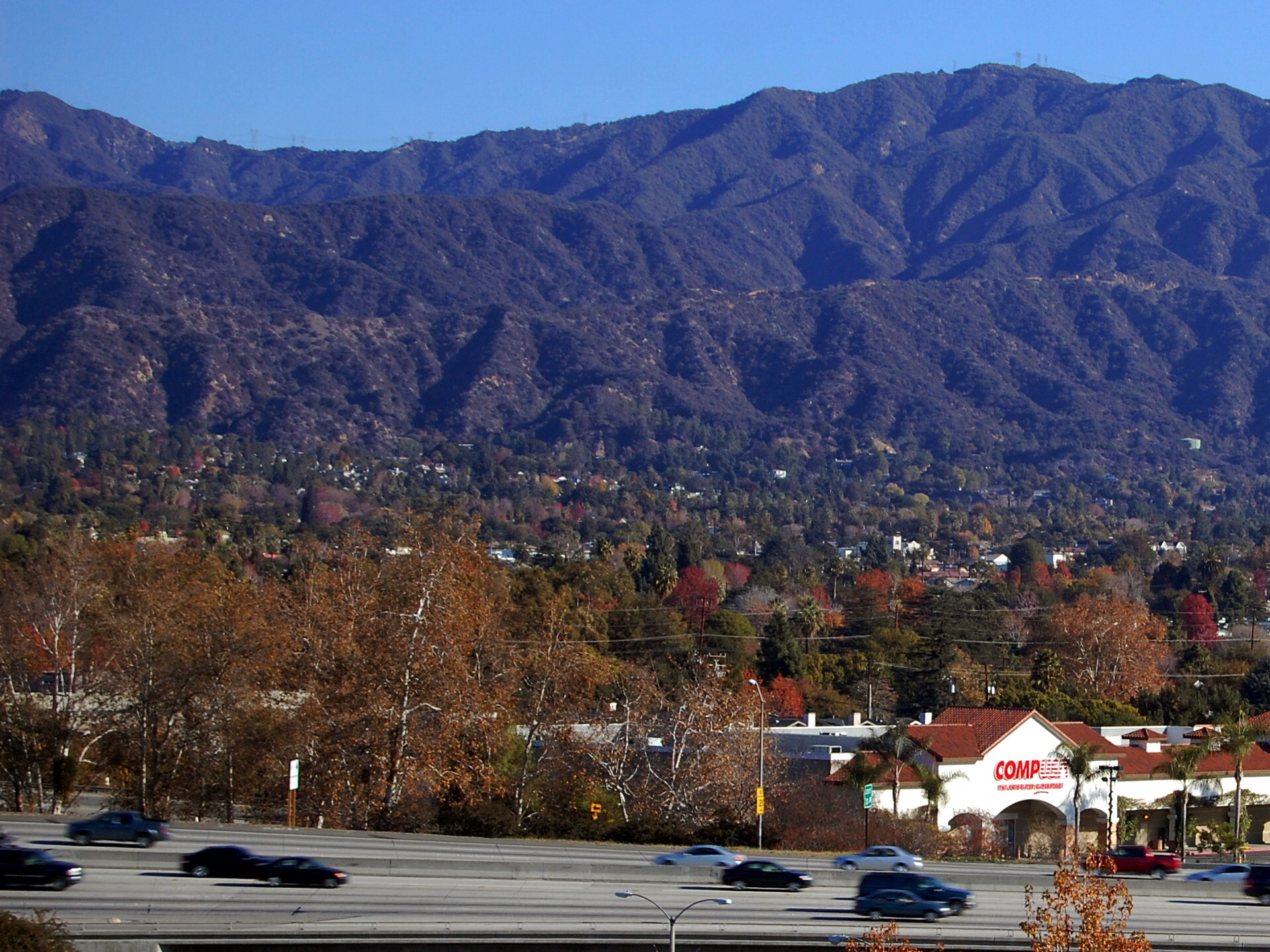
Monrovia and the San Gabriel Mountains

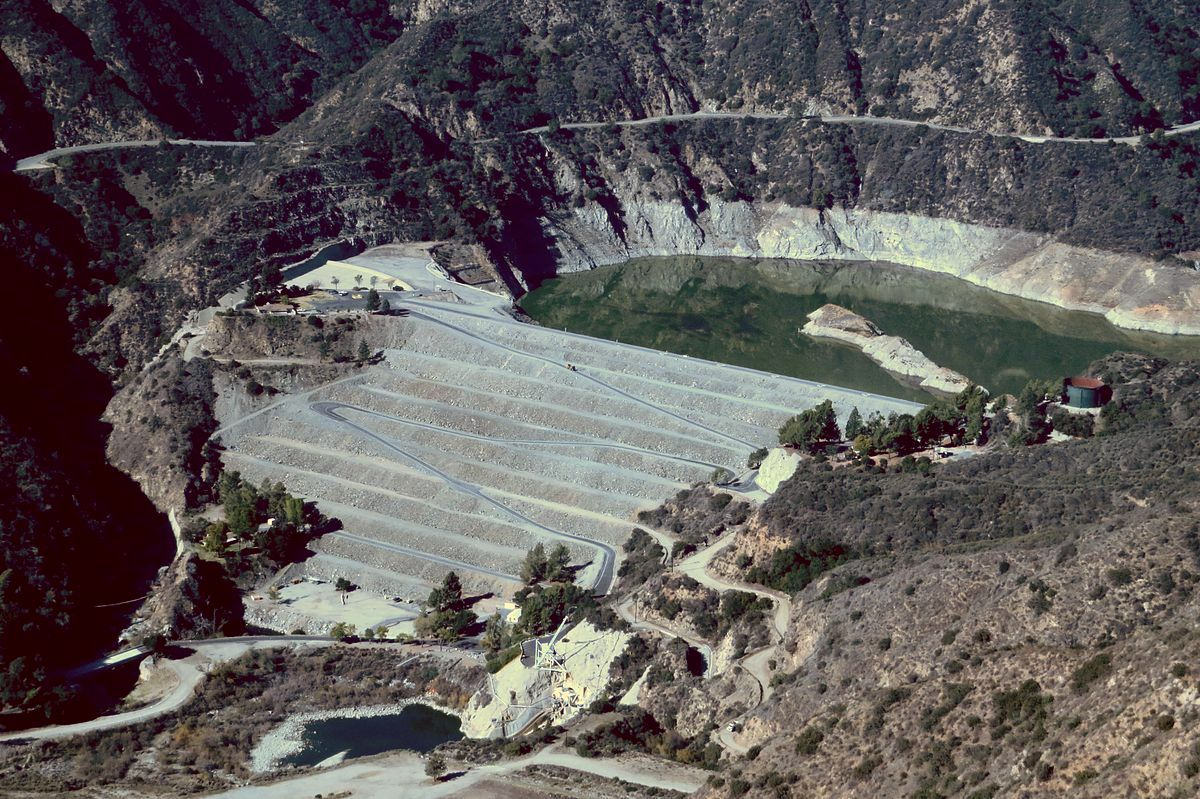
San Gabriel Dam

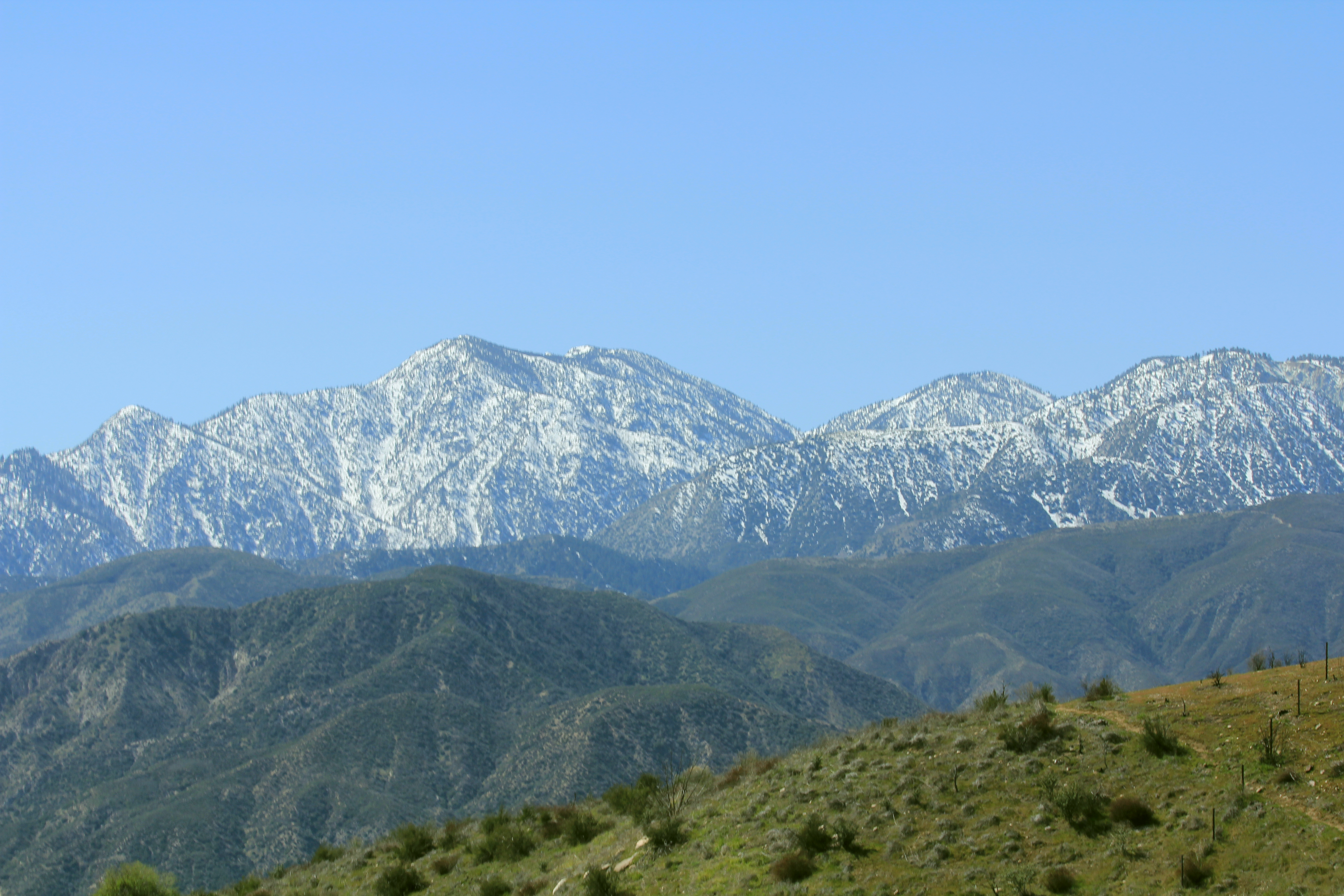
San Gabriel Mountains from Cajon Pass

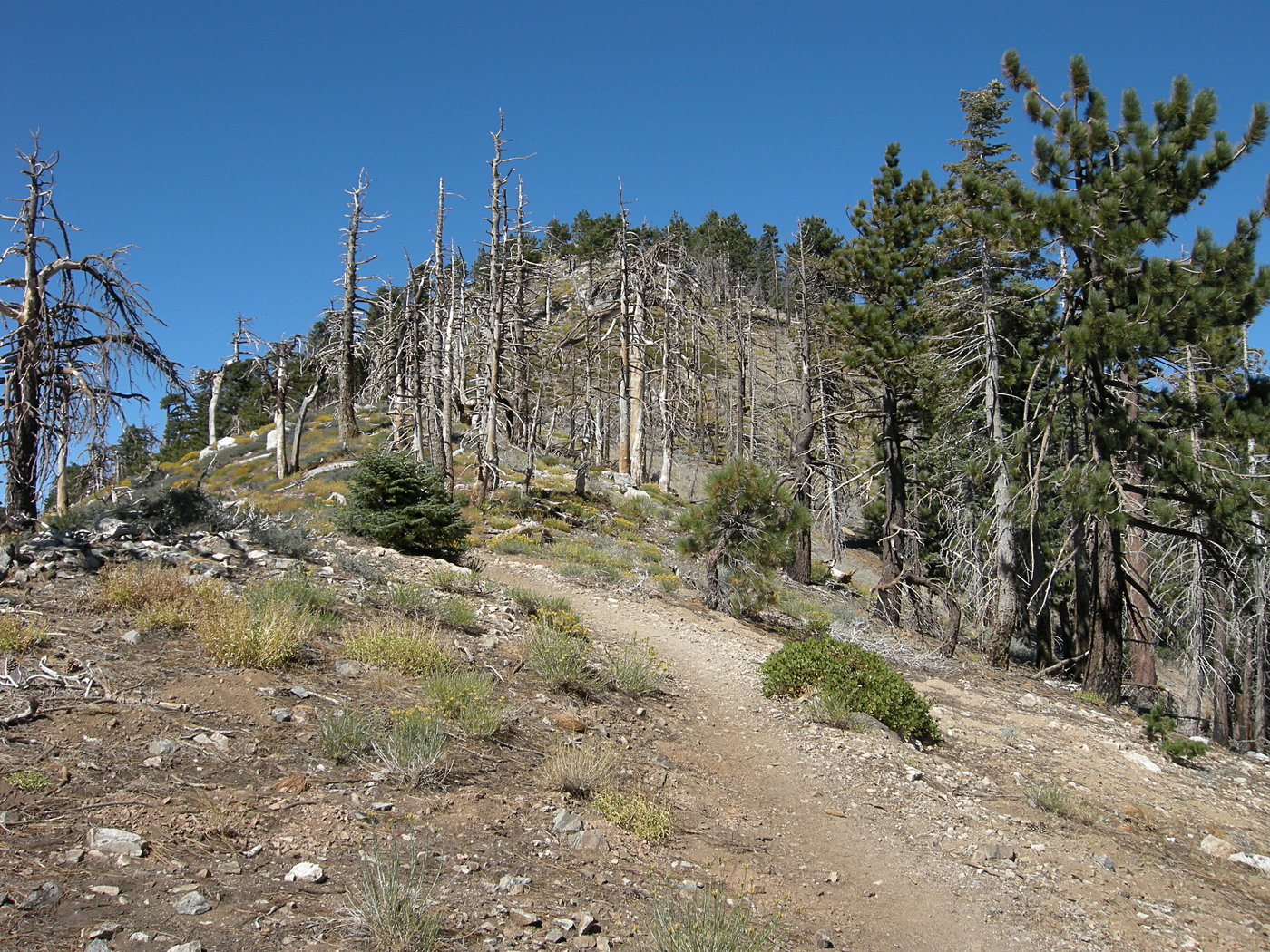
Mount Islip

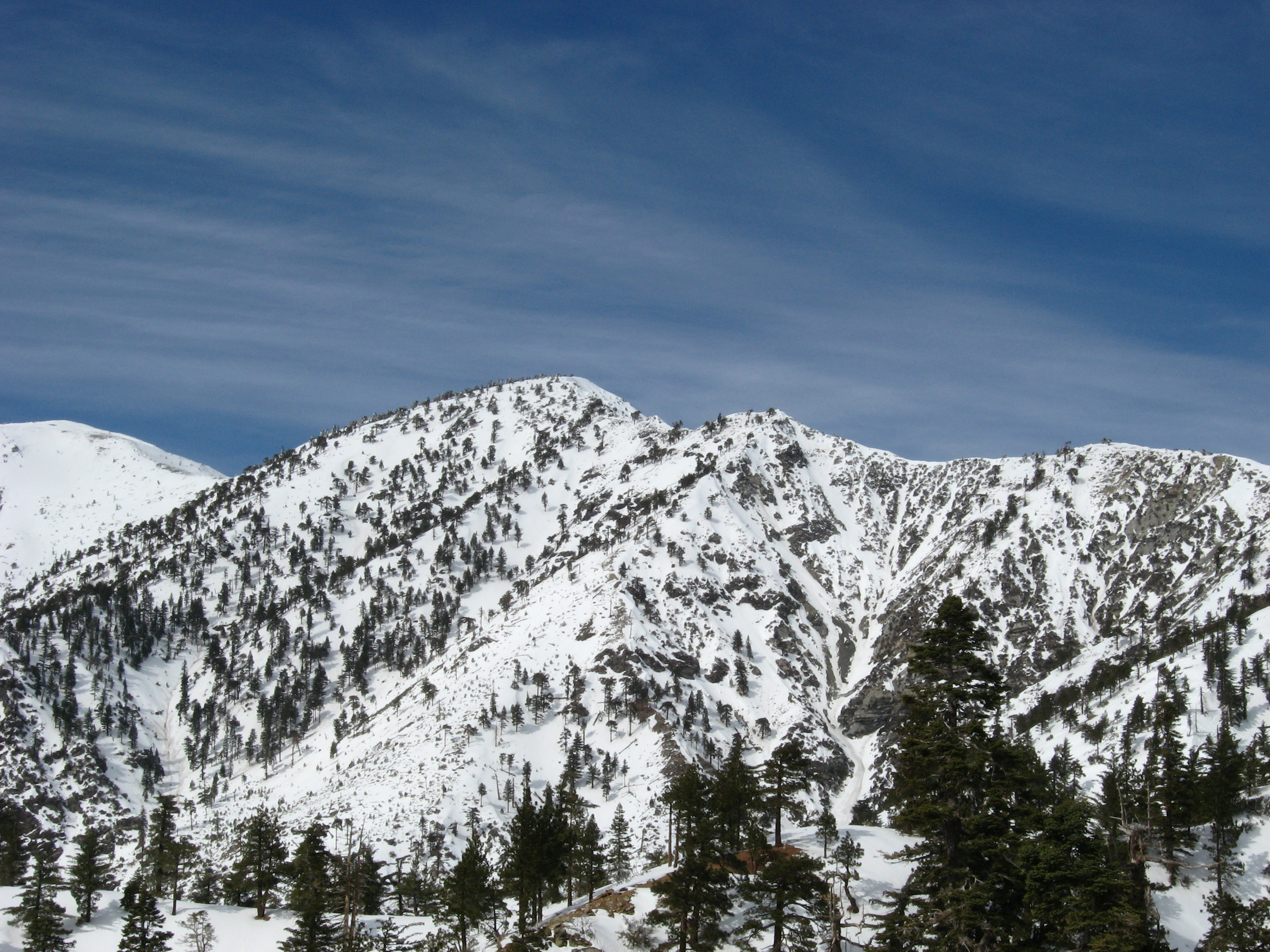
Snowpack

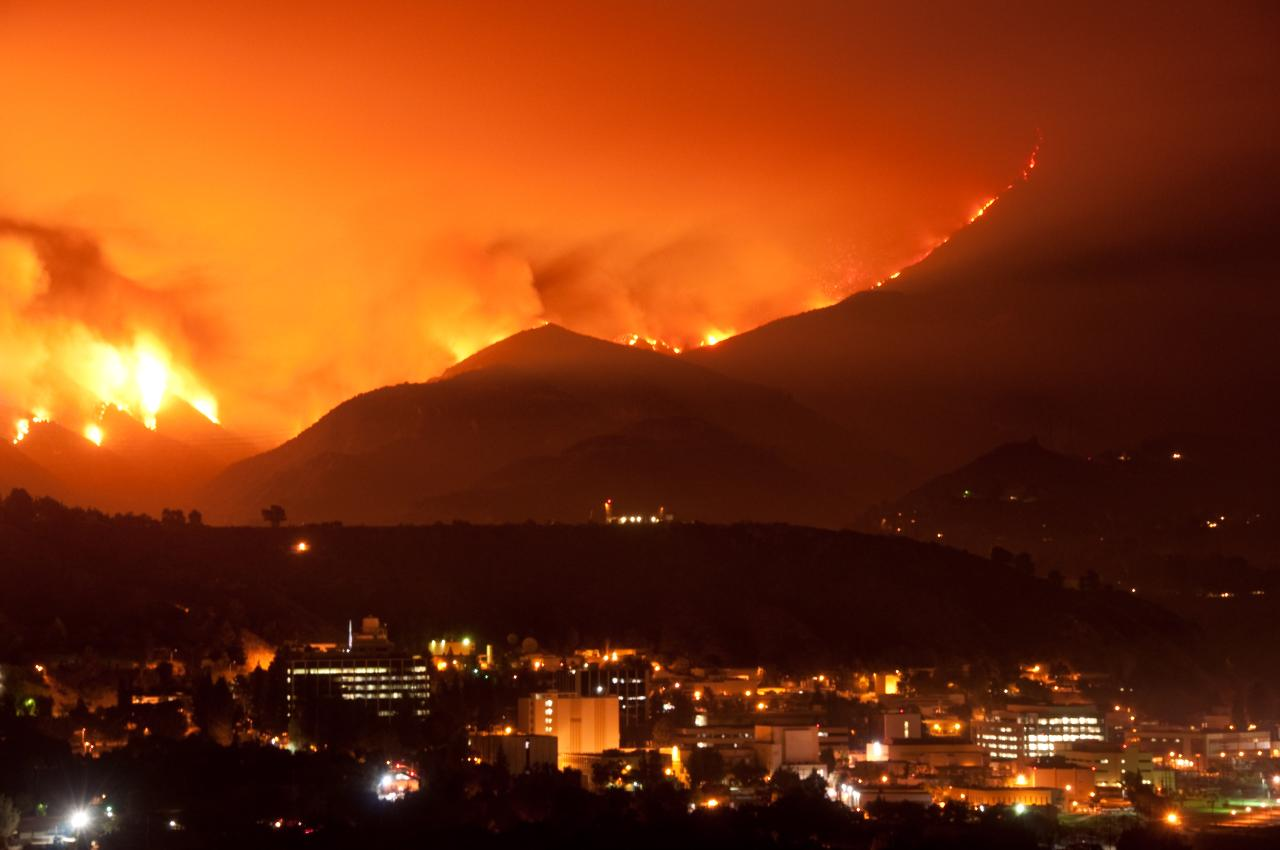
Wildfire

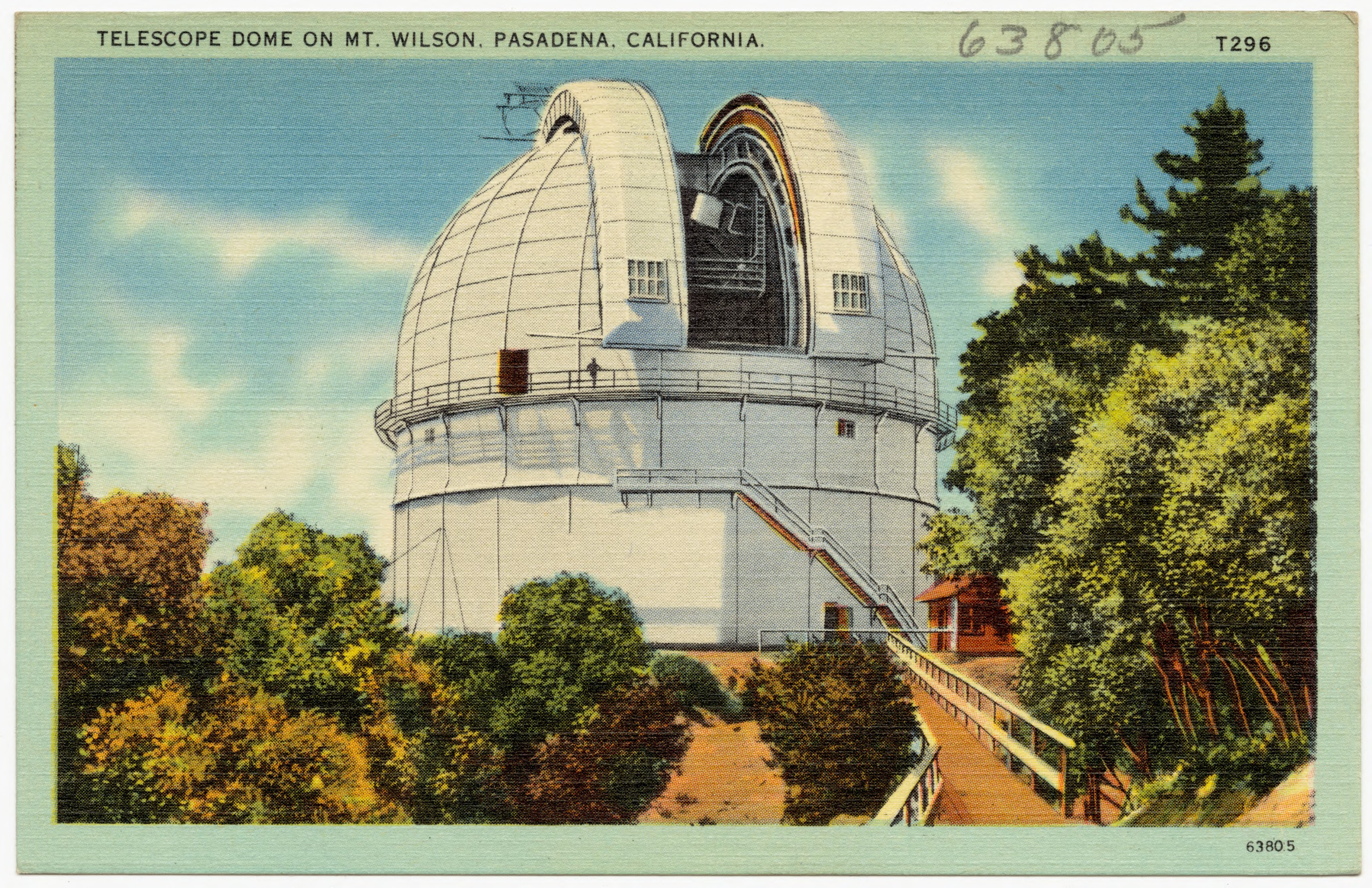
Mount Wilson Observatory

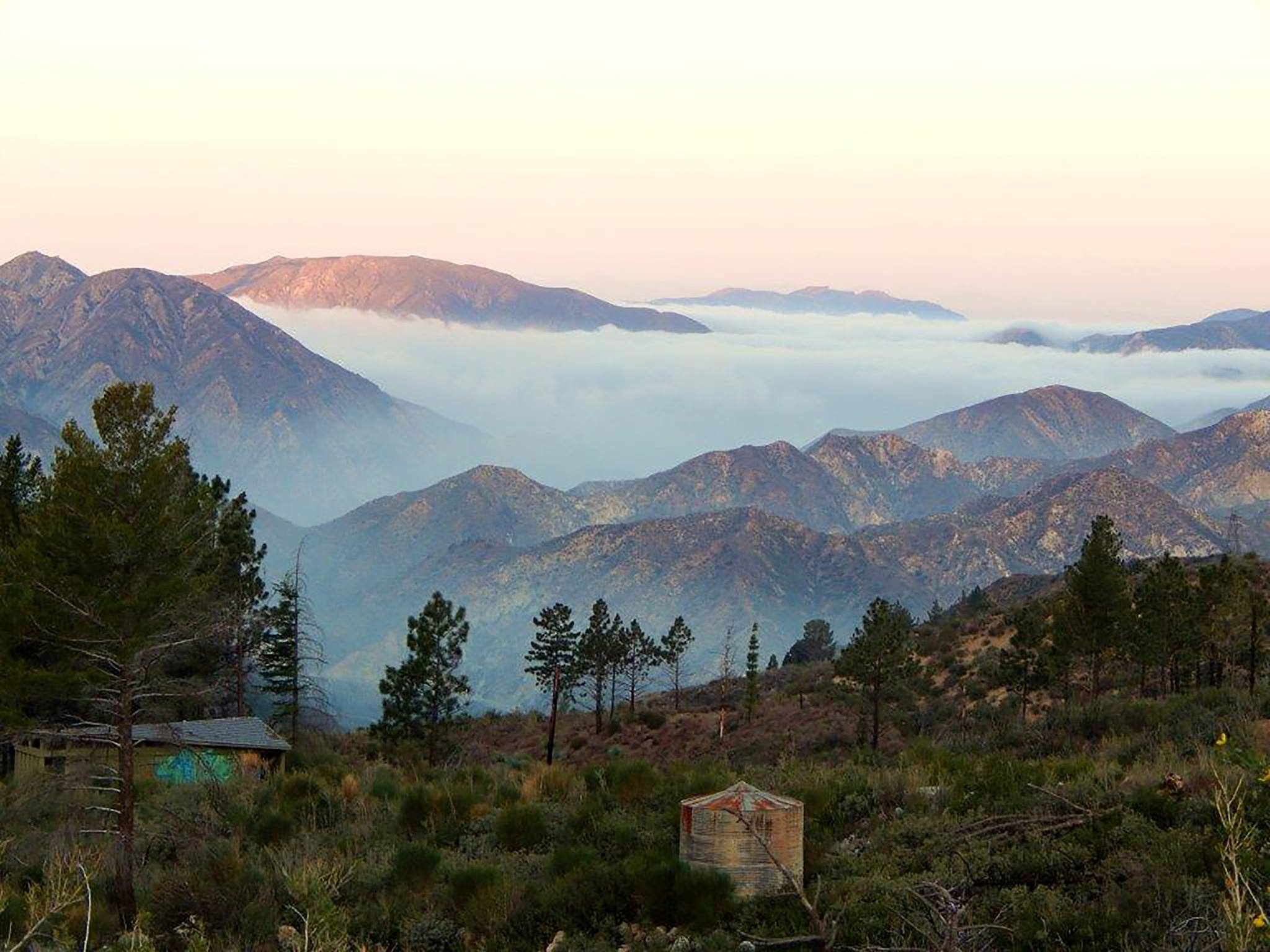
Angeles National Forest
