= Telegraph Peak (California) =

Mountain in the San Gabriel Mountains of California

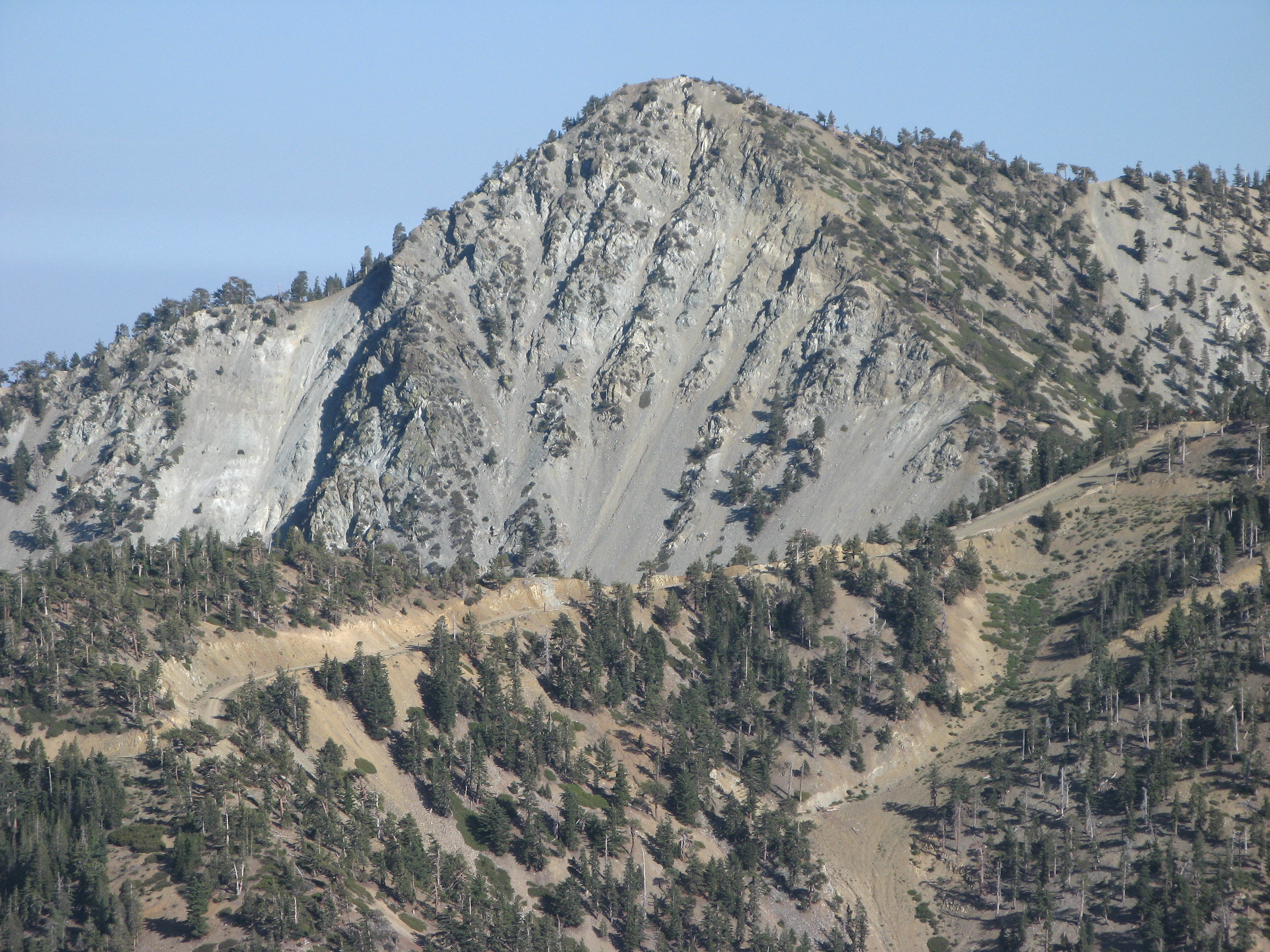
- Telegraph Peak as seen from Devils Backbone ridge on Mount San Antonio.

Highest point
- Elevation: 8,989 ft (2,740 m) NAVD 88
- Prominence: 1,183 ft (361 m)
- Parent peak: Mount San Antonio
- Listing: Hundred Peaks Section
- Coordinates: 34°15′41″N 117°35′53″W

Geography
- Location: San Bernardino County, California, U.S.
- Parent range: San Gabriel Mountains
- Topo map: USGS Telegraph Peak

Climbing
- Easiest route: Hike, class 1

Telegraph Peak, is a peak of the San Gabriel Mountains, in the San Gabriel Mountains National Monument and San Bernardino County, California.

With an elevation of 8,989 feet (2,740 m), it is highest point in the Cucamonga Wilderness of the San Bernardino National Forest.

Most of the bedrock, including that of the summit, is cataclastic gneiss. Granodiorite underlies much of the southern portion.

== See also ==
- San Gabriel Mountains National Monument−related topics
