= Cucamonga Peak =

Mountain in California, United States

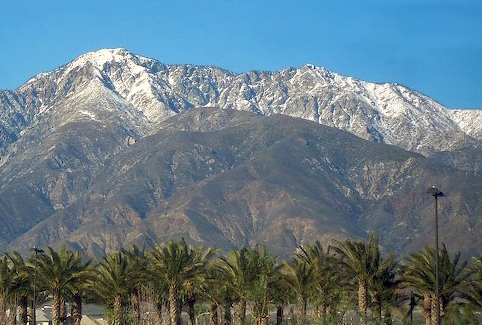
- Cucamonga Peak from Victoria Gardens, 2008.

Highest point
- Elevation: 8,862 ft (2,701 m) NAVD 88
- Prominence: 1,299 ft (396 m)
- Listing: Hundred Peaks Section
- Coordinates: 34°13′22″N 117°35′07″W

Geography
- Location: San Bernardino County, California, U.S.
- Parent range: San Gabriel Mountains
- Topo map: USGS Cucamonga Peak

Climbing
- Easiest route: Trail Hike, class 1

Cucamonga Peak is one of the highest peaks of the San Gabriel Mountains in San Bernardino County, California, with a summit elevation of 8,862 feet (2,701 m). It is within the Cucamonga Wilderness of the San Bernardino National Forest.

It is named after the 19th-century Mexican land grant, Rancho Cucamonga, that was below it.

== Geography ==
The mountain towers over the Inland Empire cities of Rancho Cucamonga, Ontario and Fontana.

The summit can be seen west of Cajon Pass on Interstate 15, the route from Southern California to Las Vegas. The peak can also be seen on extremely clear days from Mount San Jacinto 46 miles (74 km) to the southeast, Irvine 55 miles (89 km) to the south, and Santa Monica to the far west.

== Recreation ==
The most popular trail to the summit begins in Icehouse Canyon. A Forest Service trail (7W07) leads from here to Icehouse Saddle, from which the Cucamonga Peak Trail (7W04) leads to the summit. The round trip is 14 miles (23 km) long with an elevation gain of 4,300 feet (1,300 m). A wilderness permit for vehicles is required.

It is advisable to bring a warm jacket or windbreaker as there is no protection from the elements when getting close towards the summit. Snow can also be found in certain parts of the hike depending on the season.

== See also ==
- San Gabriel Mountains−related topics
- Rancho Cucamonga name — for theories of the word Cucamonga's origin.
