= Blanchard =

Blanchard is a French family name. It is also used as a given name. It derives from the Old French word blanchart which meant "whitish, bordering upon white". It is also an obsolete term for a white horse.

== Geographical distribution ==
As of 2014, 42.3% of all known bearers of the surname Blanchard were residents of France (frequency 1:1,117), 36.3% of the United States (1:7,073), 8.7% of Canada (1:3,021), 3.5% of England (1:11,189), 1.7% of Haiti (1:4,397), 1.2% of Vietnam (1:56,908) and 1.1% of Australia (1:15,892).

In France, the frequency of the surname was higher than national average (1:1,117) in the following regions:

1. Saint-Barthélemy (1:18)
2. Pays de la Loire (1:424)
3. Centre-Val de Loire (1:574)
4. French Guiana (1:677)
5. Brittany (1:690)
6. Nouvelle-Aquitaine (1:700)
7. Bourgogne-Franche-Comté (1:1,098)

In Canada, the frequency of the surname was higher than national average (1:3,021) in the following provinces:

1. New Brunswick (1:511)
2. Prince Edward Island (1:544)
3. Newfoundland and Labrador (1:1,106)
4. Quebec (1:1,693)
5. Yukon (1:1,726)

== Surname ==
Wikipedia articles about people with the surname Blanchard:

- Al Blanchard (born 1952), ice hockey right winger
- Alain Blanchard (died 1419), commander of the crossbowmen of Rouen during the Hundred Years' War
- Alana Blanchard (born 1990), American professional surfer
- Albert Gallatin Blanchard (1810–1891), American Civil War general in the Confederate Army
- Allen Blanchard (1929–2008), Australian federal politician
- Amy Ella Blanchard (1854–1926), American writer of juvenile fiction
- Angela Blanchard, American policy advisor and CEO
- Antoine Blanchard (1910–1988), French painter
- Arthur Bailly-Blanchard (1855–1925), American diplomat
- Barry Blanchard (born 1959), Canadian mountaineer and presenter
- Blanche Blanchard (1866–1959), American landscape artist from New Orleans
- Brian Blanchard (born 1958), attorney, judge in Wisconsin
- C. Lemoine Blanchard (1910–1986), served on the Los Angeles City Council from 1959 until 1963
- Cary Blanchard (1968–2016), former American football placekicker in the National Football League
- Charles A. Blanchard (1848–1925), the second president of Wheaton College in Wheaton, Illinois
- Charles A. Blanchard (lawyer) (born 1959), United States lawyer who served as general counsel of the army
- Charles V. Blanchard (1866–1939), American politician who served as a Massachusetts state representative and a Massachusetts state senator
- Claude Blanchard (1932–2006), Québécois pop singer and actor
- Dick Blanchard (born 1949), linebacker in the National Football League
- Doc Blanchard (1924–2009), American college football player and Heisman Trophy winner
- Edgar Blanchard (1924–1972), American guitarist and bandleader
- Edmond Blanchard (1954–2014), Canadian jurist and politician
- Edmund Blanchard (1824–1886), lawyer and prominent businessman in Centre County, Pennsylvania
- Édouard-Théophile Blanchard (1844–1879), nineteenth-century French painter
- Everard Eells Blanchard (1895–1971), Argentine entomologist
- Edward Litt Laman Blanchard (1820–1889), English writer best known for his contributions to the Drury Lane pantomime
- Elizabeth Blanchard (educator) (1834–1891), American educator who was the seventh president of Mount Holyoke College
- Elizabeth Blanchard (New Hampshire politician), Democratic member of the New Hampshire House of Representatives 2002–2010
- Elmer Blanchard (1927–1970), lawyer and political figure on Prince Edward Island
- Émile Blanchard (1819–1900), French zoologist
- Erin Blanchard (born 1989), American gymnast
- Esprit Antoine Blanchard (1696–1770), French baroque composer, a contemporary of Jean-Philippe Rameau
- Ethan G. Blanchard (born 2002), United States Air Force Officer
- Étienne Blanchard (1843–1918), Canadian politician
- Eugénie Blanchard (1896–2010) the world's oldest person at the time of her death on November 4, 2010
- Françoise Blanchard (1954–2013), French actress
- Francis Blanchard AC (1916–2009), the second longest-serving Director–General of the International Labour Organization
- Frank N. Blanchard (1888–1937), American herpetologist, and professor of zoology at the University of Michigan
- Gabriel Blanchard (1630–1704), known as Blanchard Le Neveu, the only son of Jacques Blanchard, born in Paris in 1630
- George S. Blanchard (1920–2006), United States Army four-star general who served as Commander in Chief
- George Washington Blanchard (1884–1964), member of the United States House of Representatives from 1933 to 1935
- Georges Maurice Jean Blanchard (1877–1954), French general in World War II
- Gerald Blanchard (born 1972), Canadian jewel thief and criminal mastermind
- Gypsy-Rose Blanchard (born 1991), American murderer
- Harry Blanchard (1929–1960), Formula One driver from Buenos Aires, Argentina
- Hiram Blanchard (1820–1874), Nova Scotia politician
- Jérôme Blanchard (born 1981), French pair skater
- J. Merrill Blanchard (1881–1914), American college football and men's basketball head coach
- Jack Blanchard (born 1942), one-half of singing duo, with Misty Morgan
- Jacques Blanchard (1600–1638), French baroque painter
- James Blanchard (born 1942), American politician and former governor of Michigan
- James Blanchard (Canadian politician) (1876–1952), farmer and political figure in Ontario
- James Blanchard (scientist), Associate Professor of Community Health Science at the University of Manitoba
- James W. Blanchard (1903–1987), American submarine commander during the Pacific War
- Jay Blanchard (born 1946), served one term as a state senator in Arizona, representing District 30 for the Democrats
- Jean-Baptiste Blanchard (after 1595–1665), French painter
- Jean-Baptiste Blanchard (1731–1797), French Jesuit and educator, one of the contemporary opponents of Rosseau
- Jean-Pierre Blanchard (1753–1809), French inventor and pioneer balloonist
- Jeremiah Blanchard (1859–1939), farmer and political figure in Prince Edward Island
- Jocelyn Blanchard (born 1972), French footballer
- John Blanchard, Canadian television director and producer
- John Blanchard, British designer and creative director
- John Blanchard (politician) (1787–1849), Whig member of the U.S. House of Representatives from Pennsylvania
- Johnny Blanchard (1933–2009), American baseball player
- Jonathan Blanchard (abolitionist) (1811–1892), pastor, educator, social reformer, abolitionist and the first president of Wheaton College
- Jonathan Blanchard (statesman) (1738–1788), American politician
- Joseph Blanchard (1704–1758), New Hampshire soldier and politician
- Jotham Blanchard (1800–1839), lawyer, newspaper editor and political figure in Nova Scotia
- Jules Blanchard (1832–1916), French sculptor
- Justin Blanchard, American actor
- Ken Blanchard (born 1939) American management expert known for The One Minute Manager
- Leo Blanchard (born 1955), former professional Canadian football offensive lineman
- Leonardo Blanchard (born 1988), Italian footballer
- Lory Blanchard (1924–2013), New Zealand rugby league footballer and coach
- Louis Raynaud, dit Blanchard (1789–1868), farmer and political figure in Lower Canada
- Lowell Blanchard (1910–1968), American radio presenter and performer
- Lynda Blanchard (born 1959), American ambassador to Slovenia
- María Blanchard (1881–1932), Spanish painter
- Marc Blanchard (died 2009), American professor of Comparative Literature and Critical Theory at the University of California, Davis
- Mari Blanchard (1927–1970), American actress
- Miriam Blanchard, Dominican politician
- Maxime Blanchard (born 1986), French football defender
- Newton C. Blanchard (1849–1922), United States Senator and Governor of Louisiana
- Nicolas Blanchard (born 1987), Canadian professional ice hockey player
- Okie Blanchard (Claire H. Blanchard) (died 1989), head football coach in 1940 at the University of Wyoming
- Olivier Blanchard (born 1948), French economist
- Paul Harwood Blanchard (1923–2011), American glider pilot and author
- Pharamond Blanchard (1805–1873), French historical subject and landscape painter
- Philippe Blanchard (born 1968), French actor-singer known as Philippe Katerine
- Porter Blanchard (1886–1973), American silversmith
- Rachel Blanchard (born 1976), Canadian actress
- Raoul Blanchard (1877–1965), French geographer
- Raphaël Blanchard (1857–1919), French zoologist
- Ray Blanchard (born 1945), Canadian sexologist famous for Blanchard's transsexualism typology
- Red Blanchard (1914–1980), American comedian and country musician
- Red Blanchard (radio personality) (1920–2011), American radio show personality in California markets
- Richard E. Blanchard Sr. (1925–2004), writer of the gospel song Fill My Cup Lord
- Ron Blanchard, Australian film and television actor
- Rowan Blanchard (born 2001), American actress
- Samuel Laman Blanchard (1804–1845), British author and journalist
- Smoke Blanchard (1915–1989), American mountaineer, climber, trekking leader, guide, world traveler, writer, Buddhist, and a truck driver
- Sophie Blanchard (1778–1819), French aeronaut and the first woman professional balloonist
- Stanislas Blanchard (1871–1949), Canadian politician and gentleman
- Steve Blanchard (December 4, 1958), stage actor best known for his musical theatre roles
- Susan Blanchard (actress) (born 1948), American actress known for her role on All My Children
- Susan Blanchard (socialite) (born 1928), known for her marriages to Henry Fonda, Michael Wager, and Richard Widmark
- Tammy Blanchard (born 1976), American actress
- Tamsin Blanchard, British fashion journalist and author
- Terence Blanchard (born 1962), American trumpeter, pianist and composer
- Théotime Blanchard (1844–1911), teacher, farmer, merchant and politician in New Brunswick, Canada
- Thomas Blanchard (inventor) (1788–1864), American inventor who pioneered interchangeable parts
- Tim Blanchard (born 1987), Australian championship-winning motor racing driver
- Tom Blanchard (born 1948), former American football punter
- Tully Blanchard (born 1954), American professional wrestler
- Valentine Blanchard (1831–1901), Victorian photographer
- Vaughn Blanchard (1889–1969), American track and field athlete who competed in the 1912 Summer Olympics
- William Blanchard (comedian) (1769–1835), English comedian
- William H. Blanchard (1916–1966), United States Air Force officer
- William Isaac Blanchard (died 1790), stenographer

== Given name ==
Wikipedia articles about people with the given name Blanchard:

- Alva Blanchard Adams (1875–1941), Democratic politician who represented Colorado in the United States Senate
- Azariel Blanchard Miller (1878–1941), an American farmer, rancher, and developer
- Blanchard Montgomery (born 1961), a retired American football linebacker
- Blanchard Ryan (born 1967), an American actress
- Carla Blanchard Dartez (born 1965), a Democratic former member of the Louisiana House of Representatives from District 51
- Carolyn Blanchard Allen (1921–2018), American politician
- Clark Blanchard Millikan (1903–1966), a distinguished professor of aeronautics at the California Institute of Technology (Caltech)
- Fleming Blanchard McCurdy, PC (1875–1952), a Canadian politician
- Forrester Blanchard Washington (1887–1963), the first of four children born to John Washington and Lucy Wily Washington in 1887
- Graves Blanchard Erskine (1897–1973), United States Marine Corps officer in World War II
- Kempster Blanchard Miller (1870–1933), an American engineer, author, and businessman
- Lafayette Blanchard Gleason (1863–1937), the Secretary of the Republican State Committee from 1906 to 1937
- Louise Blanchard Bethune (1856–1913), the first American woman known to have worked as a professional architect
- Maurice Blanchard Cohill Jr. (1929–2022), United States federal judge
- Serge Blanchard Oba, a Congolese politician
- Thomas Blanchard Stowell (1846–1927), a distinguished American educator
- Victor Blanchard Scheffer (1906–2011), a prominent American mammalogist and the author of eleven books relating to naturalism
- William Blanchard Jerrold (1826–1884), an English journalist and author

== See also ==
- Blanshard (disambiguation)
- Governor Blanchard (disambiguation)
- Murder of Dee Dee Blanchard
