= Rosena =

Rosena may refer to:

- Rosena, California the original name of the city of Fontana, California
- Rosena, Virginia, an unincorporated community in Albemarle County, Virginia, United States
- Rosena Allin-Khan (born c. 1976), English medical doctor, Labour Member of Parliament (MP) for Tooting since June 2016
- Rosena Brown (born c. 1945), Irish actress from Belfast, and intelligence officer for the Provisional IRA
