= James Blanchard (disambiguation) =

James J. Blanchard (born 1942) is an American politician and former diplomat.

James Blanchard may also refer to:

- James Blanchard (scientist), Canadian physician and professor
- James Blanchard (Canadian politician) (1876–1952), politician in Ontario, Canada
- James U. Blanchard III (1943–1999), American dealer in coins and rare metals
- James W. Blanchard (1903–1987), American submarine commander in the Pacific during World War II
