= Ruth Miller (artist) =

American artist

- Born: Ruth Blanchard Miller; January 17, 1904; Chicago, Illinois, U.S.
- Died: May 21, 1978 (aged 74); Santa Barbara, California U.S.
- Other names: Ruth Miller Kempster, Ruth Blanchard Miller Kempster
- Education: Kansas City Art Institute, Stickney Memorial Art School, Otis Art Institute, Art Students League of New York
- Known for: Painting

Medal record

Art competitions

Representing United States

Olympic Games
Silver medal – second place	1932 Los Angeles	Paintings

Ruth Blanchard Miller, also known as Ruth Miller Kempster, Ruth Blanchard Miller Kempster (January 17, 1904 – May 21, 1978) was an American artist.

== Biography ==
Miller was born to Kempster Blanchard Miller and Antha (Knowlton) Miller in Chicago, Illinois. Her uncle was Azariel Blanchard Miller, founder of the city of Fontana, California.

Miller began her studies with a correspondence course from the Kansas City Art Institute. She continued her studies at the Stickney Memorial Art School in Pasadena, California, with more classes at the Otis Art Institute in Los Angeles. Miller studied sculpture, painting, and lithography at the Art Students League of New York as well as École des Beaux-Arts in Paris.

She then left Paris because École des Beaux-Arts did not allow unmarried female students to work with nude models and consequently moved to Florence, where she studied fresco techniques. Miller moved back to California and married Henry Fracker; she began working as a realist painting under the name "Ruth Miller Fracker".

In the 1930s, Miller taught art in Pasadena at the School of Fine Arts. At the 1932 Los Angeles Olympics, she won a silver medal in art for her painting "Struggle".

Miller divorced her husband in 1954 and took her father’s first name "Kempster", working as "Ruth Miller Kempster". Her first solo exhibition premiered at the Pasadena Art Institute in 1953. Although she continued to work until her death in 1978, her last public exhibition occurred in 1958.

Miller died on May 21, 1978, in Santa Barbara, California, at the age of 74.
