= Jean-Baptiste Blanchard (painter) =

French painter

Jean-Baptiste Blanchard (after 1595 – 5 April 1665) was a French painter.

== Life ==
His father was from Condrieu in the Lyonnais and had come to Paris as a deputy for his town. There he lodged with the painter Boleri or Baullery, whose daughter he married. They had three sons, Jean-Baptiste, Jacques (1600–1638), Pierre and a daughter. Jean-Baptiste and Jacques were both apprenticed to their maternal uncle Nicolas Baullery. Jean-Baptiste also stayed with the painter Horace Le Blanc in Lyon before accompanying Jacques to Italy, where they set out for Rome in October 1624 and moved to Venice in 1626. Jacques returned to France in 1628 whilst his brother stayed there until 1634. Jean-Baptiste's nephew Louis-Gabriel Blanchard (1630–1704) was born during his absence — he later became a painter and treasurer of the Académie royale de peinture et de sculpture.

In 1637, Jean-Baptiste became painter to the king and he was received into the Académie royale in 1663. He was one of the artists to work on the Louvre in 1656 and appeared on the royal accounts from 1644 to 1652 alongside René Nourrisson and François Garnier. He died at home on Rue Saint-Antoine in Paris on 5 April 1665 and was buried the following day in the parish of Saint-Paul in Paris.

=== Prints ===
- undated: Bohemians or beggars standing among ruins, print
- c. 1640: Madonna and Child with Saint John the Baptist and Saint Simeon, after the painting

=== Paintings ===
- 1640: Madonna and Child with Saint John the Baptist and Saint Simeon, Paris, Louvre (acquired in 1947)
- 1656: Il travaille à la décoration du Louvre
- XVII century: Les Bohémiens or Gueux dans la ruine Valence, Musée de Valence
