= Blanshard =

Blanshard may refer to:

Places:

- Blanshard, Manitoba, rural municipality in the province of Manitoba in Western Canada
- Blanshard Peak, distinctive rock pinnacle in Golden Ears Provincial Park
- Blanshard Street, arterial road in Victoria, British Columbia

Given name:

- Blanshard Stamp QC (1905–1984), English lawyer, a Lord Justice of Appeal and a member of the Privy Council
- Harry Blanshard Wood VC MM (1882–1924), English recipient of the Victoria Cross

Surname:

- Brand Blanshard (1892–1987), American philosopher known primarily for his defense of reason
- Paul Blanshard (1892–1980), controversial author, lawyer, Humanist, and outspoken critic of Catholicism
- Richard Blanshard MA (1817–1894), English barrister, first governor of the Colony of Vancouver Island from 1849 to 1851

== See also ==
- Blanchard
