= Kempster Blanchard Miller =

19th-20th century American engineer and businessman

- Born: August 14, 1870; Boston, Massachusetts, U.S.
- Died: November 22, 1933 (aged 63); Pasadena, California, U.S.

Kempster Blanchard Miller (August 14, 1870 – November 22, 1933) was an American engineer, author, and businessman. He is known for his many writings in the field of electrical engineering, electrical design, and the early telephone industry. His best known work was American Telephone Practice, considered for many years to be the seminal textbook on early telephone design and function.

== Personal life ==
Miller was born in Boston, Massachusetts, to Joseph Kempster Miller and Eliza (Blanchard) Miller, he spent his childhood in Washington, D.C., before earning his engineering degree from Cornell University in 1893. In 1897 he married Antha Knowlton, and they had three daughters, Dorothea, Antha, and Ruth.

== Notable Family Members ==
Daughter Ruth Miller, also known as Ruth Kempster and Ruth Blanchard Miller, was a distinguished artist whose work was exhibited (and won a silver medal) in the 1932 Olympics.

His brother was businessman, rancher and citrus farmer Azariel Blanchard Miller (1878–1941), founder of the city of Fontana, California.

== Career ==
After graduating from Cornell, Miller worked for a time in the US Patent Office as an examiner. In 1897, he found employment at Westinghouse Electric and Manufacturing, but left after only months to work as an electrical engineer for the Western Telephone Construction Company in Chicago as chief electrician. Starting in 1898, he began a career as book author in telephony and telegraphy, and contributing and editing correspondence school text books. In 1899, he published his seminal work American Telephone Practice, and became electrical engineer at the Kellogg Switchboard & Supply Company, quickly ascending to lead the experimental shop and laboratory. At Kellogg he was an unwitting accomplice to the secret takeover by the Bell Telephone Company, reversed after a lawsuit by the company's founder, Milo G. Kellogg. He then formed an engineering consulting firm with Samuel G. McMeen in 1904 in Chicago, Illinois, a partnership he maintained until 1919, when he became manager of the North Electric Manufacturing Company. After 1922, he returned to consulting and wrote numerous papers and treatise in telephony technology.

=== American Telephone Practice ===
In 1899, the American Electrician Company published Miller's book, American Telephone Practice. At 458 pages including many dozens of illustrations, it detailed nearly everything known about telephone technology at the time. Two more editions followed within one year in 1900. In 1905, a final edition, the fourth, was published by McGraw-Hill Book Company. The edition, "enlarged and entirely rewritten", grew to 888 pages.

== Philanthropy ==
Credited in 1928, along with F.R. Welles and Charles A. Brown, with donating 100 acres of land that would become Pilot Butte State Scenic View in Bend, Oregon.

== Death ==
Miller died on November 22, 1933, in Pasadena, California, at the age of 63.
