= Michel Rochetel =

French painter

Michel Rochetel (French pronunciation: [miʃɛl ʁɔʃtɛl]; active 1540 to 1552) was a French painter active at Fontainebleau Palace after 1540. He worked in the studio of Francesco Primaticcio and used that artist's drawings to paint 'Zaleucos' and 'Justice' on cupboards in the king's cabinet between 1541 and 1545. He was also one of the artists who used Primaticcio's drawings to design images of the apostles for enamels by Léonard Limosin (1547). He was paid 20 livres for his work on the galerie d'Ulysse - a salary of that amount placed him among the top painters in France. He was received as a master painter on 9 September 1551 and had a studio and pupils, including Jérôme Bollery. He is recorded as sick in 1549 and the last mention of him in the written record dates to 1552. A drawing of Ceres by him (Kupferstich Kabinett, Dresden), signed and dated 1551, shows Primaticcio's and Gianfrancesco Penni's influence. Another version of it is in the Morgan Library and Museum.
