= Jérôme Bollery =

French painter

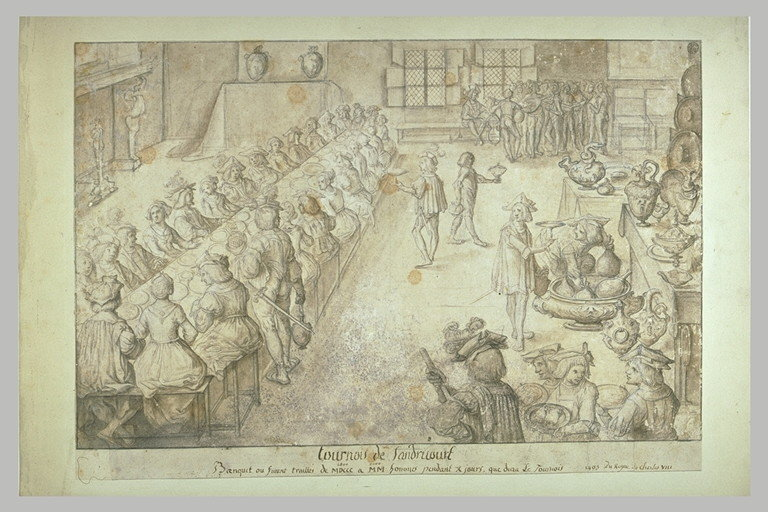
Banquet Pas d'armes de Sandricourt by Jérôme Baullery

Jérôme Baullery or Bollery (c. 1532–1598) was a French painter.

== Life ==
The son of the organ maker Pasquier Baullery, he joined Michel Rochetel's studio in 1552 and was made a master of the corporation of painters shortly afterwards. He died in Paris and is often cited by chroniclers of the 17th century such as André Félibien et Florent Le Comte as one of the artists active at the end of the 16th century or the start of the reign of Henry IV of France. The Louvre holds eight drawings attributed to Jérôme or his son Nicolas entitled The Feats of Arms at Sandricourt or The Tourney at Sandricourt, a tournament hosted on Louis d'Hédouville's estate at Amblainville between 16 and 20 September 1493 and which involved over 4,000 people.
