= U.S. Rabbit Experimental Station =

California Historic Landmark

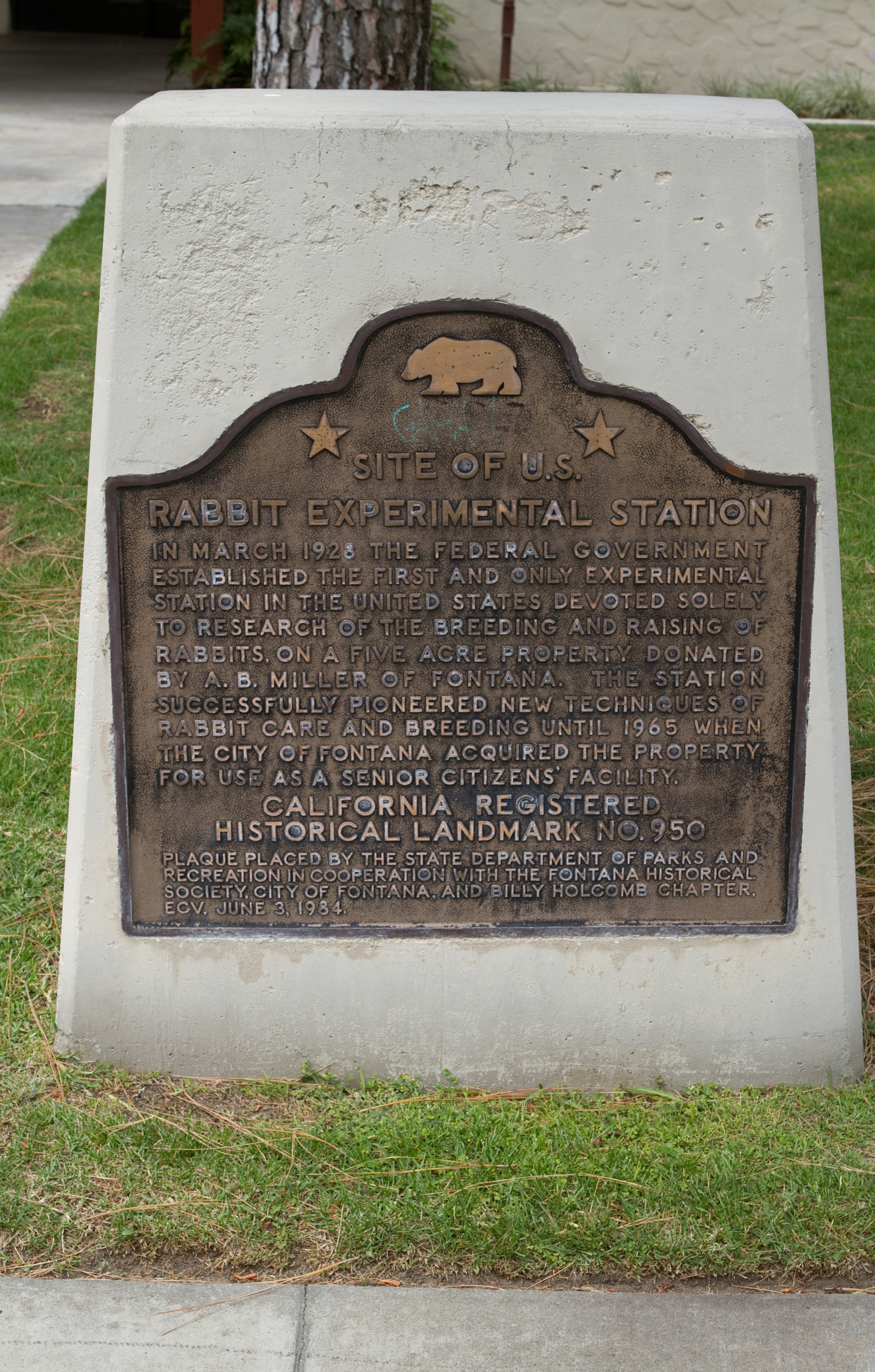
- U.S. Rabbit Experimental Station plaque

- Location within California
- 34°06′05″N 117°26′40″W
- Location: Fontana, California

History
- Built: 1928

Site notes
- Area: 5 acres (2.0 ha)

California Historical Landmark
- Designated: June 9, 1982
- Reference no.: 950

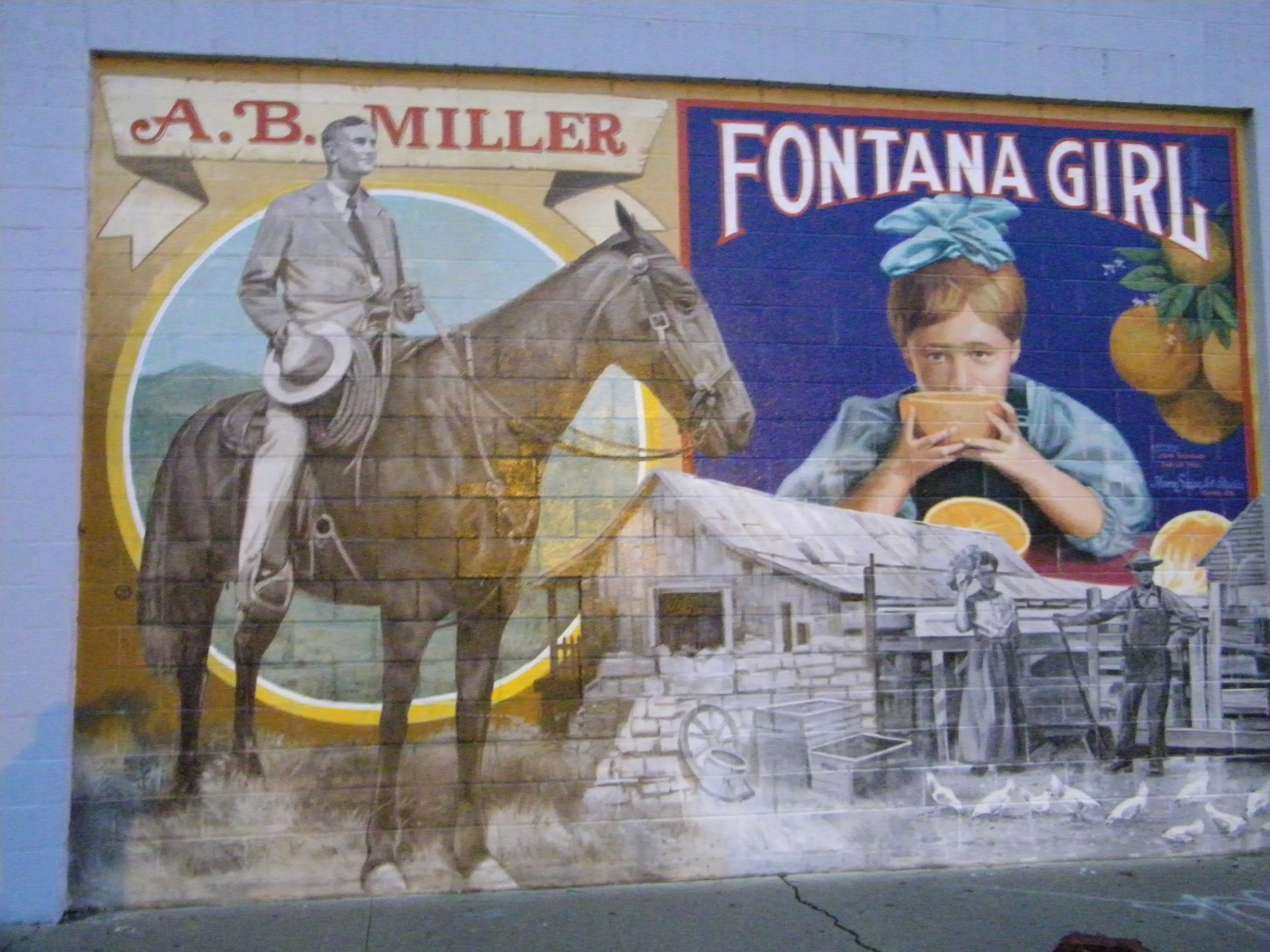
A.B. Miller on horseback as depicted in an outdoor mural in downtown Fontana, California

The U.S. Rabbit Experimental Station was the first and only facility in the United States set aside for the study of breeding and raising of rabbits. Started in 1928, in Fontana, California the station studied rabbits until it closed in 1965. The U.S. Rabbit Experimental Station was designated a California Historic Landmark (No.950) on June 9, 1982. A marker was placed in Fontana at the site. The station was built on land donated by A. B. Miller, the founder of Fontana. The five-acre (2.0 ha) property in Fontana developed procedures for rabbit care and breeding. The City of Fontana purchased the property and turned it into a senior citizens' facility in 1965.

== Azariel Blanchard Miller ==
Azariel Blanchard Miller (1878–1941) is the founder of the city of Fontana. In 1905, he brought 200 head of horse, mules, plows, scrapers and tents into the area and began transforming 17,000 acres (6,900 ha) of sand, sagebrush and rock into a citrus fruit, poultry and livestock farm. Miller called his ranch Rosena. The town was renamed Fontana in 1913.)

== Marker ==
The marker at the Josephine Knoph Senior Citizen Center of Fontana at 8384 Cypress Ave., Fontana site reads:

- In March 1928, the Federal Government established the first and only experimental station in the United States devoted solely to research on the breeding and raising of rabbits on a five-acre property donated by A. B. Miller of Fontana. The station successfully pioneered new techniques of rabbit care and breeding until 1965 when the City of Fontana acquired the property for use as a senior citizens facility. Erected 1984 by Department of Parks and Recreation in cooperation with the Fontana Historical Society, the City of Fontana, and the Billy Holcomb Chapter, ECV. (Marker Number 950.)

== See also ==
- California Historical Landmarks in San Bernardino County, California
