= Paul Blanchard =

English flying instructor and author

Paul Harwood Blanchard (24 December 1923 in Cleveland, Ohio – 22 June 2011 in Chinnor, Oxfordshire, UK) was one of the early flying instructors of the Cambridge University Gliding Club (1947–49) and author of Elementary Gliding – A Pupil's Manual.

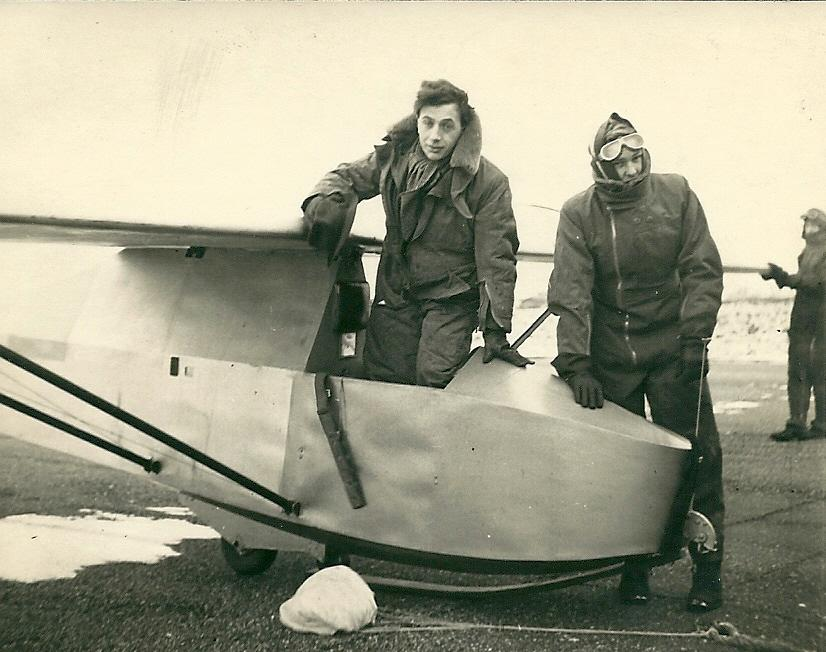
Paul Blanchard in a Slingsby Kirby Tutor

Blanchard graduated in Natural Sciences from St John's College in 1948, becoming Chief Flying Instructor (CFI) in his third undergraduate year.

== Elementary Gliding ==
Blanchard wrote the first version of Elementary Gliding and offered it to the BGA and the Surrey Gliding Club, however they were not interested in marketing it. He subsequently asked the CUGC to produce and distribute it. The result was a duplicated "Second Edition", dated February 1952, "compiled by P.H. Blanchard", with technical drawings by Roger Austin and cartoons by Pete Sullivan, both CUGC members. It incorporated improvements made by other Club members as well, particularly Ken Machin (later CFI). The next edition no longer carried Blanchard's name, just that of the publisher, "Cambridge University Gliding Club".

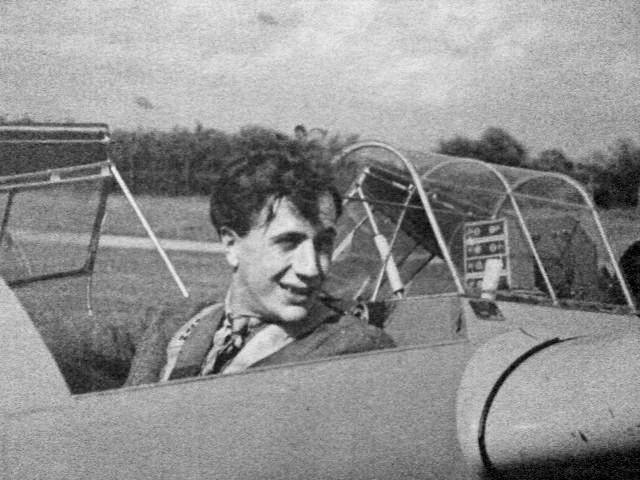
Paul Blanchard c. 1948

In 1955, a printed version of the manual appeared, published by Thermal Equipment Ltd, and since 1958 subsequent editions have been published by the BGA, all under the original author's name. Philip Wills wrote an introduction referring to Paul Blanchard as having been "Chief Instructor of the Surrey Gliding Club", however later editions stopped acknowledging Austin and Sullivan as part of the CUGC. Bluebell (CUGC's T21) remained immortalised in the cover, complete with the former cement works chimney nearby. The CUGC archive contains Ken Machin's copy of the first printed edition autographed by the author: "With best wishes from Paul".

Apart from the illustrations, the major CUGC input to Elementary Gliding was the idea of a square circuit, opposing the prevailing practice of loitering while flying towards the airfield, until arriving in position for the final approach.

CUGC developed square-circuit training and improved airbrakes in response to the introduction of dual ab initio instruction in Bluebell (1950).

== Career ==
Paul Blanchard, following his father, worked initially for Tate & Lyle in London, then settled in the broader industrial chemical manufacturing industry based in the USA. He authored a book describing key elements of Corn starch production (Technology of Corn Wet Milling and Associated Processes, ISBN 978-0444882554) which remains the authority on the subject.

== Personal ==
Paul Blanchard married Barbara Ruth Horder at Croydon in the early summer of 1953. The couple had four children.
