= Elizabeth Blanchard (New Hampshire politician) =

American politician

Member of the New Hampshire House of Representatives from the Merrimack 10th district
- In office 2002 - 2010

Personal details
- Party: Democratic
- Profession: educator

Elizabeth D. Blanchard was a Democratic member of the New Hampshire House of Representatives, representing the Merrimack 10th District from 2002 to 2010.
