= Marc Blanchard =

American academic (1942–2009)

Marc Blanchard (12 October 1942 – 8 November 2009) was a professor of Comparative Literature and Critical Theory at the University of California, Davis.

He was born in 1942 to a French father and French Jewish mother who were fleeing Nazi persecution and was brought up in Argentina and Egypt. The family returned to Paris after the war, where he earned a degree at the Sorbonne in 1965, in Agrégation de lettres classiques (Romance Languages, Comparative Literature, and Classics-“Sciences Humaines”).

Prior to joining the University of California campus in 1971, Blanchard taught at Yale and Columbia. Though he was trained as a classics scholar, Blanchard's longstanding research interests were in Semiotics and the Critique of Culture.

His articles and books included: La Révolution et les Mots, Description: Sign, Self, Desire: Critical Theory in the Wake of Semiotics, In Search of the City and Trois portraits de Montaigne. He published more than seventy articles in major journals on topics of Theory, European, Latin American, Caribbean and especially Cuban Literature.

He lectured at New York University (NYU), CCNY, UNC Chapel Hill, Stanford, Ruhr University Bochum, Germany and received a Guggenheim Fellowship in 1985.

Blanchard also ran a study abroad course in Cuba, one of the few programs in the United States that did so at the time. Blanchard and Raquel Scherr created and taught a program entitled Americans in Paris, a month-long program in Paris run through the UC Davis Summer Abroad program. The program educated hundreds of students and was last taught by Blanchard/Scherr in 2008.

Marc Blanchard died on November 8, 2009, after a long battle with cancer. He was married with one daughter.
