= William Isaac Blanchard =

English stenographer

William Isaac Blanchard (died 1796) was an English stenographer.

== Biography ==
Blanchard was the grandson of a French refugee, who resided in England. He became a professional shorthand writer, and practised his art in Westminster Hall from 1767 till his death in 1796. His offices were at 4 Dean Street, Fetter Lane, and 10 Clifford's Inn.

== Works ==
Blanchard was the inventor of two separate and distinct systems of stenography, the first of which he published under the title of A Complete System of Shorthand. This was followed by the explanation of a more elaborate system in The Complete Instructor of Shorthand. The method of stenography described in the second work was hardly practised, if praised in the Historical Account of Shorthand, under the name of James Henry Lewis. Several trials taken in shorthand by Blanchard were published between 1775 and 1791, including the trials of Admiral Keppel and John Horne Tooke.
