= Everard Blanchard =

Everard Eells Blanchard
- Born: December 16, 1895; Buenos Aires, Argentina
- Died: November 24, 1971 (aged 75)
- Education: University of Maine
- Known for: Economic entomology, systematics of parasitic Hymenoptera, aphids, and Diptera
- Awards: Eduardo L. Holmberg Prize (1939)
- Scientific career
- Fields: Entomology
- Institutions: Ministry of Agriculture, Argentina

Everard Eells Blanchard (16 December 1895 – 24 November 1971) was an American-Argentinian entomologist. He worked in Argentina under the ministry of agriculture studying the insects of the region. He worked both on economic entomology as well as the systematics of many groups including the parasitic hymenoptera, aphids, and diptera.

Blanchard was born in Buenos Aires, where his father Albert Elmert was a teacher at the Colegio Nacional de Buenos Aires. Along with his older brother Ensor, he received an early training as a pianist. The two Blanchard boys came to be known for their piano playing and Everard was later called the "second Paderweski" (after a Polish pianist who toured the US). Blanchard went to the US to study and joined the University of Maine. After World War I, he returned to Argentina and joined the agricultural zoology unit of the ministry of agriculture. In 1939 he received the Eduardo L. Holmberg Prize for his work on the Sarcophagidae of Argentina.
