= Jacques Blanchard =

French painter

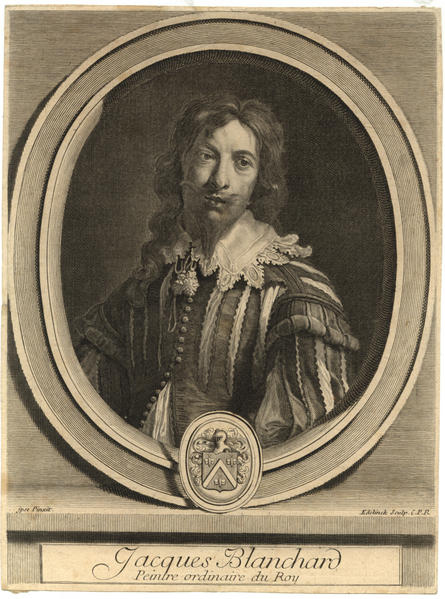
Portrait of Jacques Blanchard by Gérard Edelinck.

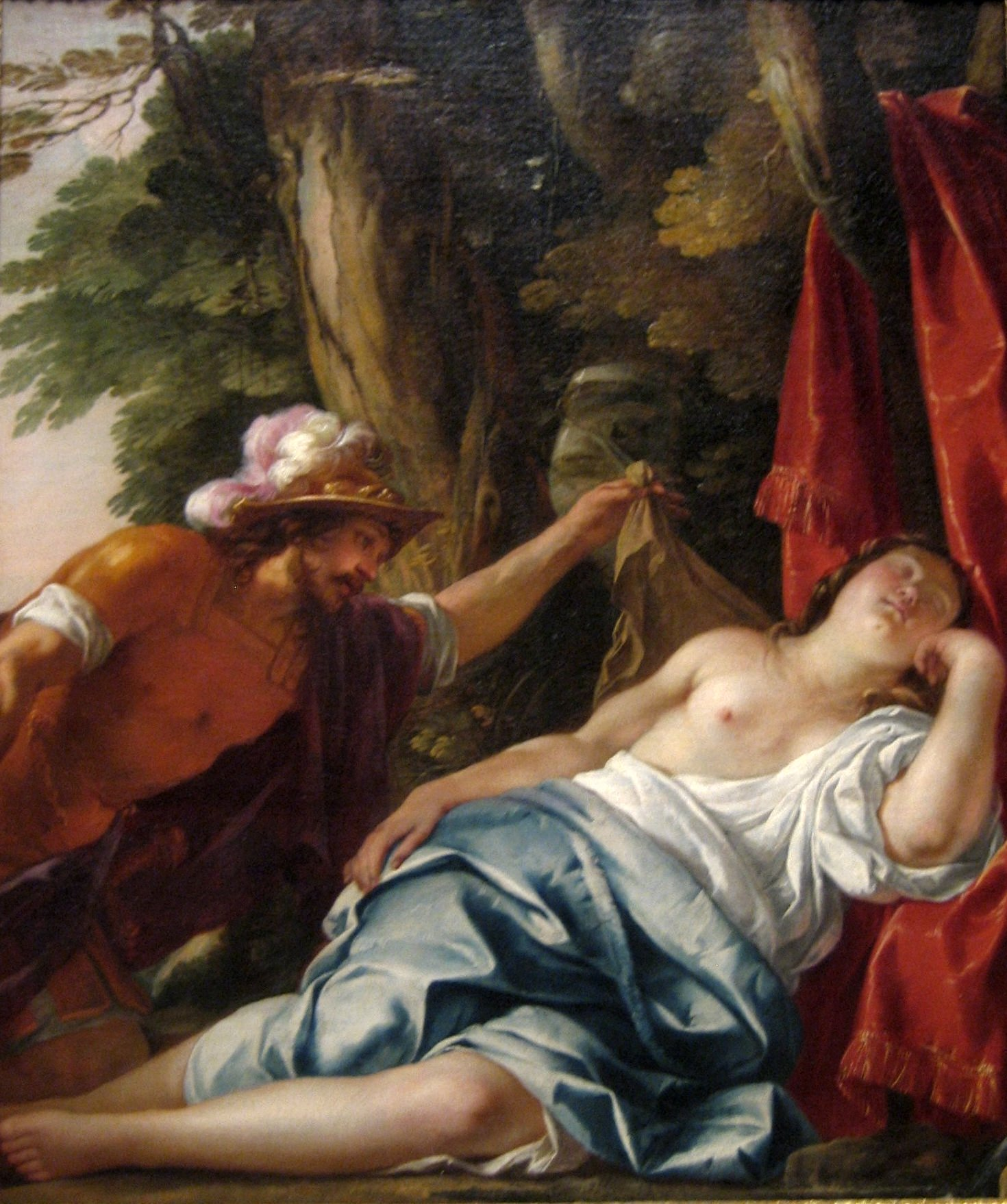
Mars and the Vestal Virgin, oil on canvas painting by Jacques Blanchard, ca. 1630, Art Gallery of New South Wales

Jacques Blanchard (1600 – 1638), also known as Jacques Blanchart, was a French baroque painter who was born in Paris. He was raised and taught by his uncle, the painter Nicolas Bollery (ca. 1560–1630). Jacques’s brother and son, Jean-Baptiste Blanchard (after 1602–1665) and Gabriel Blanchard (1630–1704), respectively were also painters.

== Life ==
=== Early years ===
Despite his polished and prolific output as a religious and decorative painter, very little is known of Blanchard’s early development. He apparently spent his adolescence apprenticed at the Paris studio of his maternal uncle Nicolas Baullery (c. 1550/60–1630). By 1618, he travelled to Lyon to work in the studio of Horace le Blanc, who must have recognised the young artist’s promise because when he left for Paris in 1623, Blanchard is known to have finished a number of the works he left behind. in his studio, including perhaps the Virgin and Child with a Bishop and a Woman Holding a Baby (Lyon, St Denis).

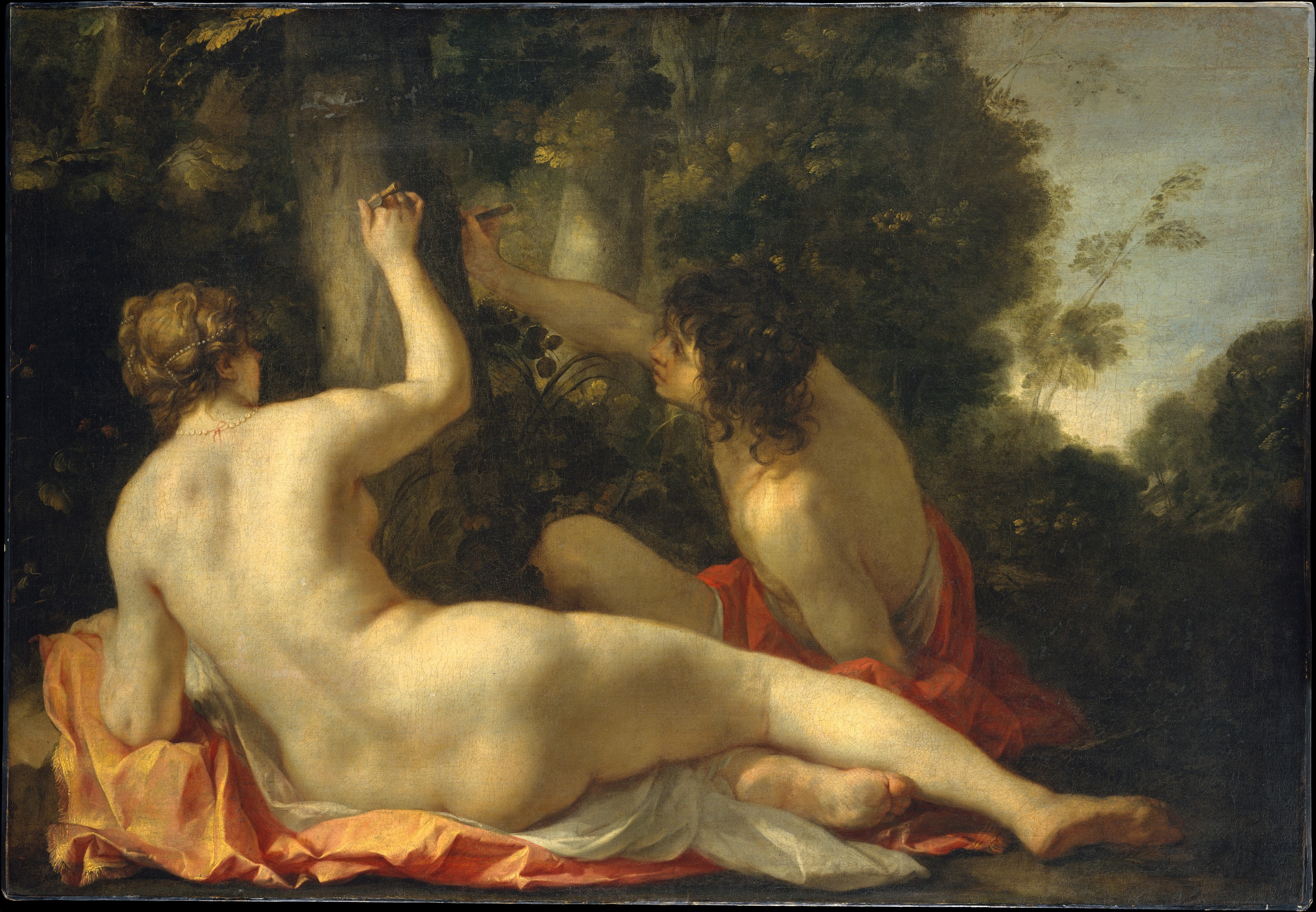
Angelica and Medoro

=== Travels in Italy ===
At the end of October 1624, Blanchard travelled to Rome in the company of his brother Jean, where it is possible that he encountered such contemporaries as Simon Vouet, Jacques Stella, Claude Mellan and Nicolas Poussin. Later, around April or May 1626, Blanchard progressed to Venice, where he remained for two more years and it was here that his style matured. Throughout his career Blanchard was to borrow lavishly from Titian and Tintoretto, but more specifically from Veronese, whose silvery blond palette and limpid light Blanchard used most effectively in his small religious and mythological subjects.

=== Return to France ===
While Blanchard’s travels and encounters in Italy between 1624 and 1629 are relatively well-documented, all that is really known of his actual output during this period comes down to us through accounts by the French historian, architect and theorist André Félibien, and the writer Charles Perrault. Both authorities recount, for example, that Blanchard’s Venetian oeuvre included depictions from Ovid’s Metamorphoses, and that he executed such works as the Loves of Venus and Adonis executed in Turin for Charles-Emanuel I, Duke of Savoy. After his tenure in Turin, and following a brief return to Venice, in 1629 Blanchard finally re-patriated himself to France, where he was to remain for the rest of his career. It is within this ten-year span between his return to France and his death in 1638 that most of his surviving works.

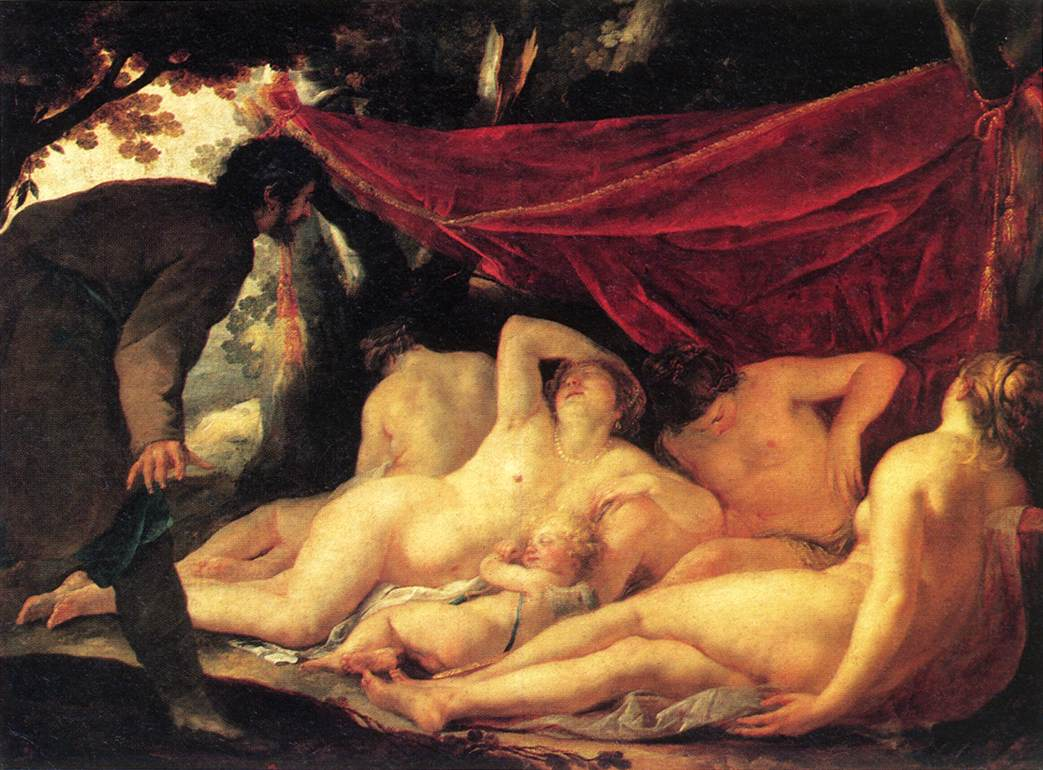
Venus and the Three Graces Surprised by a Mortal

They show him to stand quite apart from his contemporaries, not only in his painting style but also in his choice of sensual subject-matter, for example the Bacchanal at Nancy.

== Works, technique, and themes ==
Blanchard’s first major French commission is his earliest surviving dated work, the Virgin with the Christ Child Giving the Keys to St Peter (Albi Cathedral), painted in Lyon in 1629. The painting shows Bolognese influence in such details as the faces, but is overall still more indebted to the artist’s knowledge of 16th Century Venetian painters. Between 1631 and 1632, he undertook his next important project, the decoration of the Hôtel le Barbier. While these works no longer survive, they were recorded by Dézallier d’Argenville in his Abrégé of 1762, wherein the writer recalls that Blanchard executed fourteen compositions with mythological and literary themes. Admittedly, some doubt lingers as to the exact extent of the literary themes Blanchard explored in his scheme for the Hôtel de Barbier.

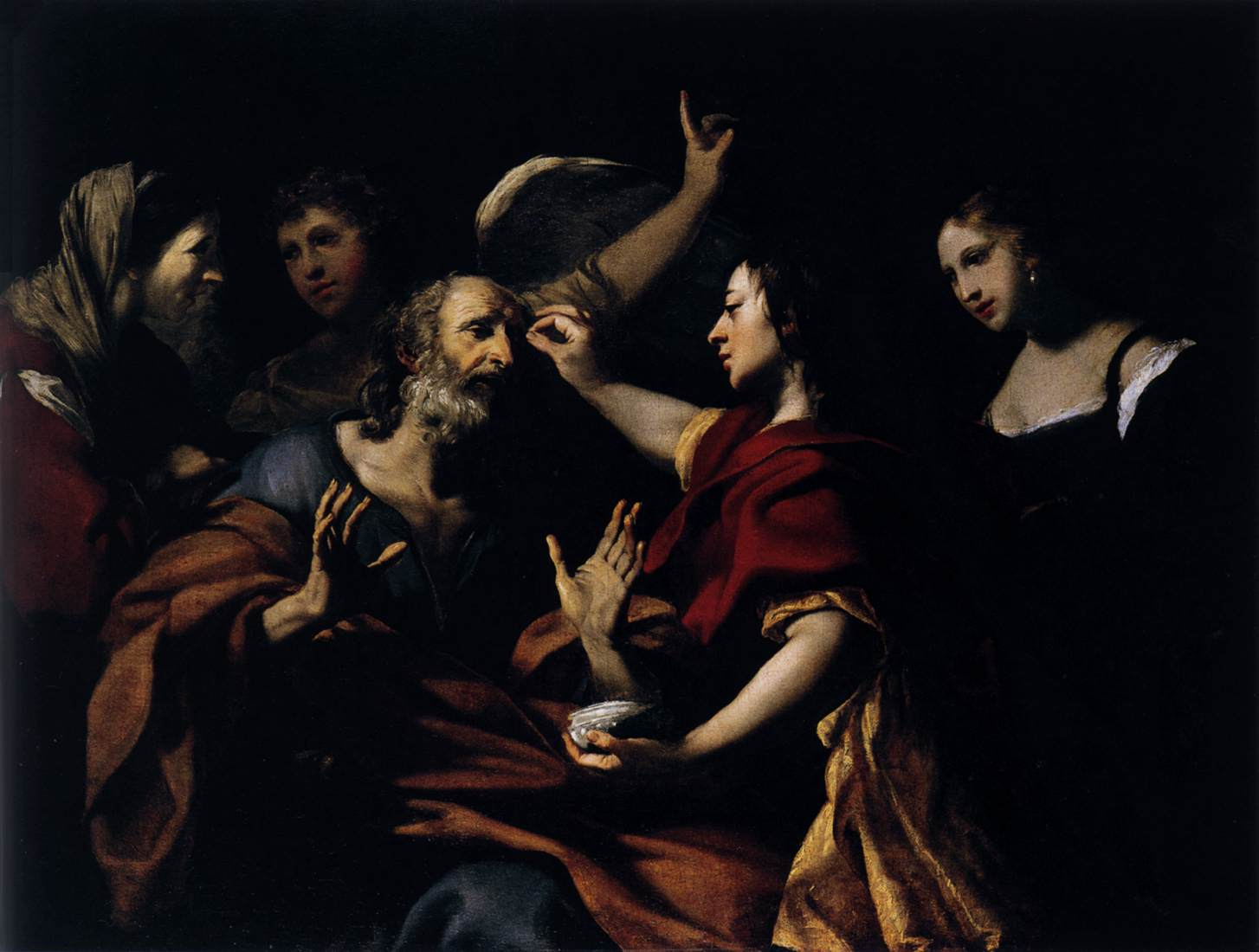
Tobias Healing the Blindness of His Father

The chief influences were the sixteenth century painters, especially Titian and Tintoretto with their rich, warm colours, and Veronese, whose blond and silvery colour and limpid light he used most effectively in his small religious and mythological subjects. The several versions of Charity, depicted as a young woman with two or three children, are excellent examples of his tenderness of colour handling, and of a softness of sentiment nearer to the 18th than to the 17th century. He was also a sensitive portrait painter, and played a leading part in French painting of the 1630s.

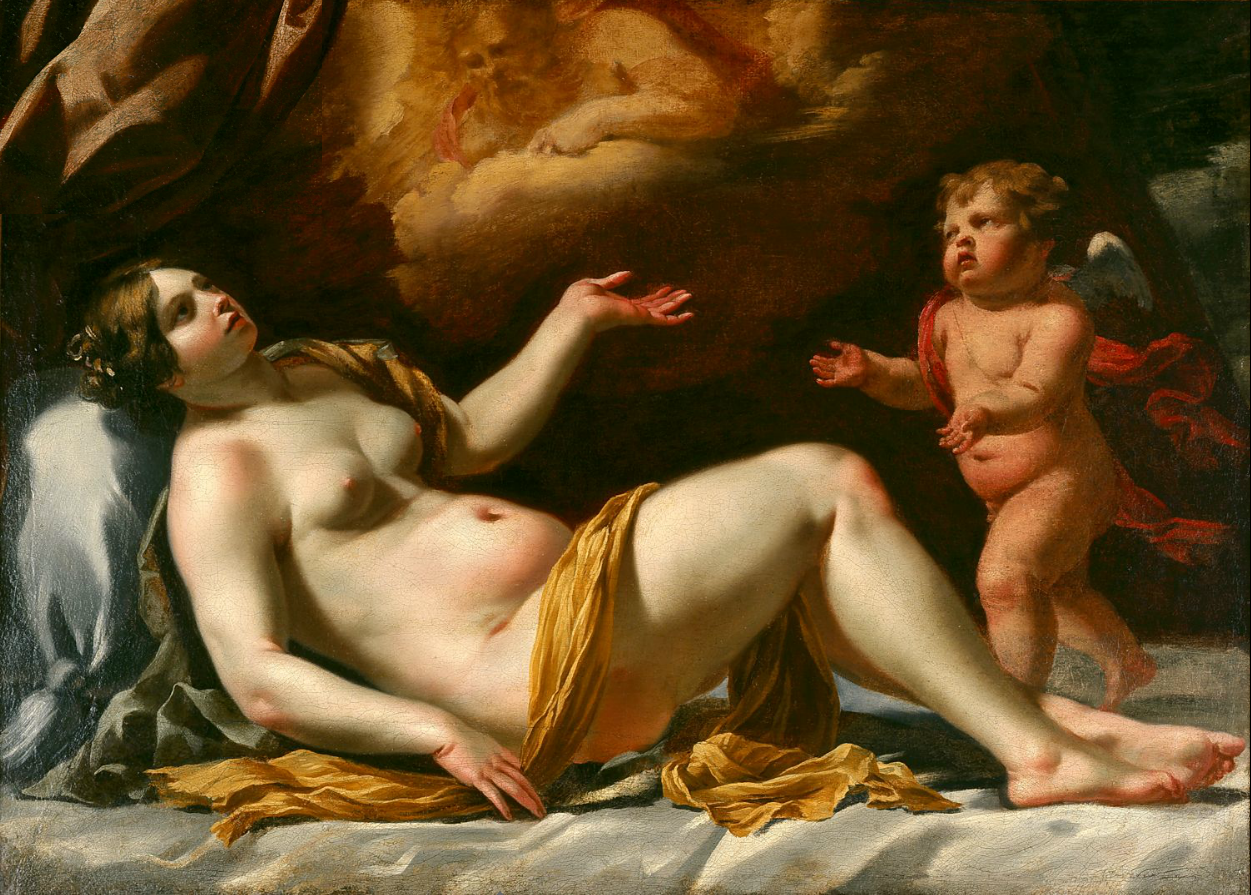
Danaë

In addition to his religious, literary and mythological subjects, Blanchard was also a sensitive portrait painter, and in his short career played a leading part in the development of French painting in general during the 1630s. Perrault called him the ‘Titian of France’, and Félibien stated that he reintroduced le bon gout to French painting. Blanchard oscillated throughout his career between two distinct tendencies—the cool and polished handling of the Bolognese painters and the more warmly sensuous and warm colourism of the Venetians. But it is perhaps the Venetian element which is particularly evident in the present work. Other similar works are Blanchard’s several versions of Charity, particularly the canvas in Toledo, Ohio and his sensual and complex Bacchanal in Nancy. In these allegorical and mythological works vividly illustrate Blanchard’s sensitive approach to colour and light and possess a delicacy of sentiment that is perhaps nearer to the 18th rather than to the 17th century.

He died of consumption in Paris in 1638. This painter should not be confused with the French sculptor of the same name who lived from 1634 to 1689.
