= Nicolas Baullery =

French painter and illustrator

- Born: c. 1560
- Died: c. 1630
- Known for: Painting

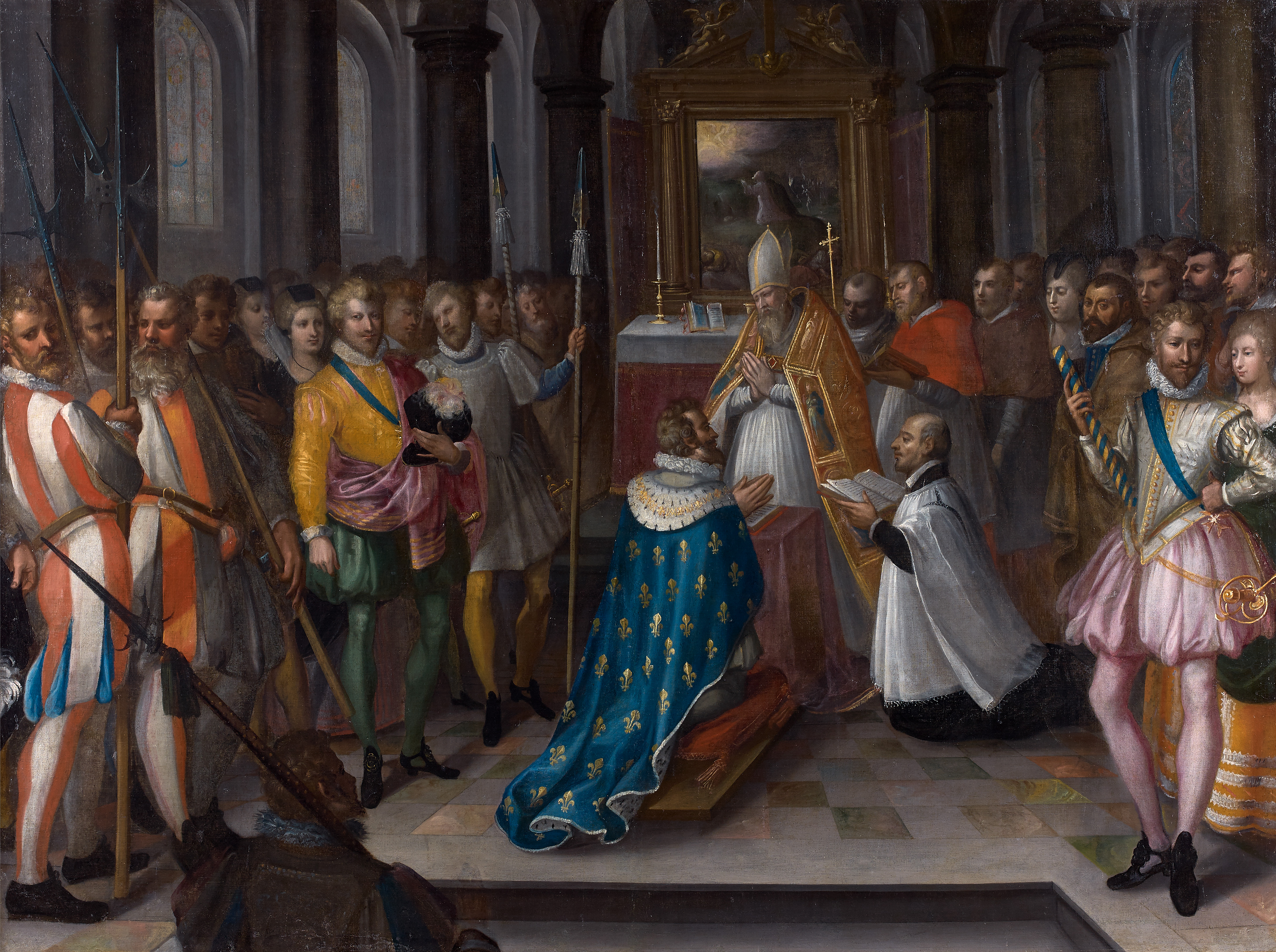
L'abjuration d'Henri IV, le 25 juillet 1593, in Basilica of Saint-Denis

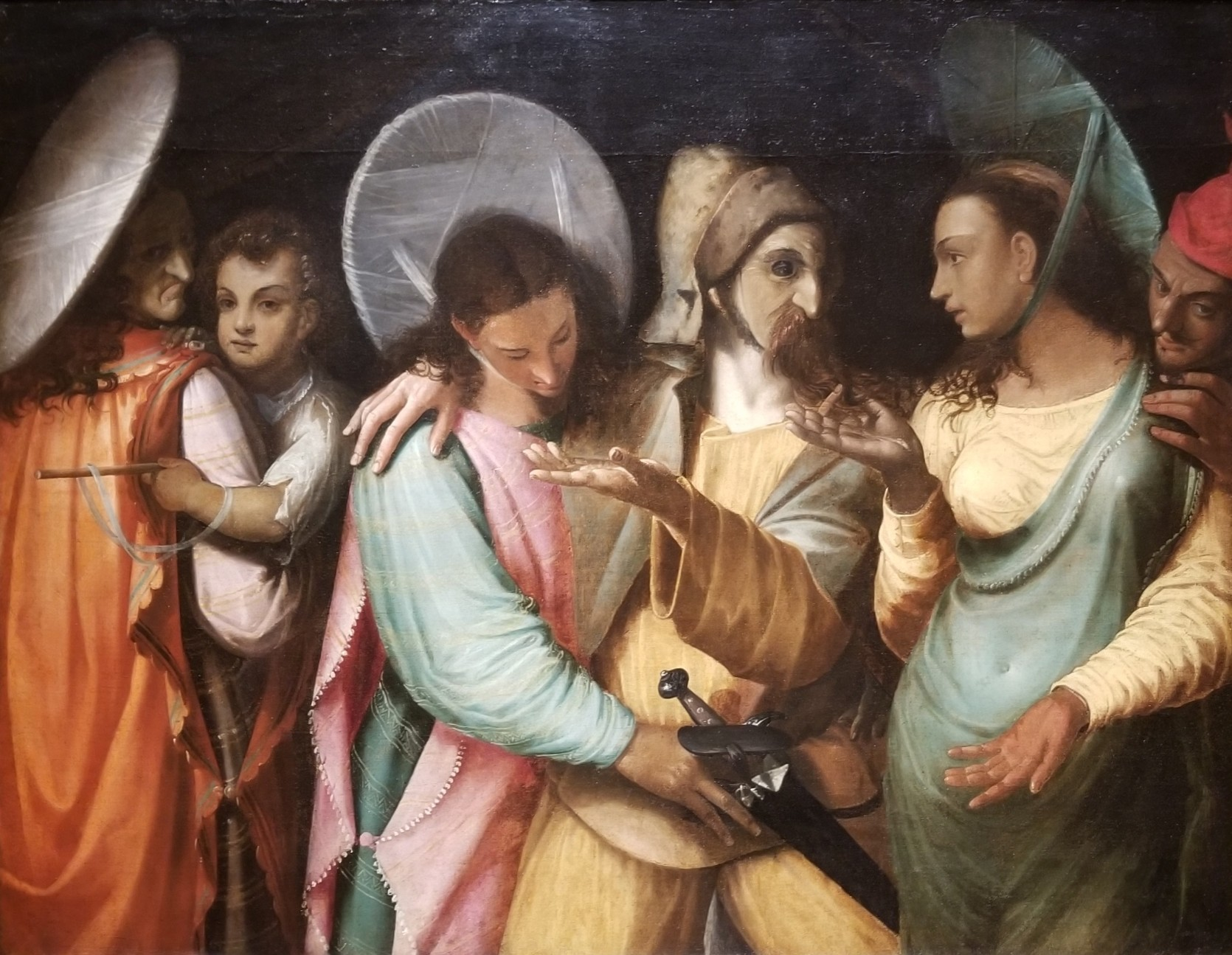
The Actors, attributed to Nicolas Bollery, at Ringling Museum of Art

Nicolas Baullery, Bolleri or Bollery (c. 1560–1630) was a French painter and illustrator.

== Life ==
He was from a Parisian family and his father Jérôme and nephew Jacques Blanchard were also painters - Blanchard served as an apprentice under Nicolas.

He worked on several churches in Paris (the Benedictine Blancs-Manteaux, the Third Order one of Picpus, the Chartreux) and produced 'petits Mays' for Notre-Dame de Paris. He also produced engravings on the theme of Henry IV of France's entry into Paris in 1594.

== Works ==
- Nativité, church at Chassey
- Christ before Pilate, formerly in the church at Charly-sur-Marne, location now unknown (the church was destroyed in World War I and its contents were housed in civic buildings; the painting was sold by the town in 1981; on 15 October 2008, number 13 in the list of works dispersed from Guy and Christiane Aldecoa's collection was misidentified as the work)
- Adoration of the Shepherds, église Saint Martin, Fontenay-Trésigny
- Adoration of the Shepherds, cathédrale Saint-Étienne de Toulouse
- Peasant dance ou Country Dance at Celleneuve, Montpellier, musée Fabre

=== Previously attributed to him ===
- Henry IV Renouncing Protestantism in the basilique Saint-Denis, undated, musée d'art et d'histoire de Meudon, inv. A. 1974-1-6. (formerly in the l'église Saint-Martin de Meudon).

== Bibliography ==
- (in French) Pierre Marcel, Jean Guiffrey, « Une illustration du "Pas des armes de Sandricourt" par Jérôme ou Nicolas Bollery », dans Gazette des Beaux-Arts, 1907, t.37, p. 277-288.
