= Azariel Blanchard Miller =

Founder of Fontana, California

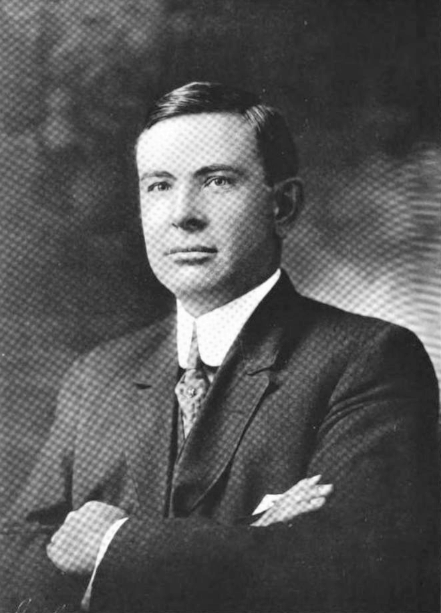
- Born: 5 September 1878; Redlands, California, U.S.
- Died: 13 April 1941 (aged 62); Fontana, California, U.S.

Azariel Blanchard Miller (5 September 1878 – 13 April 1941) was an American farmer, rancher, and developer credited with founding the city of Fontana, California, in 1913. Miller Park, Miller Avenue, and Fontana A.B. Miller High School are community landmarks named after him.

== Personal life ==
Miller was born in either Redlands, California or Richlands, North Carolina, to Joseph Kempster Miller and Eliza (Blanchard) Miller, he spent his childhood in Washington, D.C. before finishing his schooling in Riverside, California. He also attended one year at Claremont College in Pomona, California.

His brother Kempster Blanchard Miller (1870–1933) was an electrical engineer and executive with the Kellogg Switchboard & Supply Company (1899–1904), and wrote what has been considered the seminal textbook on the telephone technology of the time, "American Telephone Practice."

He was also the uncle of Ruth Miller, also known as Ruth Blanchard Miller or Ruth Kempster, a renowned California artist whose works were exhibited at the 1932 Olympics.

== Founding of Fontana ==
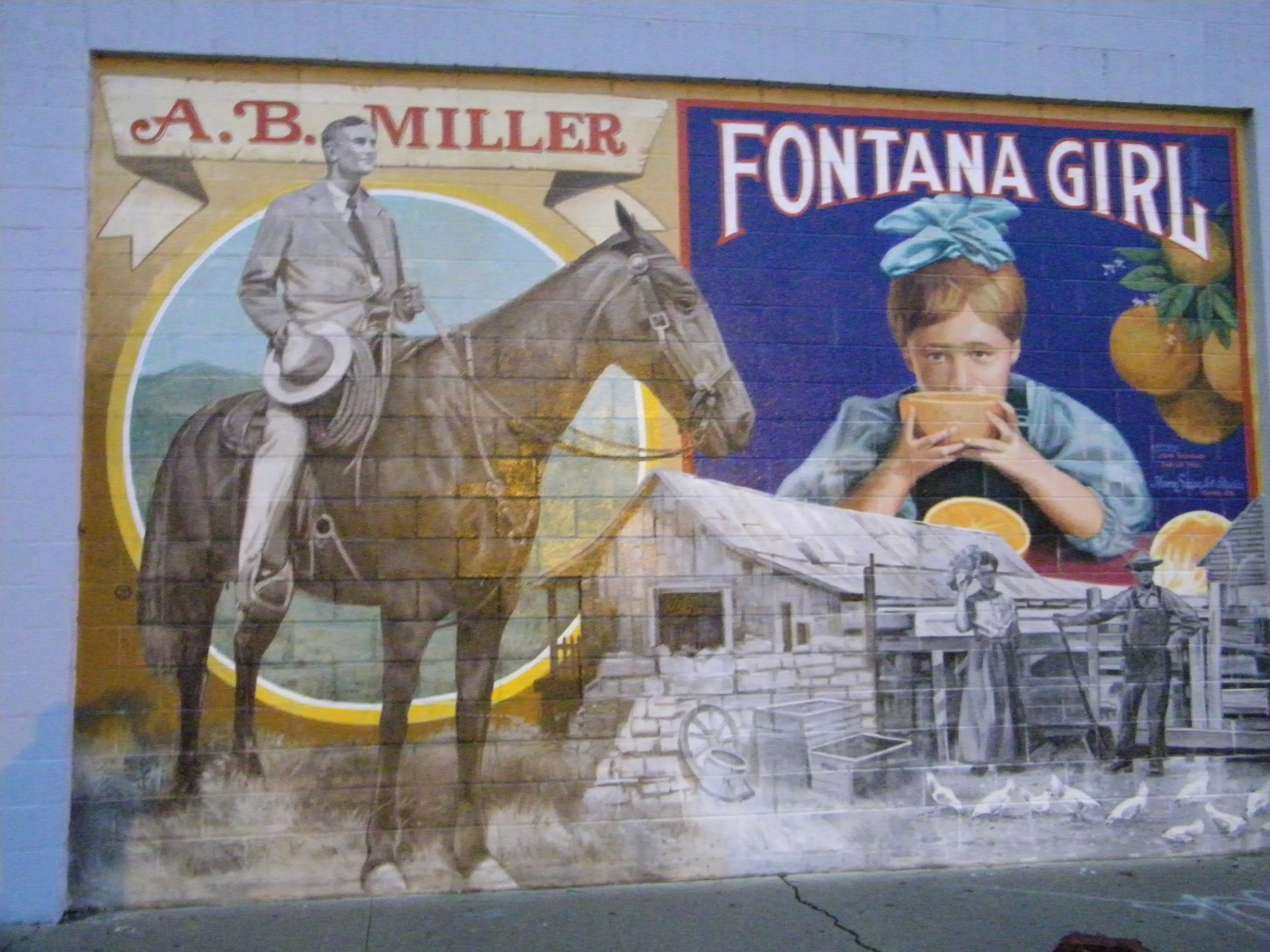
A.B. Miller on horseback as depicted in an outdoor mural in downtown Fontana, California

Upon purchasing 17,000 acres in what was first called Rosena in 1905, Miller used 200 horses, mules, plows and scrapers to transform the area into citrus fruit orchards, poultry and cattle farms. The town was renamed Fontana in 1913.

== Businessman, developer ==
Miller was President of Fontana Farms (citrus), Fontana Land Company, Fontana Union Water Company (still in operation), Fontana Power Company, B. B. Company, and Miller Livestock Company.

He was also founder and first director of the First National Bank of Fontana.

== Community involvement ==
- President of the State Agricultural Society, 1931–38;
- Ex officio Regent for the University of California 1931-1938, then appointed to fill unexpired term of Regent Gallwey, 1938–41;
- Member of the Chambers of Commerce for both Los Angeles and San Bernardino;

== Death ==
Azariel Blanchard Miller died on 13 April 1941 in Fontana, California, at the age of 62.

== See also ==
- U.S. Rabbit Experimental Station
