= Blanche Blanchard =

American painter (1866–1959)

Blanche Blanchard (1866–1959) was a female artist from New Orleans best known for her paintings of landscapes, portraits and genre paintings.

Blanchard was born in New Orleans, Louisiana and is the daughter of Captain Dawson A. Blanchard and the granddaughter of Major General Albert Gallatin Blanchard of the provisional Confederate Army. Blanchard was known for being a musician, a poet, an actress, and a painter. She considered herself an accomplished harpist, soprano singer, and poet.

Blanchard spent her early life in New Orleans, and later moved to Washington D.C. Unlike many other southern white ladies before 1960, Blanchard was able to be true to herself. Many women in her position were expected to maintain southern social order, better known as southern tradition. Blanchard broke through the barriers and roles created by powerful white men and their society. Blanchard studied art at the convent school called The Academy of the Daughters of Charity in Emmetsburg, Maryland. In 1888, Blanchard studied under Andrews at the Corcoran Gallery of Art, where she copied and created master studies of the painting in the gallery. Many artists create master paintings at some point in their educational career. In 1897, the Corcoran Gallery of Art opened a new building that had enough space for both a gallery and a school of art. President Grover Cleveland, Frances Folsom Cleveland Preston, and the Presidential Cabinet attended. At some point Blanche Blanchard met President Grover Cleveland and left quite the impression on him. The presidential administration of the time commissioned Blanchard to paint a portrait of President Cleveland for the white house collection. Blanche Blanchard moved back to New Orleans to live in her parents’ home shortly after the completion of the painting of President Cleveland.

In the early-to-mid 1900s, it was fashionable to take art lessons from artists and to patronize them. Blanche Blanchard was among the amateurs with whom William Aiken Walker and Claudius Giroux worked. It was not uncommon to find Walker and other artists to be found at the Blanchard home at 2700 Magazine Street in New Orleans, La. Furthermore, Giroux intermittently lived in the Blanchard home. As part of the teaching techniques, Blanche Blanchard and the other amateur artists would paint the background, the artist-teacher would paint the picture or main subject and the student would sign the painting. Reportedly, more than five paintings signed by Blanche Blanchard were painted by Giroux.

Blanchard developed her own style in landscapes, particularly in her orange-skied, atmospheric Louisiana tidewater scenes and her cabin scenes, which can be classed with Walker, Rudolph, Andrieu, and Molinary. Blanchard generally signed her paintings with a small B.B. Blanche married the architect, Charles Milo Williams. Together with her husband, they made their 1035 Carrollton Avenue home a focal point for art and music in their community. Together they had three children: Milo Blanchard Williams (1898–1960), Lavinius LaSalle Williams (1900–1976), and Clorette Scully Williams (1910–1979). Blanchard participated in the Exhibit of Woman's Work in the Louisiana State Department at the World's Industrial and Cotton Centennial Exposition in 1884 to 1885. In the later years of Blanchard's life, she and her husband organized and directed the Literary and Musical Club of New Orleans. Blanchard was an early member of the Artist's Association of New Orleans. Blanchard's Major General William J. Behan 1893, oil on canvas was included in Women Artists of Louisiana, 1825–1965: a Place of Their Own at the New Orleans Museum of Art, in New Orleans.
