= Governor Blanchard =

Governor Blanchard may refer to:

- James Blanchard (born 1942), 45th Governor of Michigan
- Newton C. Blanchard (1849–1922), 33rd governor of Louisiana
