= James Blanchard (scientist) =

Canadian physician

James Blanchard is a Canadian physician who is Professor of Community Health Science at the University of Manitoba and a Canada Research Chair in Epidemiology and Global Public Health.

Blanchard has done research and public health program development related to HIV/AIDS in India and other south Asian countries. Between 2001 and 2007 he was based in Bangalore, India, helping to establish and lead the University's extensive program of HIV research and public health programming. In addition to his research and program leadership, Blanchard has provided technical advice for national and international organizations, including the national AIDS control programs for India, Pakistan and Sri Lanka and the World Bank.

Blanchard has also worked with a diverse group of researchers in Manitoba to better understand the extent, distribution and causes of inflammatory bowel disease.

== Education ==
After receiving his M.D. from the University of Manitoba in 1986 and completing an internship with the Manitoba Teaching Hospitals, Blanchard worked as a general practitioner for the University of Manitoba's Northern Medical Unit in Fisher Branch, Manitoba for two years.

Blanchard then pursued education in epidemiology and public health at the Johns Hopkins University School of Hygiene and Public Health receiving his Masters in Public Health in 1990 and his Ph.D. in Epidemiology in 1997.

== Career ==
Blanchard is a Professor in the Departments of Community Health Sciences and Medical Microbiology and Director of the University of Manitoba's Centre for Global Public Health. He received his Tier 2 Canada Research Chair in Epidemiology and Global Public Health in 2004. During his academic career he has received numerous awards, including the Frederick G. Banting Award from the Canadian Diabetes Association and the 2006 Rh Award for Health Sciences at the University of Manitoba from the Winnipeg Rh Institute Foundation.
