= Fontana, California =

City in California, United States

- City
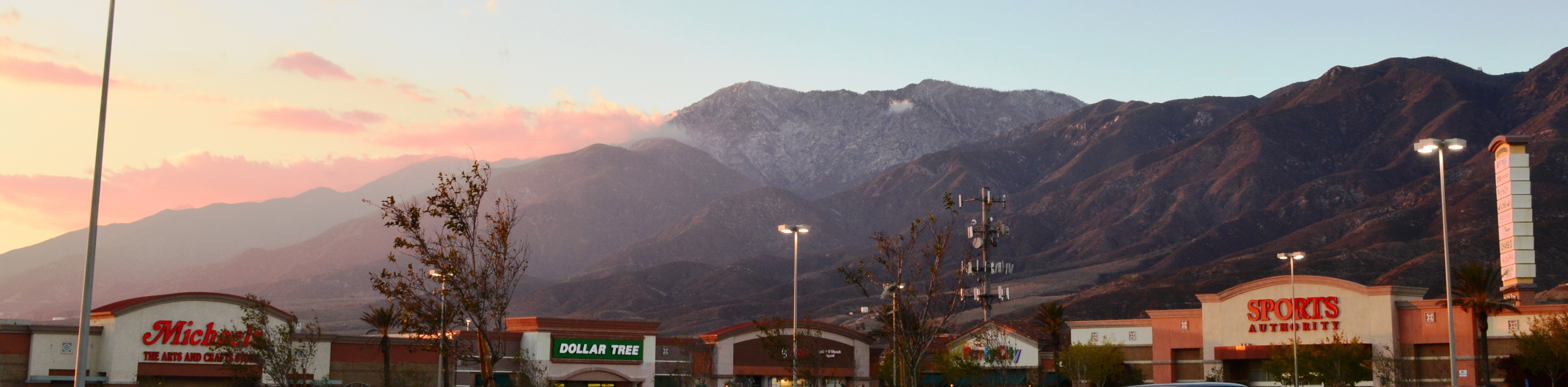
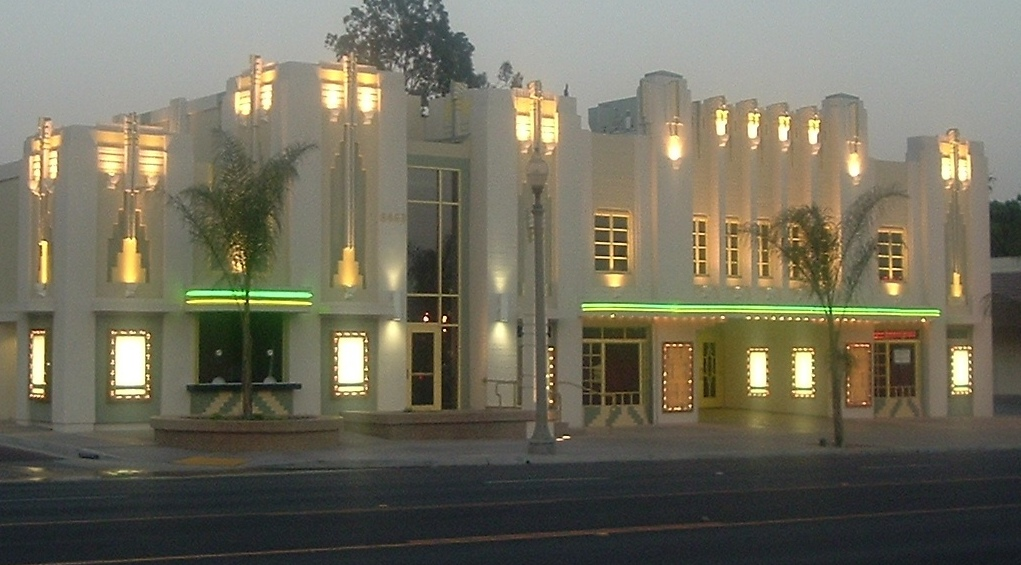
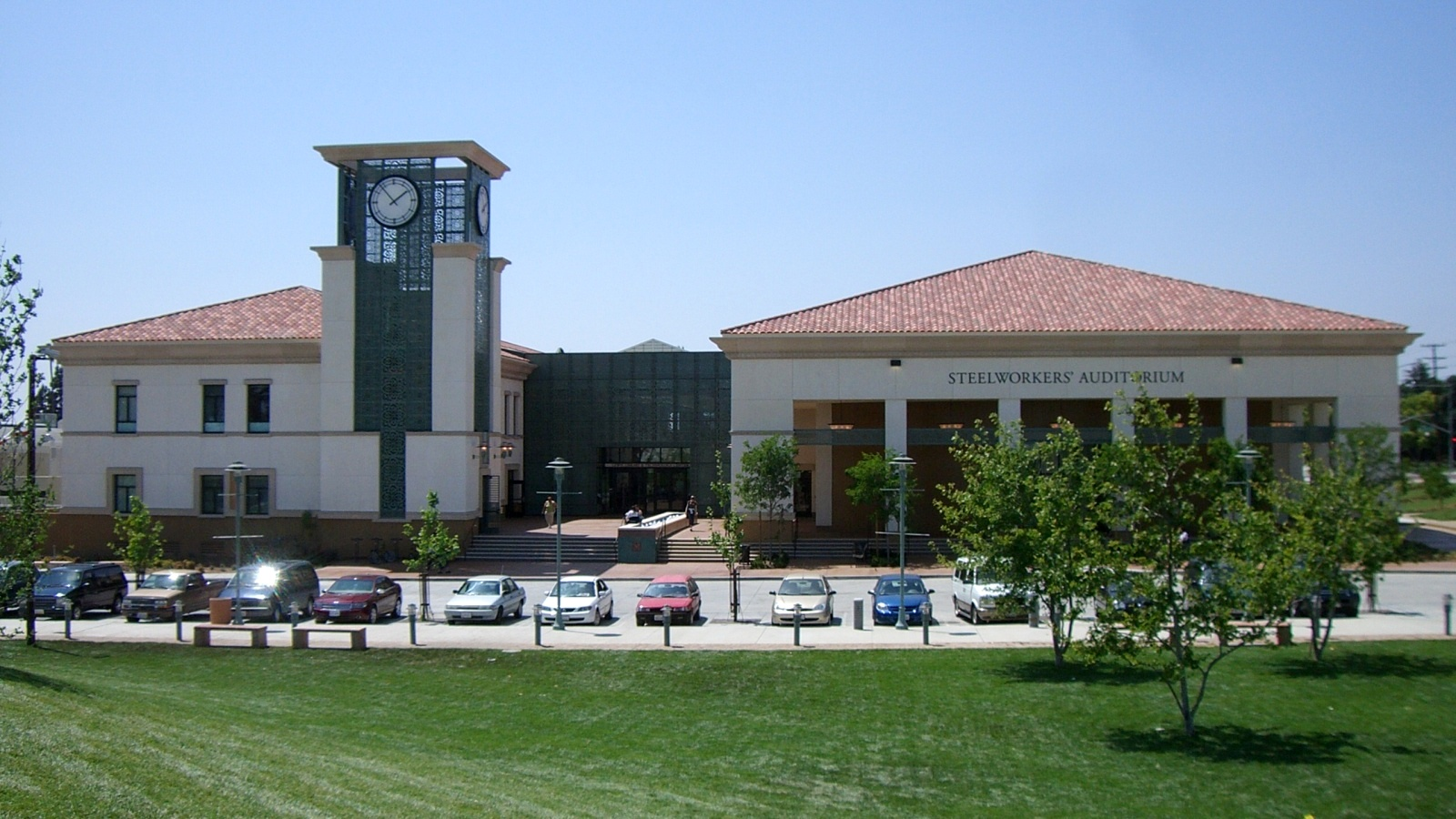
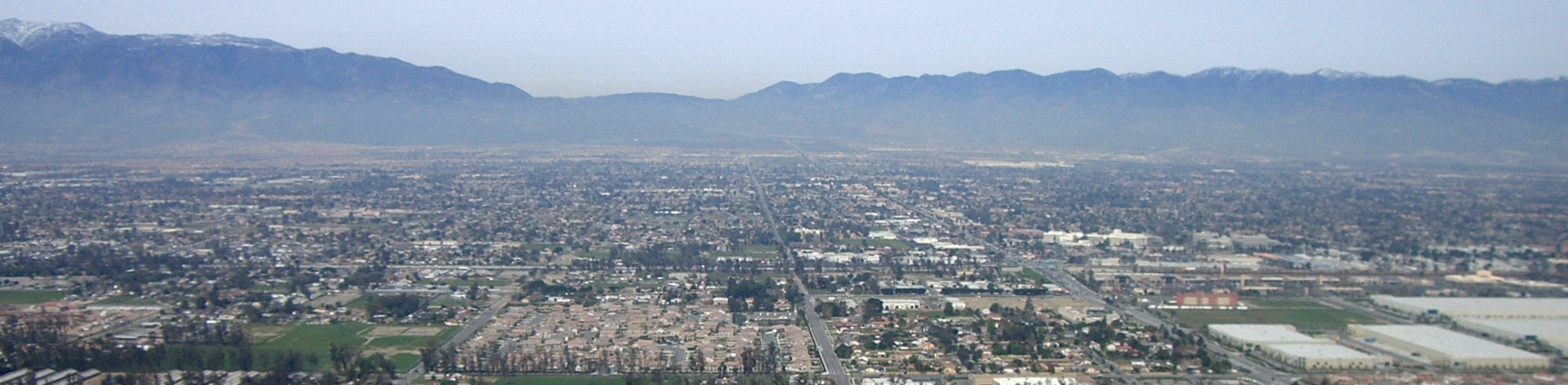
- Counterclockwise: Cucamonga Peak in the San Gabriel Mountains; Fontana Center Stage; aerial view of Fontana; Lewis Library

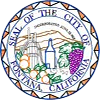
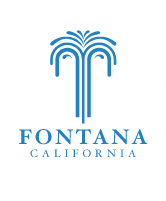
- Flag Seal Logo
- Motto: "City of Action"
- Interactive map of Fontana, California
- Location in the United States
- Coordinates: 34°6′N 117°28′W
- Country: United States
- State: California
- County: San Bernardino
- Founded: 1913
- Incorporated: June 25, 1952
- Named for: Italian for fountain or water source; in reference to the Santa Ana River

Government
  - Type: Council-Manager
  - City Council: Mayor Acquanetta Warren; Phillip Cothran; John Roberts; Jesse Sandoval; Peter Garcia
  - City clerk: Germaine Keyes
  - City Treasurer: Janet Koehler-Brooks
  - City Manager: Matthew Ballantyne

Area
  - Total: 43.07 sq mi (111.55 km^{2})
  - Land: 43.07 sq mi (111.55 km^{2})
  - Water: 0 sq mi (0.00 km^{2}) 0%
- Elevation: 1,237 ft (377 m)

Population
  - Total: 223,773
  - Rank: 2nd in San Bernardino County; 20th in California; 110th in the United States
  - Density: 5,327.9/sq mi (2,057.12/km^{2})
- Time zone: UTC−8 (PST)
  - Summer (DST): UTC−7 (PDT)
- ZIP Codes: 92331, 92334–92337
- Area codes: 909, 840
- FIPS code: 06-24680
- GNIS feature IDs: 1652711, 2410517
- Website: www.fontanaca.gov

Fontana is a city in the Inland Empire region of San Bernardino County, California, United States. Founded by Azariel Blanchard Miller in 1913, it remained essentially rural until World War II, when entrepreneur Henry J. Kaiser built a large steel mill in the area. It is now a regional hub of the trucking industry, with the east–west Interstate 10 and State Route 210 crossing the city and Interstate 15 passing diagonally through its northwestern quadrant. The city is about 46 miles (74 km) east of Los Angeles.

The United States Census Bureau reported that Fontana's 2020 population was 208,393, making it the second-most-populous city in San Bernardino County and the 20th largest in the state.

== History ==
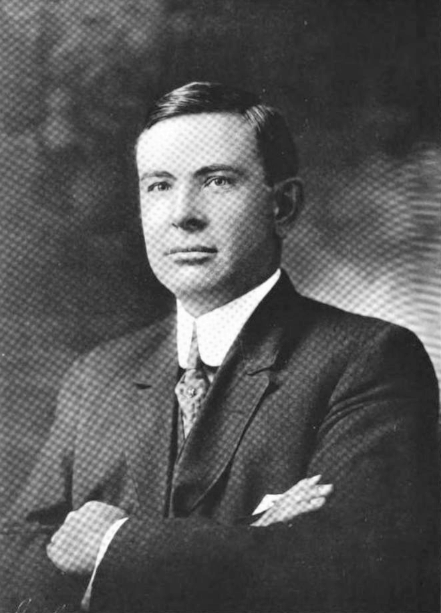
Azariel Blanchard Miller established the city of Fontana as its founder.

Native Americans inhabited the area.

Fontana, formerly Rosena from 1890 to 1919, was founded in 1919 by Azariel Blanchard Miller. The name fontana is Italian for fountain or water source; the city is close to the Santa Ana River to the east. Within a few years, it became an agricultural town of citrus orchards, vineyards and chicken ranches and astride U.S. Route 66 (now known as Foothill Boulevard). The Fontana area was radically transformed during World War II when Henry J. Kaiser built the Kaiser Steel plant just outside the city limits.

In 2019, the California Air Resources Board advised the City against housing people within 1,000 feet of industrial warehouses because of harmful truck pollution. The city was also sued by San Bernardino County, the Center for Biological Diversity, the Sierra Club and the Center for Community Action and Environmental Justice over the approval of West Valley Logistics Center, which violated state environmental laws.

In 2021, the city was sued by the State of California Attorney General's office for violation of the California Environmental Quality Act by encouraging warehouse development in low-income areas.

== Geography ==
Most of the city of Fontana, like its eastern neighbors Rialto and San Bernardino, is built atop a geologically young, gently southward-sloping alluvial fan from nearby Lytle Creek, deposited mainly during the Holocene and late-Pleistocene epochs. There are also sedimentary deposits of similar age from Etiwanda Creek on the western edge of the city. However, the northern and southern edges of the city are formed by the much older San Gabriel and Jurupa mountain ranges, respectively. The Jurupa Mountains are composed primarily of Cretaceous and Paleozoic-era rocks, as are the San Gabriels, which also include even older, Proterozoic formations. The most prominent of the San Gabriel Mountains visible from Fontana is Cucamonga Peak, elevation 8,859 feet (2,700 m). Additionally, the Cucamonga Fault Zone, contiguous with the Sierra Madre Fault Zone, runs through the northern part of the city, along the base of the San Gabriels, notably through the Hunter's Ridge and Coyote Canyon planned communities. It is estimated to be capable of producing earthquakes approximately of magnitude 6.0–7.0.

The city's listed elevation, measured from the northeast corner of the intersection of Upland Avenue and Sierra Avenue, downtown by City Hall, is 1,237 feet (377 m). The highest elevation within the city limits is approximately 2,600 feet (790 m), in the northernmost part of the Panorama neighborhood of Hunter's Ridge. The lowest point within the city limits is approximately 840 feet (260 m), at the intersection of Etiwanda and Philadelphia avenues, in the extreme southwestern corner of the city. This difference in elevation is due to the southward slope of the Lytle Creek alluvial fan.

=== Climate ===
The city is frequently affected by the strong, hot and dry Santa Ana winds as they blow through the nearby Cajon Pass of the San Gabriel Mountains, from the Mojave Desert. Fontana can also be extremely hot in summer, well over 100 °F (38 °C).

Climate data for Fontana, California
Month	Jan	Feb	Mar	Apr	May	Jun	Jul	Aug	Sep	Oct	Nov	Dec	Year
Record high °F (°C)	93 (33.9)	92 (33.3)	97 (36.1)	102 (38.9)	112 (44.4)	111 (43.9)	114 (45.6)	111 (43.9)	117 (47.2)	108 (42.2)	96 (35.6)	93 (33.9)	117 (47.2)
Mean daily maximum °F (°C)	69 (20)	70 (21.1)	71 (21.7)	77 (24.4)	81 (26.7)	89 (31.1)	95 (35)	96 (35)	92 (32.8)	83 (28.3)	74 (23.3)	70 (20.6)	81 (27.4)
Mean daily minimum °F (°C)	46 (7.2)	47 (8.3)	48 (8.3)	50 (9.4)	53 (11.7)	58 (13.9)	63 (16.7)	64 (17.2)	63 (16.7)	57 (13.3)	50 (9.4)	46 (6.7)	53.8 (11.87)
Record low °F (°C)	22 (−5.6)	28 (−2.2)	30 (−1.1)	30 (−1.1)	35 (1.7)	42 (5.6)	48 (8.9)	48 (8.9)	44 (6.7)	33 (0.6)	28 (−2.2)	23 (−5)	22 (−5.6)
Average precipitation inches (cm)	3.50 (8.89)	3.42 (8.68)	3.49 (8.86)	0.63 (1.60)	0.19 (0.48)	0.01 (0.02)	0.00 (0)	0.11 (0.27)	0.26 (0.66)	0.27 (0.68)	1.26 (3.20)	1.63 (4.14)	14.77 (37.51)
Source: weather.com

== Demographics ==
Historical population
Census	Pop.	Note	%±
1960	14,659		—
1970	20,673		41.0%
1980	36,804		78.0%
1990	87,535		137.8%
2000	128,929		47.3%
2010	196,069		52.1%
2020	208,393		6.3%
2025 (est.)	221,223	▲	6.2%
U.S. Decennial Census

=== Racial and ethnic composition ===
Fontana, California– Racial and ethnic composition Note: the US Census treats Hispanic/Latino as an ethnic category. This table excludes Latinos from the racial categories and assigns them to a separate category. Hispanics/Latinos may be of any race.
Race / Ethnicity (NH = Non-Hispanic)	Pop 2000	Pop 2010	Pop 2020	% 2000	% 2010	% 2020
White alone (NH)	30,865	30,279	25,883	23.94%	15.44%	12.42%
Black or African American alone (NH)	14,629	18,157	17,658	11.35%	9.26%	8.47%
Native American or Alaska Native alone (NH)	458	454	489	0.36%	0.23%	0.23%
Asian alone (NH)	5,398	12,456	16,992	4.19%	6.35%	8.15%
Native Hawaiian or Pacific Islander alone (NH)	351	474	447	0.27%	0.24%	0.21%
Other race alone (NH)	197	338	1,212	0.15%	0.17%	0.58%
Mixed race or Multiracial (NH)	2,607	2,954	4,443	2.02%	4.51%	2.13%
Hispanic or Latino (any race)	74,424	130,957	141,269	57.72%	66.79%	67.79%
Total	128,929	196,069	208,393	100.00%	100.00%	100.00%

=== 2020 census ===
The 2020 United States census reported that Fontana had a population of 208,393. The population density was 4,838.4 inhabitants per square mile (1,868.1/km^{2}). The racial makeup of Fontana was 23.9% White, 9.0% African American, 2.2% Native American, 8.5% Asian, 0.3% Pacific Islander, 38.1% from other races, and 18.1% from two or more races. Hispanic or Latino of any race were 67.8% of the population.

The census reported that 99.8% of the population lived in households, 0.1% lived in non-institutionalized group quarters, and 0.1% were institutionalized.

There were 54,532 households, out of which 51.4% included children under the age of 18, 57.7% were married-couple households, 6.8% were cohabiting couple households, 22.3% had a female householder with no partner present, and 13.2% had a male householder with no partner present. 9.9% of households were one person, and 4.2% were one person aged 65 or older. The average household size was 3.81. There were 46,961 families (86.1% of all households).

The age distribution was 27.2% under the age of 18, 11.2% aged 18 to 24, 28.0% aged 25 to 44, 24.3% aged 45 to 64, and 9.3% who were 65 years of age or older. The median age was 32.9 years. For every 100 females, there were 97.3 males.

There were 55,632 housing units at an average density of 1,291.6 units per square mile (498.7 units/km^{2}), of which 54,532 (98.0%) were occupied. Of these, 66.8% were owner-occupied, and 33.2% were occupied by renters.

In 2023, the US Census Bureau estimated that 28.3% of the population were foreign-born. Of all people aged 5 or older, 42.0% spoke only English at home, 49.5% spoke Spanish, 1.1% spoke other Indo-European languages, 5.5% spoke Asian or Pacific Islander languages, and 2.0% spoke other languages. Of those aged 25 or older, 79.0% were high school graduates and 20.4% had a bachelor's degree.

The median household income was $98,187, and the per capita income was $31,888. About 8.9% of families and 10.3% of the population were below the poverty line.

=== 2010 ===
The 2010 United States census reported that Fontana had a population of 196,069. The population density was 4,620.8 inhabitants per square mile (1,784.1/km^{2}). The racial makeup of Fontana was 92,978 (47.4%) White (15.4% Non-Hispanic White), 19,574 (10.0%) African American, 1,957 (1.0%) Native American, 12,948 (6.6%) Asian, 547 (0.3%) Pacific Islander, 58,449 (29.8%) from other races, and 9,616 (4.9%) from two or more races. There were 130,957 people of Hispanic or Latino origin, of any race (66.8%).

The Census reported that 195,625 people (99.8% of the population) lived in households, 216 (0.1%) lived in non-institutionalized group quarters, and 228 (0.1%) were institutionalized.

There were 49,116 households, out of which 29,465 (60.0%) had children under the age of 18 living in them, 30,245 (61.6%) were opposite-sex married couples living together, 8,074 (16.4%) had a female householder with no husband present, 4,125 (8.4%) had a male householder with no wife present. There were 3,447 (7.0%) unmarried opposite-sex partnerships, and 317 (0.6%) same-sex married couples or partnerships. 4,801 households (9.8%) were made up of individuals, and 1,633 (3.3%) had someone living alone who was 65 years of age or older. The average household size was 3.98. There were 42,444 families (86.4% of all households); the average family size was 4.18.

In the city, 64,521 people (32.9%) were under the age of 18, 22,995 people (11.7%) aged 18 to 24, 57,646 people (29.4%) aged 25 to 44, 39,823 people (20.3%) aged 45 to 64, and 11,084 people (5.7%) were 65 years of age or older. The median age was 28.7 years. For every 100 females, there were 98.7 males. For every 100 females age 18 and over, there were 95.7 males.

There were 51,857 housing units at an average density of 1,222.1 units per square mile (471.9 units/km^{2}), of which 33,862 (68.9%) were owner-occupied, and 15,254 (31.1%) were occupied by renters. The homeowner vacancy rate was 2.6%; the rental vacancy rate was 6.0%. 134,857 people (68.8% of the population) lived in owner-occupied housing units and 60,768 people (31.0%) lived in rental housing units.

According to the 2010 United States census, Fontana had a median household income of $64,195, with 15.0% of the population living below the federal poverty line.

German, Irish, English, Italian and European are the most common ancestries. Spanish and Tagalog are the most common non-English languages.

== Economy ==
Fontana's economy is driven largely by industrial uses, particularly trucking-based industries. Public funding assists in reducing the associated pollution impacts the community.

In 2025, ZM Trucks announced plans to build a 210,000-square-foot zero-emission-truck manufacturing facility in Fontana. The facility also will serve at the company's corporate headquarter. ZM Trucks said the plant will be able to produce up to 100,000 medium- and heavy-duty all-electric vehicles per year.

According to the city's 2023 Comprehensive Annual Financial Report, the top employers in the city are:

#	Employer	# of Employees
1	Kaiser Permanente	9,677
2	Fontana Unified School District	5,983
3	Amazon	3,145
4	Saint Bernardine Medical Center	1,775
5	Target	1,297
6	City of Fontana	1,143
7	Walmart Distribution -Drop Yard	1,004
8	Walmart	1,004
9	Saia	349
10	Legendary Staffing	325

== Arts and culture ==
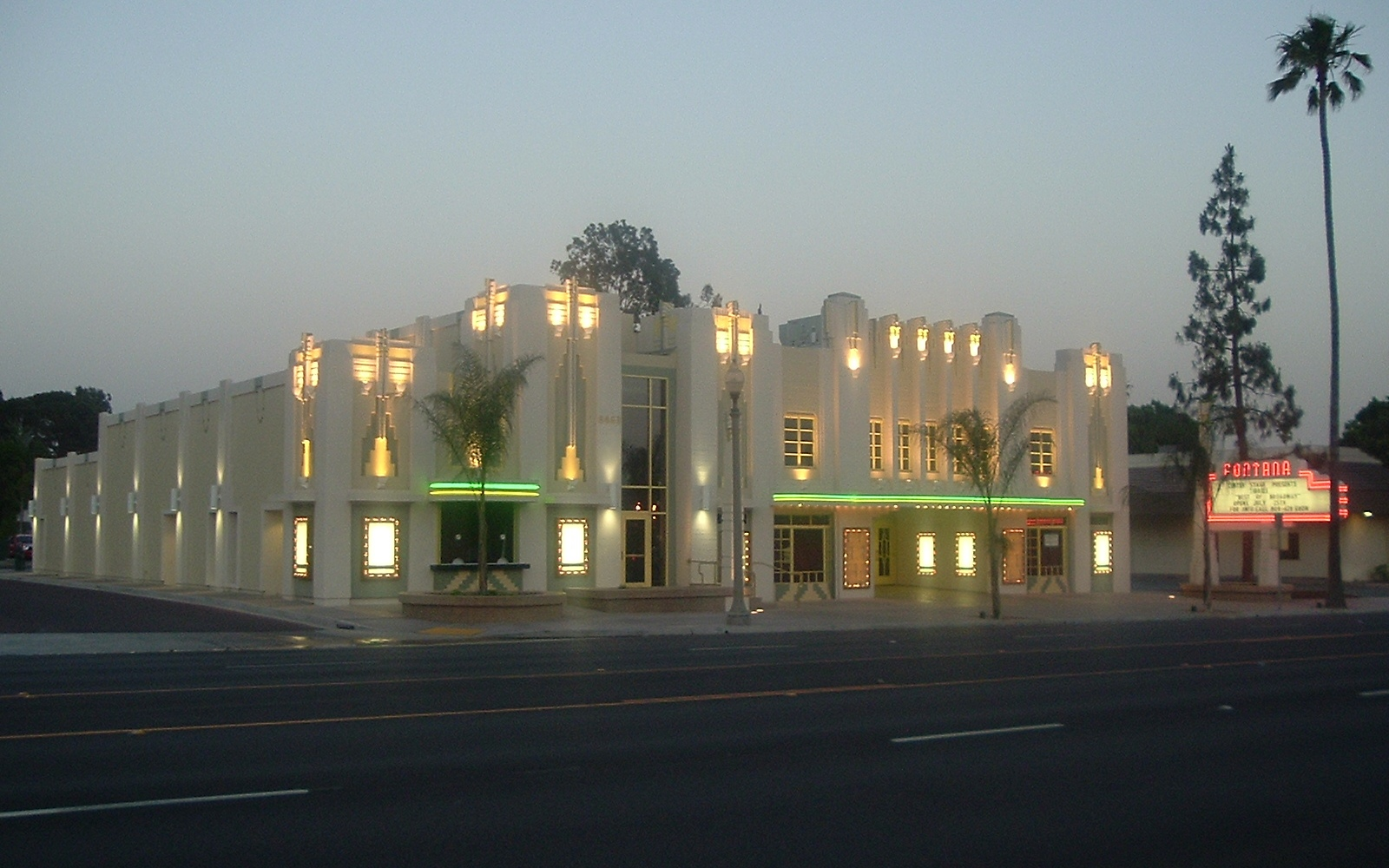
Center Stage Theater

The Center Stage Theater was built in the Art Deco style in 1937, and designed by architect C. H. Boller. The former Fontana (movie) Theater was recently renovated during 2004–2008 after several decades of various other uses, into a live dinner theater, with $6,000,000 in funds earmarked by the Fontana City Council. It reopened to the public on July 25, 2008. The Theater closed in 2022 for another major renovation, reopening in 2024 as Stage Red in honor of Fontana-raised musician Sammy Hagar, who performed on opening night.

The Art Depot is one of Fontana's original community centers, and is a specialized Cultural Arts facility. Originally built as a freight depot of the Pacific Electric Railway in 1915, the Art Depot sits alongside the newly landscaped Pacific Electric Trail in the Helen Putnam Historical Plaza. The Art Depot offers art classes, open studio activities, and special events.

=== Auto Club Speedway ===
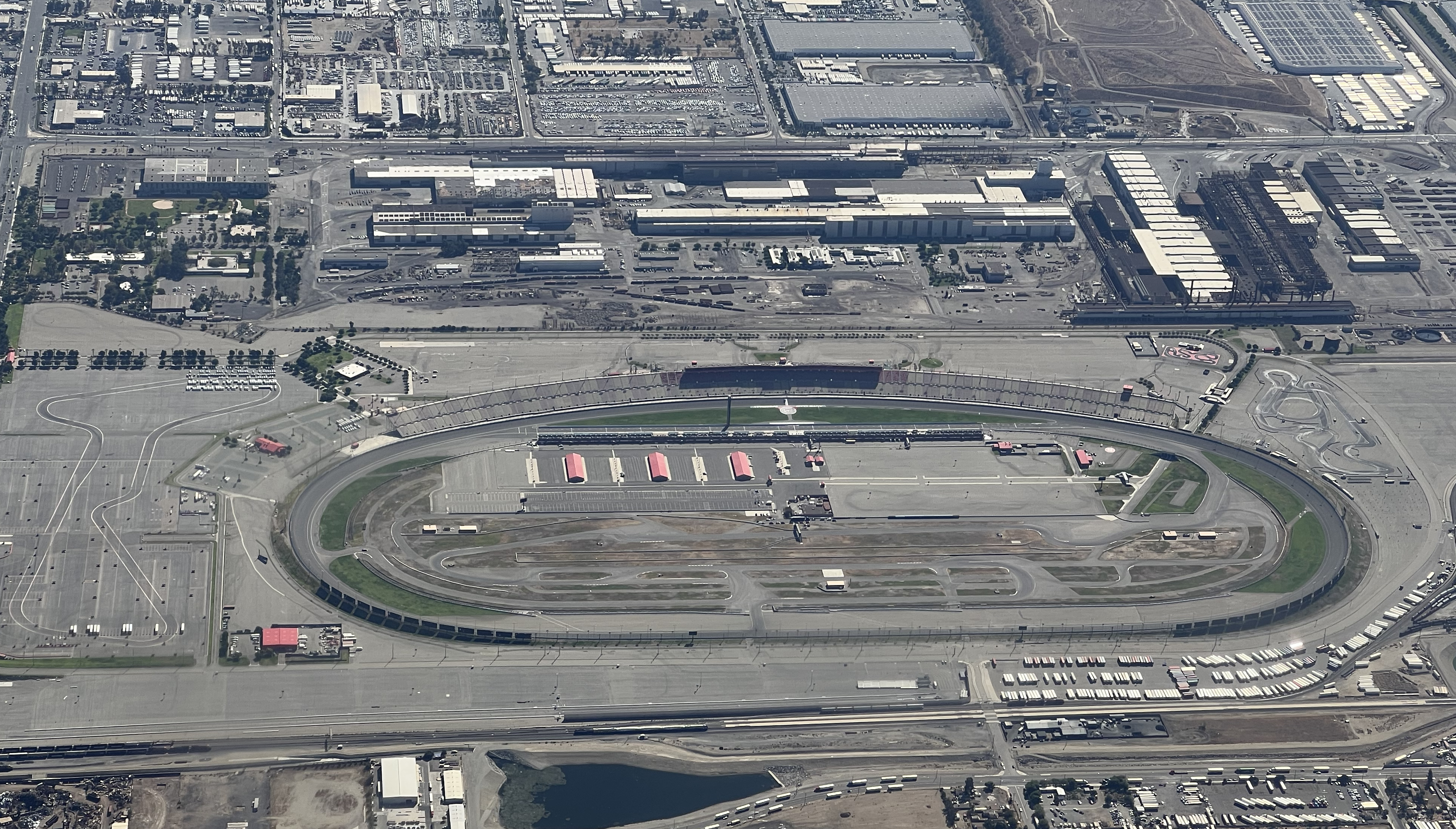
View of the Auto Club Speedway just outside Fontana (2021)

Auto Club Speedway, was a racetrack that played host to the NASCAR Cup Series and Xfinity Series, along with former IndyCar Series events. It is located in an unincorporated area just outside of Fontana. It is built on the former site of the Kaiser Steel mill. The large smelting furnaces of the mill were sold to China, and the rest remains a working steel mill operated by California Steel Industries, which is owned by the Japanese company JFE Steel Corporation. The track is currently transforming from a 2-mile oval into a 0.5 mile long short track that is similar in style to the Bristol Motor Speedway. In 2023 due to the COVID-19 pandemic forced demolition to be pushed back a year.

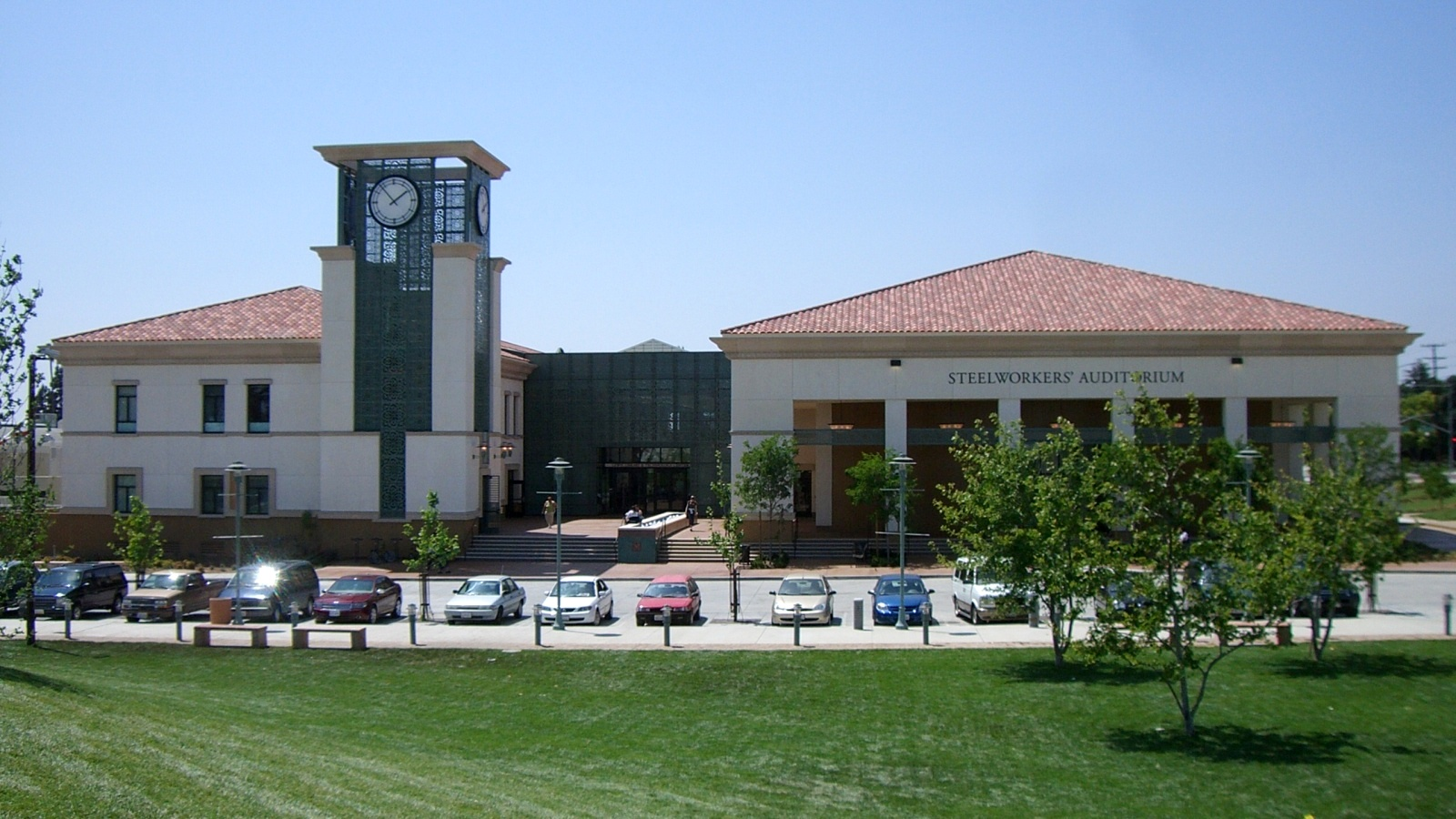
Lewis Library and Technology Center

The Lewis Library and Technology Center, opened in 2008 at an estimated cost of over $60,000,000, is the largest library in the San Bernardino County Library System.

== Parks and recreation ==
Martin Tudor Jurupa Hills Regional Park is an 861-acre (348 ha) multi-use park at the northeastern end of Mount Jurupa. The park includes the Mary Vagle Museum & Nature Center, the Martin Tudor Splash Park, and a 5-acre (2.0 ha) ancient Native American historic site.

The Cypress Neighborhood Center has in Fontana for over 30 years. Since then, it has undergone some renovations and changed some of its programming. The programming includes ballet, dance, karate, kickboxing, and a Tiny Tot programs.

The Don Day Neighborhood Center is a community recreation center located in South Fontana. Attached to the center is an outside pool that is only opened for the summer. They have open rooms used for programs like mixed martial arts, dance, fitness, gymnastics and events. There is a Tiny Tot Program affiliated with the center as well.

The center is also combined with Southridge Park, which has tennis courts, basketball courts, mountain bike trails, baseball fields, playgrounds, and open spaces.

Upon opening to the public on October 25, 2008, Fontana Park (located in the northern part of the city at Summit Avenue and Lytle Creek Road), is now the city's second largest municipal park, featuring a large community center (Jessie Turner Health and Fitness Community Center), aquatic center, skate park, dog park, basketball gym, sports pavilion, and several child-oriented play areas.

== Government ==
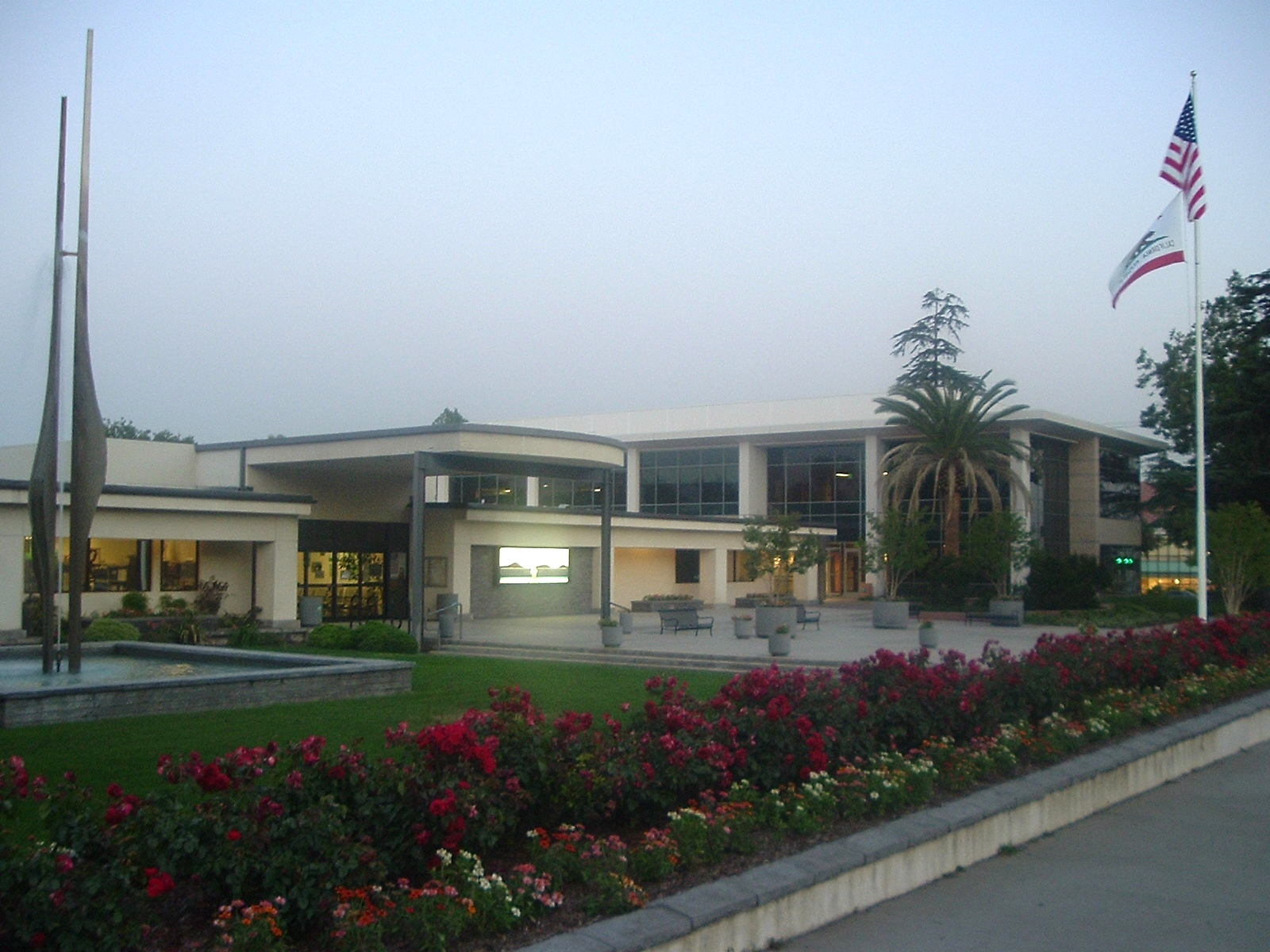
Fontana City Hall, on Sierra Avenue

=== Local government ===
Fontana is a general law city; it has no city charter. Led by a council composed of a mayor and four councilmembers, it uses a council-manager form of government. The mayor, city clerk, and city treasurer are elected at-large to serve four-year terms, while councilmembers are elected by district, also serving four-year terms.

According to data from the California State Controller’s Office, Fontana’s government-wide revenues totaled approximately $362.41 million and expenditures were about $320.75 million for 2023.

In 2021, city leadership was criticized by the California State Controller's Office for paying former city manager Ken Hunt $932,623 in 2020, though he had not worked a single day. The city mayor and city council declined to explain why such compensation was warranted for a city manager who had not worked in the city since 2019. The city council also failed to follow the Brown Act, which requires public agencies to specifically list closed-session items for terminations.

=== State and federal representation ===
In the California State Legislature, Fontana is in the 29th senatorial district, represented by Democrat Eloise Reyes, and in the 50th Assembly district, represented by Democrat Robert Garcia.

In the United States House of Representatives, Fontana is split between California's 33rd and 35th districts, which are represented by Democrat Pete Aguilar and Democrat Norma Torres, respectively.

== Education ==
=== Public schools ===
While most residents of the city attend schools within the Fontana Unified School District, some areas of the city are served by neighboring school districts:

- The northwest area of the city is partly served by the Etiwanda School District (K thru 8 only) and the Chaffey Joint Union High School District (high schools only).
- The southeast area of the city is partly served by the Colton Joint Unified School District.
- The northeast area of the city is partly served by the Rialto Unified School District.

=== Charter schools ===
There are two options for youth charter schools in Fontana. These schools are Entrepreneur High School Fontana and Options For Youth.

=== Community College ===
In 2026, construction will begin on a new $210.6 million Chaffey College campus in Fontana, replacing the community college's existing Fontana campus. The new facility will have four buildings across 15 acres, and will include a welcome center and library, an instructional building, an automotive technology laboratory and an operations and maintenance building.

== Infrastructure ==
=== Transportation ===
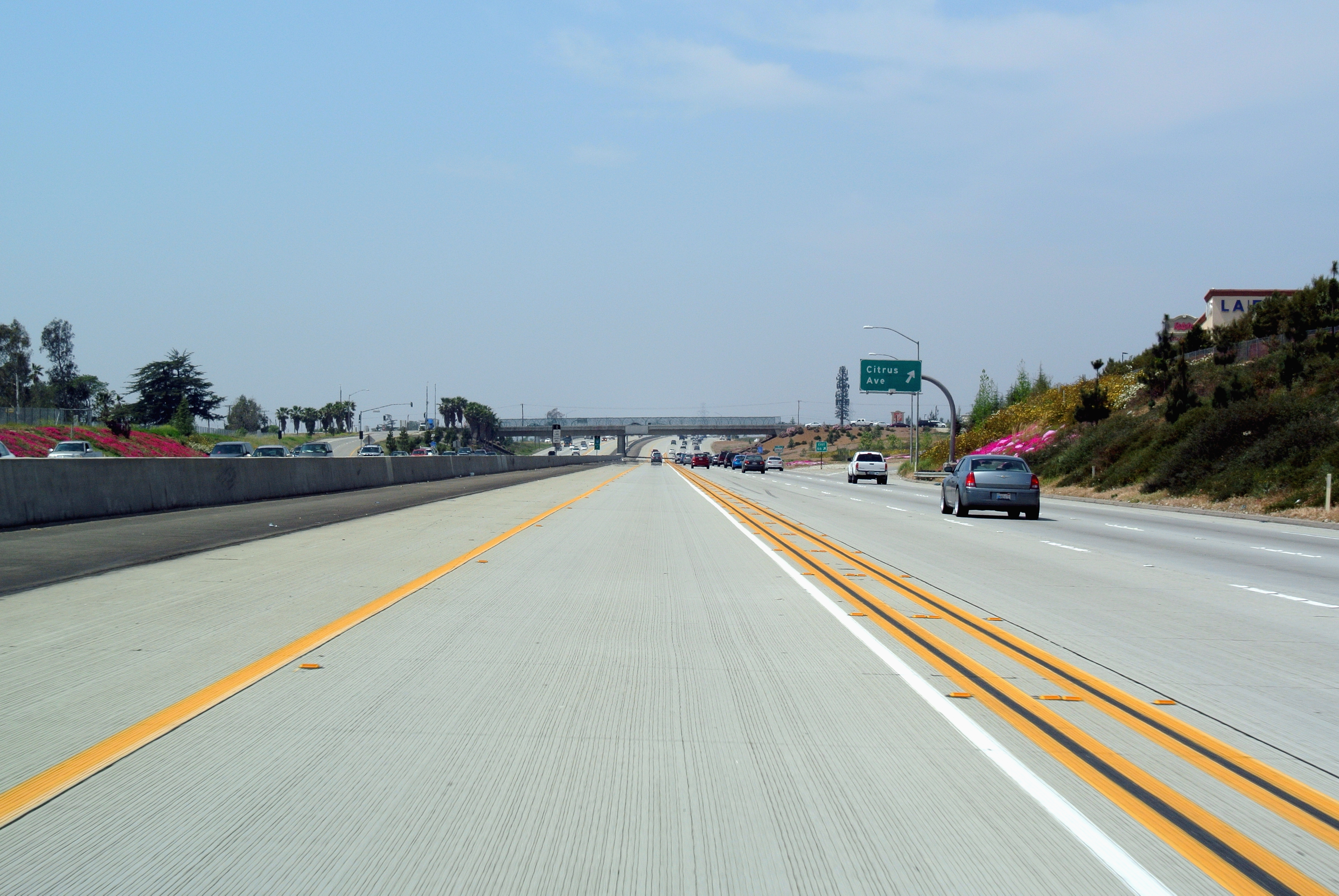
Foothill Freeway near the Citrus Avenue off-ramp

The Metrolink rail service to the greater Los Angeles area has a station that runs through the center of town, connecting to downtown Los Angeles and San Bernardino. The city of Fontana is ten minutes away from Ontario International Airport.

The city is served by Omnitrans bus service. and VVTA.

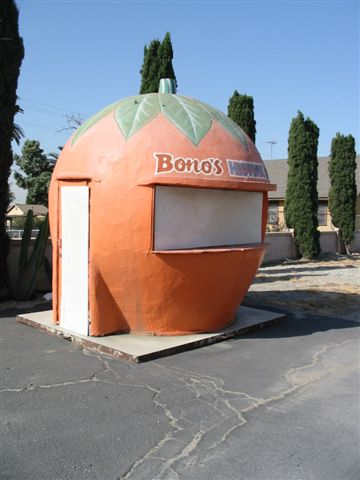
Bono's Orange on Route 66 is one of the last extant giant orange-shaped fruit stands once common to the region. This stand was built in 1936 and moved to its present location in 1997.

- San Bernardino Freeway
- Ontario Freeway
- Foothill Boulevard (Historic U.S. Route 66)
- Valley Boulevard (Historic U.S. Route 99)
- Foothill Freeway

=== Utilities ===
Fontana receives electrical power through Southern California Edison. Gas service is provided by the Southern California Gas Company. Telephone and DSL Internet service are through AT&T and Frontier Communications, though Frontier serves a smaller portion of the city. Charter Communications also provides cable television and cable Internet access. Burrtec Waste provides rubbish and trash collection throughout the city. Burrtec offers both regular waste and green waste recycling programs. Fontana is served by five different water companies, but none of their service areas overlap. These companies are: Fontana Water; the Cucamonga Valley Water District; Marygold Mutual Water; and West Valley Water District, and the city of Rialto. Sewage service in the city is provided by the Inland Empire Utilities Agency, but is billed out by the city of Fontana itself. The Fontana community is serviced by KFON-TV (commonly known as Fontana Community Television), a Government-access television (GATV) station.

=== Healthcare ===
Fontana is home to the Kaiser Permanente-Fontana Hospital. Located on Sierra Avenue, and occupying most of the block between Sierra, Marygold, and Palmetto Avenues, and Valley Boulevard, The campus is one of the largest healthcare facilities in the Inland Empire Region. The various facilities are also among the tallest and largest buildings in the city (other than industrial distribution centers). The hospital is home to 60 different specialized departments, plus emergency care.

Located in the north end of the city, along the "Miracle Mile" of Sierra Lakes Parkway and the 210 freeway, is the Sierra San Antonio Medical Plaza, a 60,000-square-foot (5,600 m^{2}) outpatient center and medical office building supported by San Antonio Community Hospital. Services currently available from SSAMP are urgent care, diagnostic radiology, physician offices, and a pharmacy. The facility also includes a 3,000-square-foot (280 m^{2}) educational suite where community lectures, health screenings, awareness campaigns, maternity and CPR classes are held.

=== Law enforcement ===
The Fontana Police Department employs 207 sworn officers, as well as civilian personnel. The department was established in October 1952.

In 2013, there was a 60% gap between the minority share of the city's population (85.6%) and that of the Fontana Police Department (25.6%), the largest gap of any city in the US with a population greater than 100,000.

In 2016, two members of the Fontana Police Department, David J. Moore Sr. and Andrew Anderson, filed a lawsuit, alleging racial discrimination by the Fontana Police Department. Among other allegations, the lawsuit alleged that in 1994 Fontana Police tampered with the corpse of Black murder victim Jimmy Earl Burleson by planting a piece of chicken in the decedent's hand, photographing the victim in this pose, and circulating the photo among the Fontana Police Department for a number of years; the photo in question was later published in the San Bernardino County Sentinel in 2017. The lawsuit was settled in 2024.

In August 2018, Fontana police coerced a false confession from a man named Thomas Perez Jr. for the murder of his father, after Perez had reported his father missing. Fontana police officers interrogated Perez for 17 hours, falsely claiming that his father had been found dead with stab marks and "wore a toe tag at the morgue," and that they would have Perez's pet dog euthanized as a result of his actions. After Perez falsely confessed, he was left alone in the interrogation room, where he was captured on video trying to hang himself. Perez's missing father was confirmed to be alive the same day. In May 2024, Fontana agreed to settle a lawsuit by Perez against the city for $898,000.

== Notable people ==
- Dion Acoff, soccer player
- Pete Aguilar, mayor of Redlands and U.S. representative for California
- Hit-Boy, music producer, recording artist
- Travis Barker, musician
- Tyler Chatwood, pitcher for Colorado Rockies of Major League Baseball
- Jesse Chavez, MLB player for the Los Angeles Angels
- Chukwudi Chijindu, soccer player
- Greg Colbrunn, former MLB player, World Series champion
- Jermaine Curtis, MLB player
- Jayden Daniels, American professional football quarterback for the Washington Commanders
- Mike Davis, author and commentator
- Joseph Dippolito, Italian American mafia member
- Adam Driver, actor
- Maurice Edu, soccer player who represented the United States national team, 2008 Olympian, and television sportscaster
- Bill Fagerbakke, television and voice actor, SpongeBob SquarePants
- Sammy Hagar, rock musician (guitarist and vocalist), former member of Montrose and Van Halen
- Alan Harper, pro football player
- Marvin Jones, NFL wide receiver, Cincinnati Bengals
- Sharon Jordan, film and television actress, The Suite Life of Zack & Cody
- Scott Karl, MLB player for Milwaukee Brewers, Colorado Rockies, and Anaheim Angels
- Sam Khalifa, former MLB player
- Bobby Kielty, former MLB player for Oakland Athletics and Boston Red Sox
- Jeff Liefer, former MLB player for Chicago White Sox
- Whitman Mayo, actor (Sanford and Son), lived in Fontana and was once Grand Marshal of the Fontana Days Parade
- Troy Percival, former relief pitcher for 2002 World Series champion Anaheim Angels and Tampa Bay Rays
- Michael Pitre, running back coach for the Atlanta Falcons
- Melissa Ricks, Filipino-American actress, dancer, model and TV host, Star Circle Quest contestant and alumna
- Leo Romero, professional skateboarder
- Sean Rooks, NBA basketball player (retired)
- Brett Rossi, glamour model, entertainer, exotic dancer and pornographic film actress
- Molly Santana, rapper
- Alexis Serna, placekicker for Winnipeg Blue Bombers (CFL)
- Rosearik Rikki Simons, voice actor
- Jimmy Smith, cornerback for Baltimore Ravens
- Chris Stewart, MLB catcher for Pittsburgh Pirates and New York Yankees
- Eric Weddle, NFL defensive back
- Evan Wick, wrestler
- Jamaal Williams, NFL running back for New Orleans Saints
- Marc Wilmore (1963–2021), American television writer, producer, actor, and comedian
- Charlyne Yi, actress and comedian
- Mia Yim, pro wrestler

== In popular culture ==
The Hells Angels Motorcycle Club was founded in Fontana, in 1948. The founding charter is known as the Berdoo Charter, in reference to the slang name for San Bernardino.

Fontana was featured in the pilot of the television show High Potential. Residents criticized the show's negative portrayal of the city.

In 2022, Mayor Acquanetta Warren was featured in an episode of the television show Undercover Boss.

== See also ==
- U.S. Rabbit Experimental Station California Historical Landmark in Fontana.
- San Bernardino County Sheriff's Department
- List of U.S. cities with large Hispanic populations
